= Chittagong =

Second-largest city in Bangladesh

Chittagong চট্টগ্রাম/চাটগাঁও (Bengali) চিটাং (Chittagonian)
- Metropolis
- Chattogram
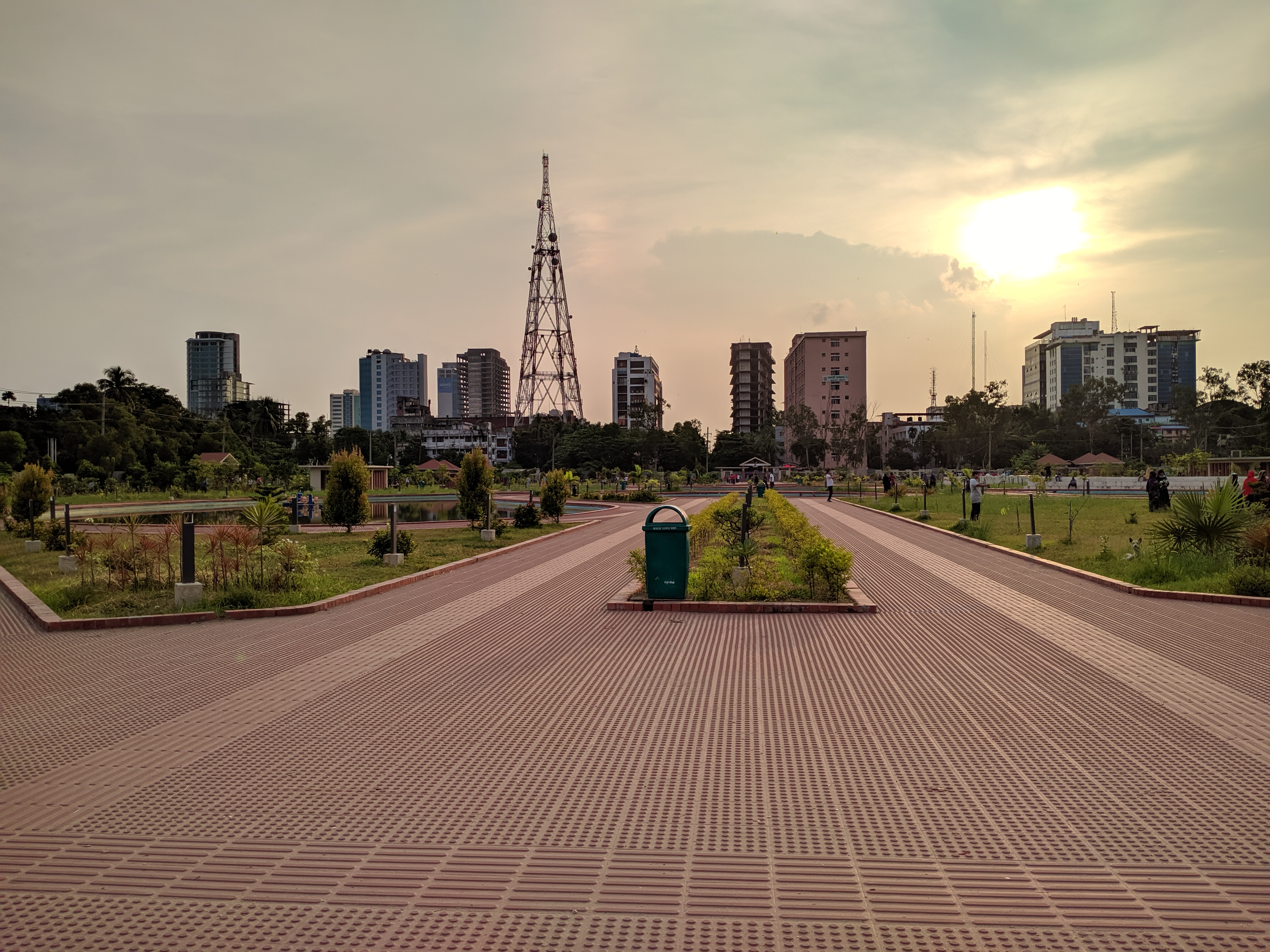
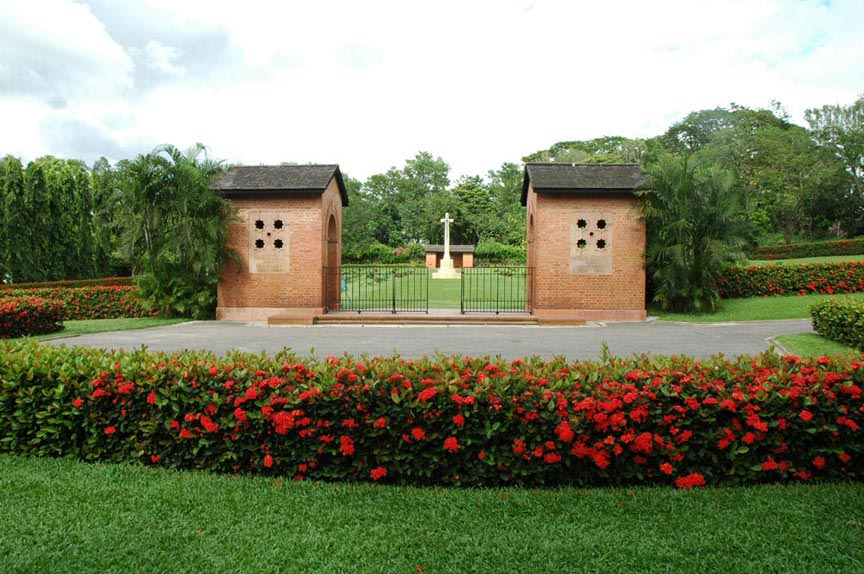
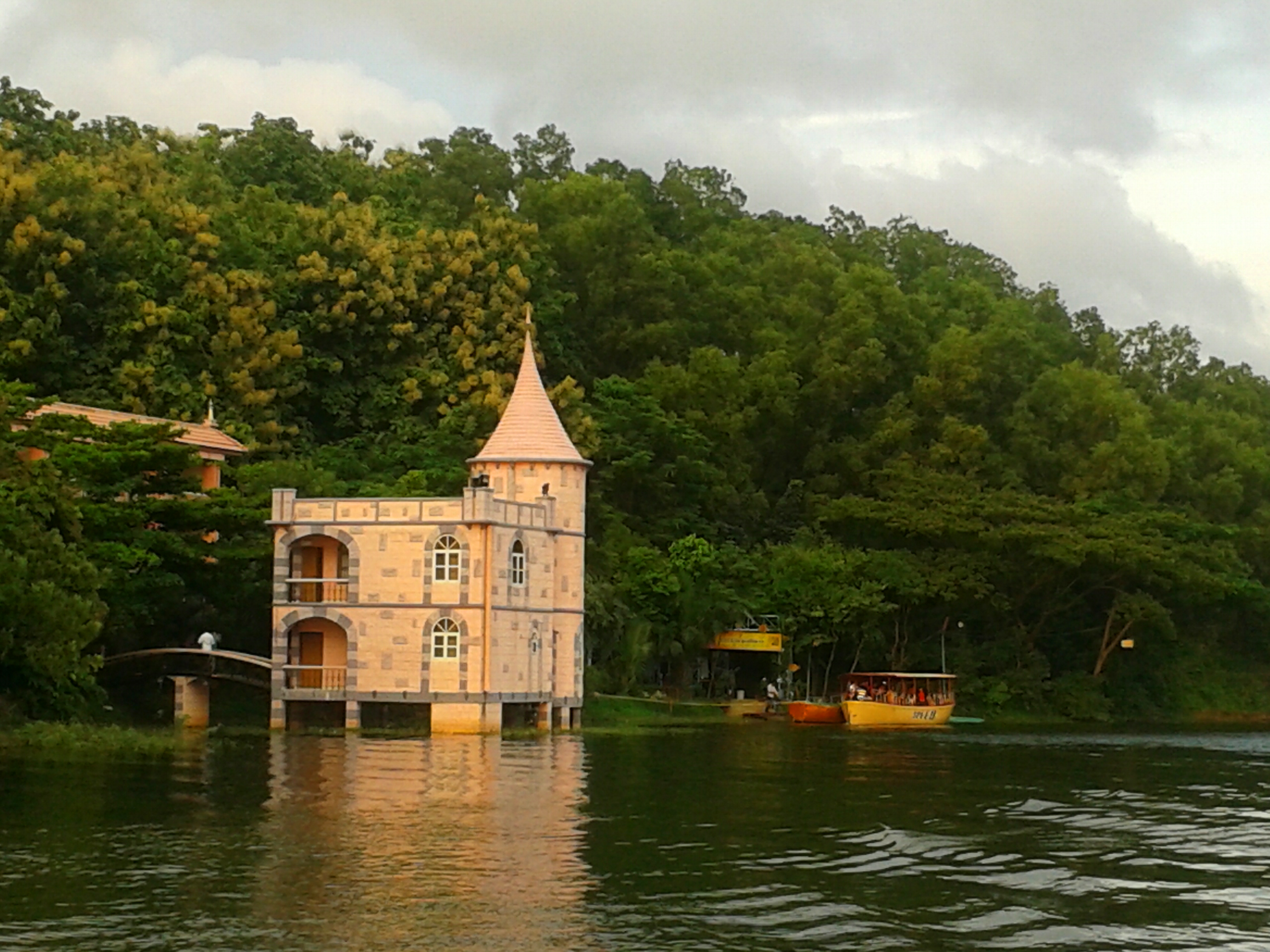
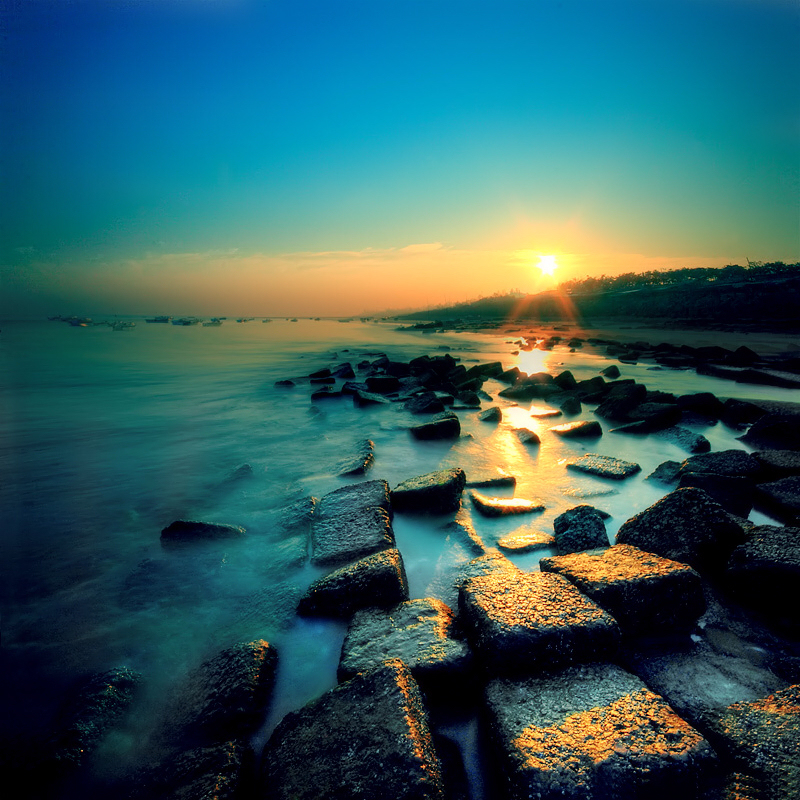
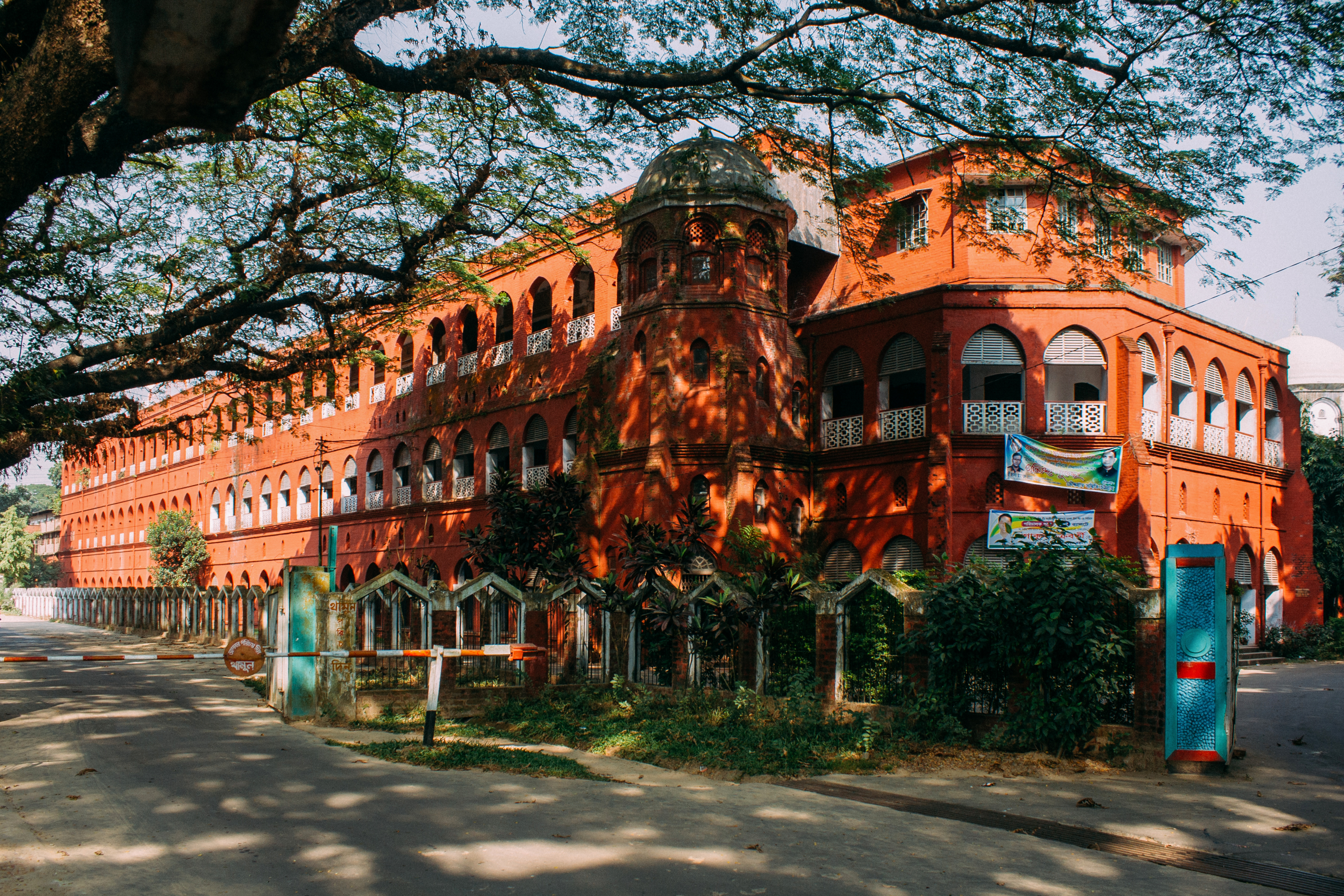
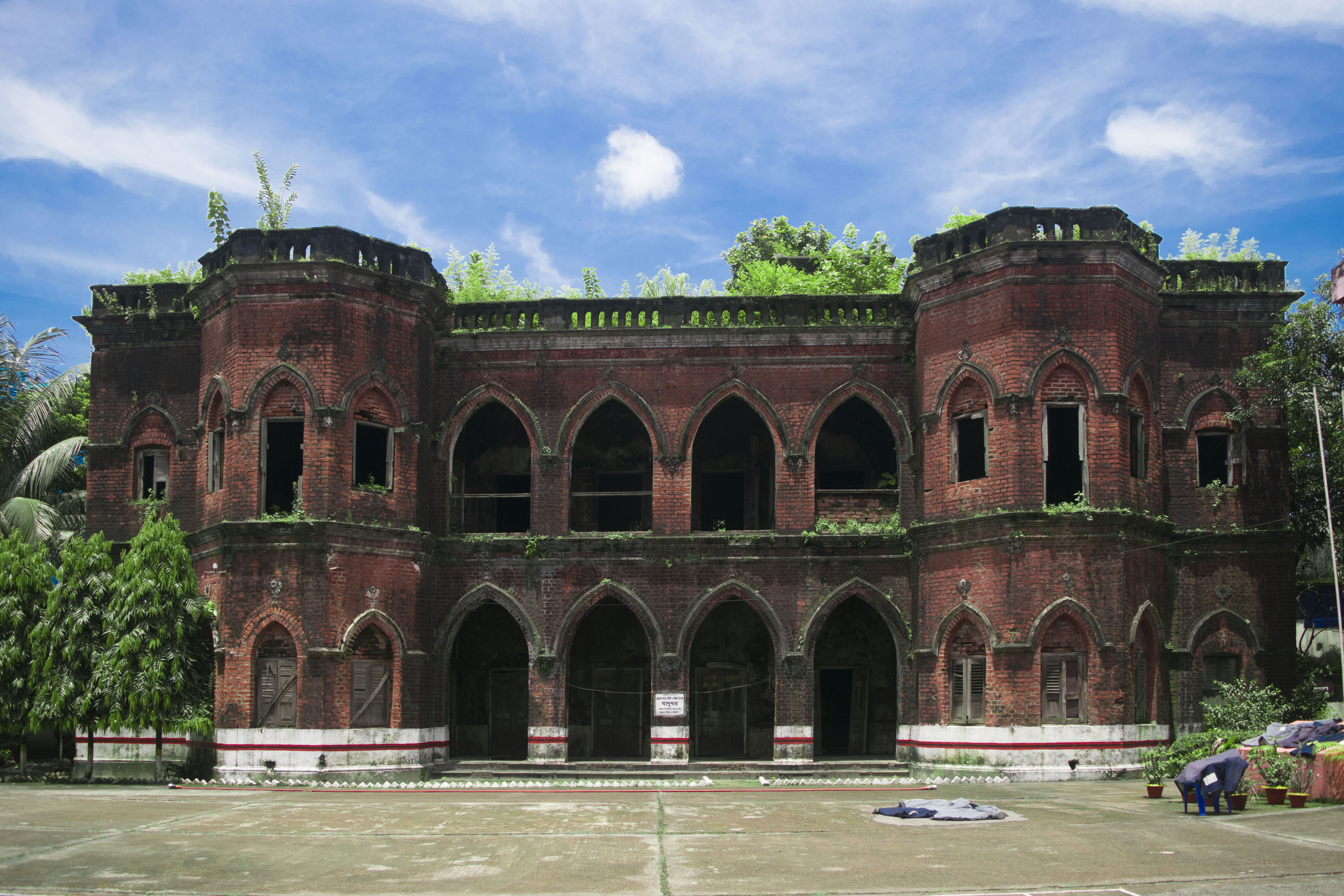
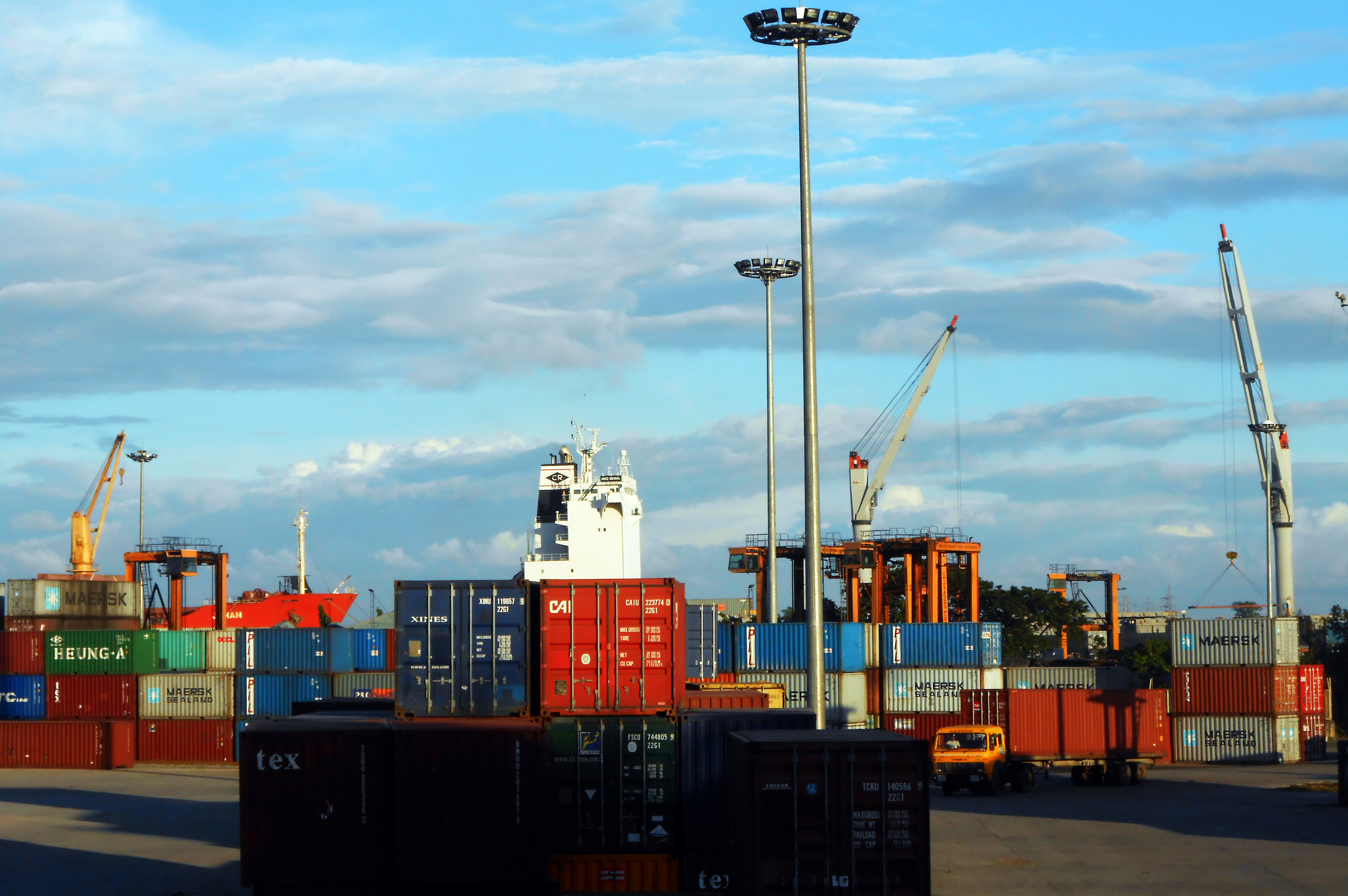
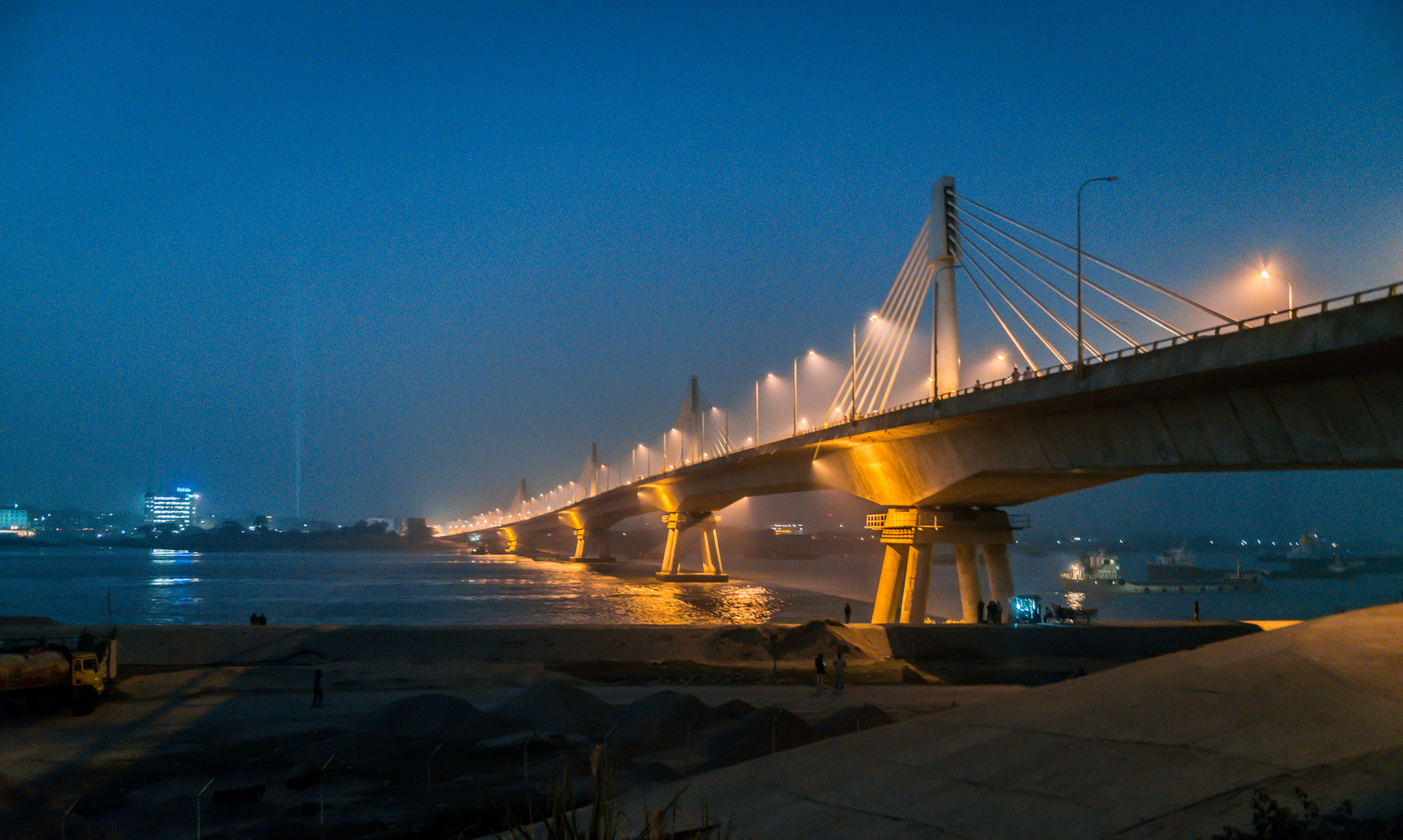
- Agrabad Commercial area skyline as seen from Jamburi Park Chittagong War Cemetery Foy's Lake Patenga Central Railway Building Chandanpura Nachghar Port of Chittagong Shah Amanat Bridge over the Karnaphuli River
- Nicknames: Port City; Commercial Capital of Bangladesh; Land of twelve Sufi saints
- Interactive map of Chittagong
- Location within Chittagong division Location within Bangladesh Location within South Asia Location within Asia
- Coordinates: 22°20′06″N 91°49′57″E
- Country: Bangladesh
- Division: Chittagong
- District: Chittagong
- Establishment: Before 4th century BCE (Port of Chittagong)
- Granted city status: 1863; 163 years ago

Government
  - Type: Mayor–Council
  - Body: Chattogram City Corporation
  - Mayor: Shahadat Hossain (BNP)
  - City Council: 41 constituencies
  - Parliament: 6 constituencies

Area
  - Metropolis: 168.07 km^{2} (64.89 sq mi)
  - Urban: 302.11 km^{2} (116.65 sq mi)
  - Metro: 615.37 km^{2} (237.60 sq mi)
- Elevation: 29 m (95 ft)

Population (2022)
  - Metropolis: 3,230,507
  - Urban: 5,253,312
  - Urban density: 17,389/km^{2} (45,037/sq mi)
  - Metro: 5,653,000
  - Metro density: 9,186/km^{2} (23,790/sq mi)
  - City rank: 2nd in Bangladesh
  - Metro rank: 2nd in Bangladesh; 3rd in Bengal Region;
- Demonym: Chittagonian

Languages
  - Official: Bengali • English
  - Regional: Chittagonian
- Time zone: UTC+6 (BST)
- Postal code: 4000, 4100, 42xx
- Calling code: +880 31
- Vehicle registration: CHATTO METRO -X-XX-XXXX or CHATTOGRAM -X-XX-XXXX
- UN/LOCODE: BD CGP
- GDP (2026): Nominal ▲$61.3 billion
- HDI (2023): 0.695 medium · 8th of 22
- Police: Chattogram Metropolitan Police
- International Airport: Shah Amanat International Airport
- Metropolitan Planning Authority: Chattogram Development Authority
- Water Supply and Sewerage Authority: Chattogram WASA
- Website: ccc.gov.bd

Chittagong (/ˈtʃɪtəɡɒŋ/ CHIT-ə-gong), officially Chattogram, (Note: Bengali: চট্টগ্রাম, romanized: Côṭṭôgrām, IPA: [ˈt͡ʃɔʈːoɡram] Traditionally in Bengali: চাটগাঁও, romanized: Cāṭgã̄o, and in Chittagonian: চিটাং, romanized: Sitāṅ) is the capital and largest city of the Chittagong Division and Chittagong District. It is the second-largest city in Bangladesh after the capital, Dhaka, and the largest city in the Greater Chittagong region, with a land area of 157 square kilometers. Home to the Port of Chittagong, it is the busiest port in Bangladesh and the Bay of Bengal. The city is also the business capital of Bangladesh. The city is located on the banks of the Karnaphuli River between the Chittagong Hill Tracts and the Bay of Bengal. In 2022, the Chittagong District had a population of approximately 9.2 million according to a census conducted by the government of Bangladesh. In 2022, the city area had a population of more than 5.6 million. The city is an important export hub, with goods such as tea, jute, and petroleum products being shipped through its port. The city is home to many large local businesses and plays an important role in the Bangladeshi economy.

One of the world's oldest ports with a functional natural harbor for centuries, Chittagong appeared on ancient Greek and Roman maps, including on Ptolemy's world map. It was located on the southern branch of the Silk Road. In the 9th century, merchants from the Abbasid Caliphate established a trading post in Chittagong. The port fell to the Muslim conquest of Bengal during the 14th century. It was the site of a royal mint under the Delhi Sultanate, Bengal Sultanate and Mughal Empire. Between the 15th and 17th centuries, Chittagong was also a centre of administrative, literary, commercial and maritime activities in Arakan, a narrow strip of land along the eastern coast of the Bay of Bengal which was under strong Bengali influence for 350 years. During the 16th century, the port became a Portuguese trading post and João de Barros described it as "the most famous and wealthy city of the Kingdom of Bengal". The Mughal Empire expelled the Portuguese and Arakanese in 1666.

The Nawab of Bengal ceded the port to the British East India Company in 1793. The Port of Chittagong was re-organized in 1887 and its busiest shipping links were with British Burma. In 1928, Chittagong was declared a "Major Port" of British India. During World War II, Chittagong was a base for Allied Forces engaged in the Burma Campaign. The port city began to expand and industrialize during the 1940s, particularly after the Partition of British India. The city was the historic terminus of the Assam Bengal Railway and Pakistan Eastern Railway. During the Bangladesh Liberation War in 1971, Chittagong was the site of the Bangladeshi declaration of independence. The port city has benefited from the growth of heavy industry, logistics, and manufacturing in Bangladesh. Trade unionism was strong during the 1990s.

Chittagong accounts for 12% of Bangladesh's GDP, including 40% of industrial output, 80% of international trade, and 50% of tax revenue. The port city is home to many of the oldest and largest companies in the country. The Port of Chittagong is one of the busiest ports in South Asia. The largest base of the Bangladesh Navy is located in Chittagong, along with an air base of the Bangladesh Air Force, garrisons of the Bangladesh Army and the main base of the Bangladesh Coast Guard. The eastern zone of the Bangladesh Railway is based in Chittagong. The Chittagong Stock Exchange is one of the twin stock markets of Bangladesh with over 700 listed companies. The Chittagong Tea Auction is a commodity exchange dealing with Bangladeshi tea. The CEPZ and KEPZ are key industrial zones with foreign direct investments. The city is served by Shah Amanat International Airport for domestic and external flights. Karnaphuli Tunnel, the first and only underwater road tunnel of South Asia, is located in Chittagong. The city is the hometown of prominent economists, Nobel laureate Muhammad Yunus, scientists, freedom fighters and entrepreneurs. Chittagong has a high degree of religious and ethnic diversity among Bangladeshi cities, despite having a great Muslim majority. Minorities include Hindus, Christians, Chakmas, Marmas, Baruas, Tripuris, Garos and others.

== Etymology ==
Chittagong as Islamabad in a British map in 1776. After the Mughal conquest in 1666, the city was named Islamabad (lit. 'abode of Islam') by Emperor Aurangzeb.

The etymology of Chittagong is uncertain. The port city has been known by various names in history, including Chatigaon, Chatigam, Chattagrama, Islamabad, Chattala, Chaityabhumi and Porto Grande De Bengala.

The Bengali word for Chittagong, Chattogram (চট্টগ্রাম), has the suffix "-gram" (গ্রাম), meaning "village" in Standard Bengali. The earliest records, before Islam reached the region, state that it was a place of chaitya or Buddhist monasteries. The city had a very large Buddhist population before Islam. The city was renamed Islamabad (City of Islam) during the Mughal era. The name continues to be used in the old city. In April 2018, the Cabinet Division of the Government of Bangladesh decided to change the city's name to Chattogram, based on its Bengali spelling and pronunciation; the move was criticized in the Bangladeshi media.

One explanation credits the first Arab traders for Shatt Al Ghangh (Arabic: شط الغنغ) where shatt means "Delta" and ghangh stood for the Ganges, from that term Chattala evolved. The Arakanese chronicle that a king named Tsu-la-taing Tsandaya (Sula Taing Chandra), after conquering Bengal, set up a stone pillar as a trophy/memorial at the place since called Tst-ta-gaung as the limit of conquest.

== History ==
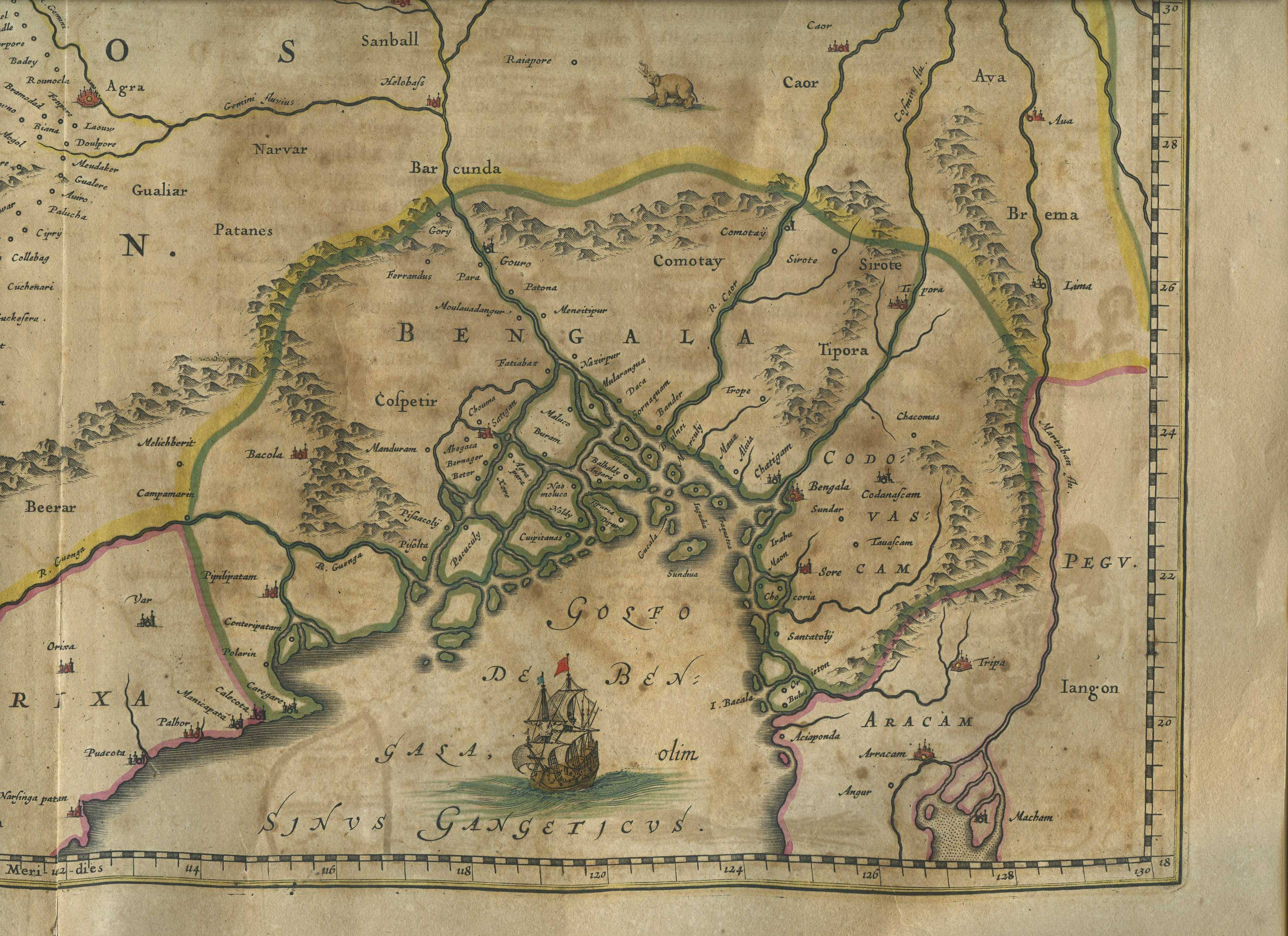
A Dutch map in 1638 showing Bengal, Chittagong and Arakan

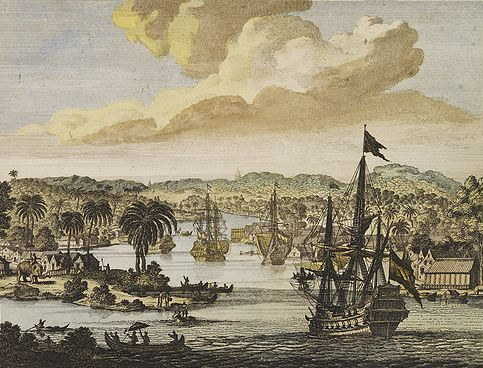
Dutch VOC ships in Chittagong, 1702

Stone Age fossils and tools unearthed in the region indicate that Chittagong has been inhabited since Neolithic times. It is an ancient port city, with a recorded history dating back to the 4th century BC. Its harbour was mentioned in Ptolemy's world map in the 2nd century as one of the most impressive ports in the East. The region was part of the ancient Bengali Samatata and Harikela kingdoms. The Chandra dynasty once dominated the area and was followed by the Varman dynasty and Deva dynasty.

Chinese traveller Xuanzang described the area as "a sleeping beauty rising from mist and water" in the 7th century.

Many Sufi missionaries settled in Chittagong and played an instrumental role in the spread of Islam.

Sultan Fakhruddin Mubarak Shah of Sonargaon conquered Chittagong in 1340, making it a part of Sultanate of Bengal. It was the principal maritime gateway to the kingdom, which was reputed as one of the wealthiest states in the Indian subcontinent. Medieval Chittagong was a hub for maritime trade of ancient Bengalis with China, Sumatra, the Maldives, Sri Lanka, the Middle East, and East Africa. It was notable for its medieval trades in pearls, silk, muslin, rice, bullion, horses, and gunpowder. The port was also a major shipbuilding hub.

Ibn Battuta visited the port city in 1345. Niccolò de' Conti, from Venice, also visited around the same time as Battuta. Chinese admiral Zheng He's treasure fleet anchored in Chittagong during imperial missions to the Sultanate of Bengal.

Dhaniya Manikya conquered Chittagong in 1513. Hossain Shah sent his noble commander Gorai Mallik to attack Tripura. Gorai Mallik recaptured the territories lost. But the following year Dhaniya Manikya again conquered Chittagong. In 1516, Husain Shah decided to conquer Chittagong again. Husain assigned the charge of the land army for conquest of Chittagong to his general Paragal Khan; prince Nasrat, who was made crown prince of Bengal in 1515, was placed in overall command. On Nasrat's order, Paragal Khan advanced from his base on the Feni River. The territory up to the western bank of Kaladan river was placed under his governorship's administration. The hostilities probably ended in 1516, when Mrauk U recognized Bengali sovereignty over Chittagong and northern Arakan. As a result of the conflict, Mrauk U again became a vassal of the Bengal Sultanate. Nasrat renamed Chittagong to Fatehabad, City of Victory. A locality of Chittagong named Nasirabad is named after him. Bengal Sultanate's conquest of Chittagong is also corroborated by Portuguese adventurer Joao de Silvera who, landing in Chittagong in 1517, stated that Chittagong was a part of Bengal Sultanate.

The Arakanese ruled over Chittagong spanned from the late 16th century to 1666, marking a significant yet turbulent era in the region's history. The Kingdom of Mrauk U, centered on the west coast of present-day Myanmar, expanded into south-eastern Bengal, with Chittagong becoming a strategic part of its domain. The Arakanese maintained their power through alliances with the Portuguese, who were instrumental in fortifying their control. Chittagong evolved into a centre of trade and piracy during this time, with Portuguese and Arakanese forces frequently raiding Mughal territories. The blending of Bengali, Buddhist, and Portuguese influences made the region a unique cultural and administrative frontier.

The decline of Arakanese rule was triggered by political conflicts, including their involvement in the Mughal succession struggle. The assassination of Mughal prince Shah Shuja in Arakan strained relations with the Mughal Empire, prompting a decisive campaign led by Subahdar Shaista Khan in 1666. The Mughals recaptured Chittagong, ending 70 years circa of Arakanese presence. This period left a lasting legacy on the region, highlighting the interplay of trade, politics, and cultural exchange between Bengal and Arakan.

Chittagong featured prominently in the military history of the Bengal Sultanate, including during the Reconquest of Arakan and the Bengal Sultanate–Kingdom of Mrauk U War of 1512–1516.

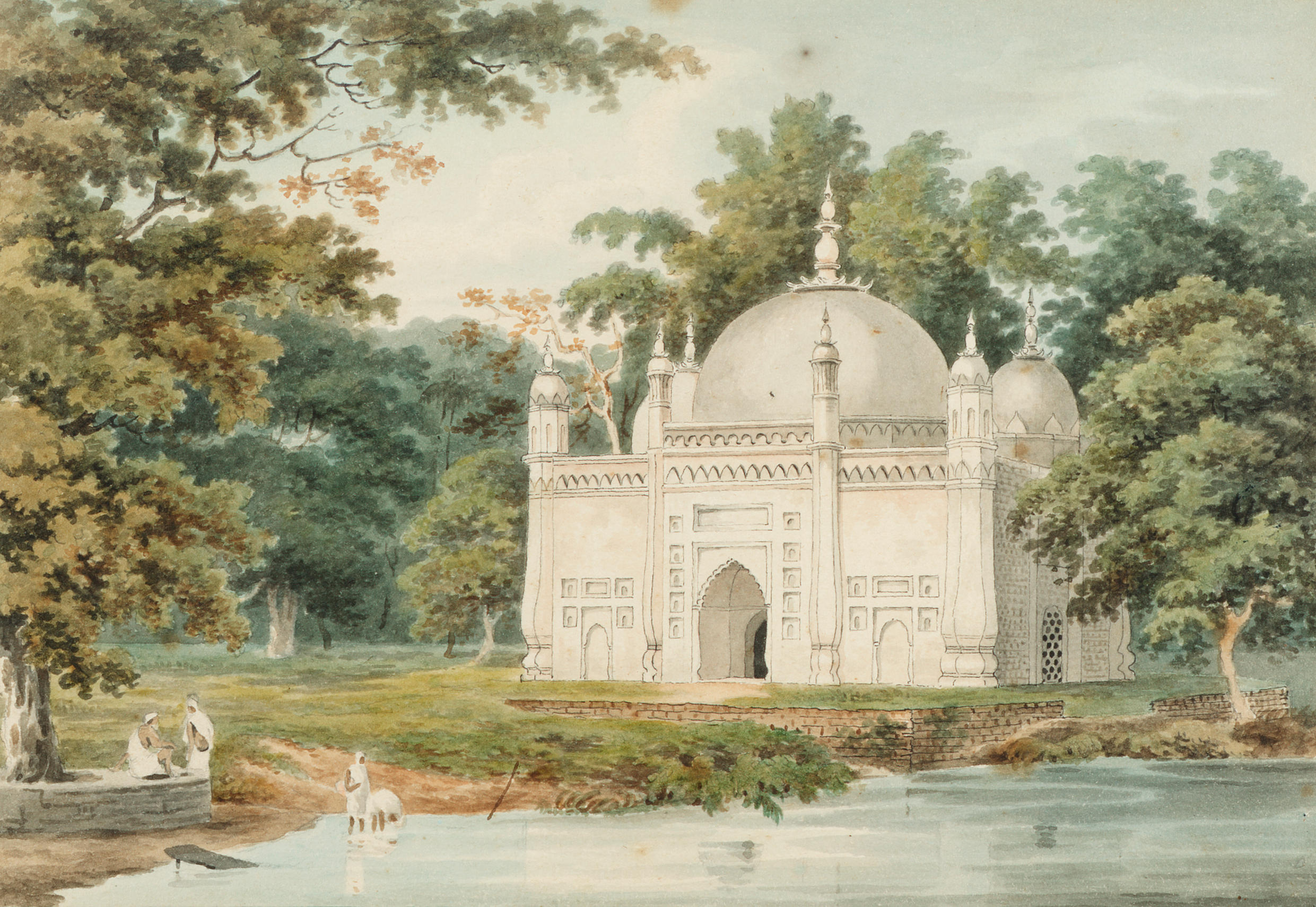
Painting of Chittagong in 1822

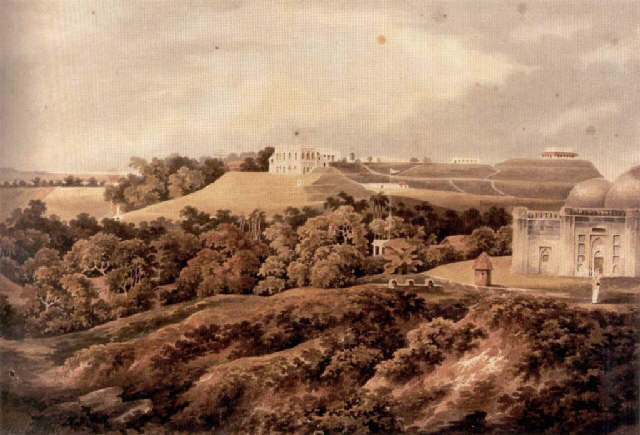
Hilltop mansions and bungalows historically dominated Chittagong's skyline

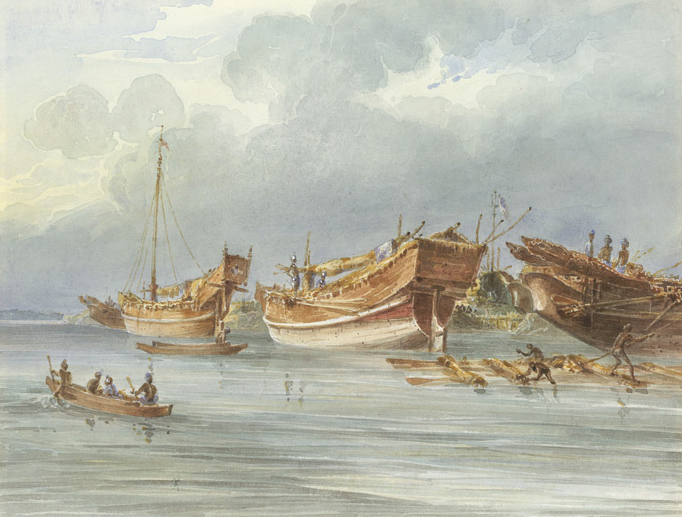
Ships from Chittagong along the coast of Bengal and Arakan in the northeast Bay of Bengal. Traders from Chittagong played an important role in Arakan and British Burma.

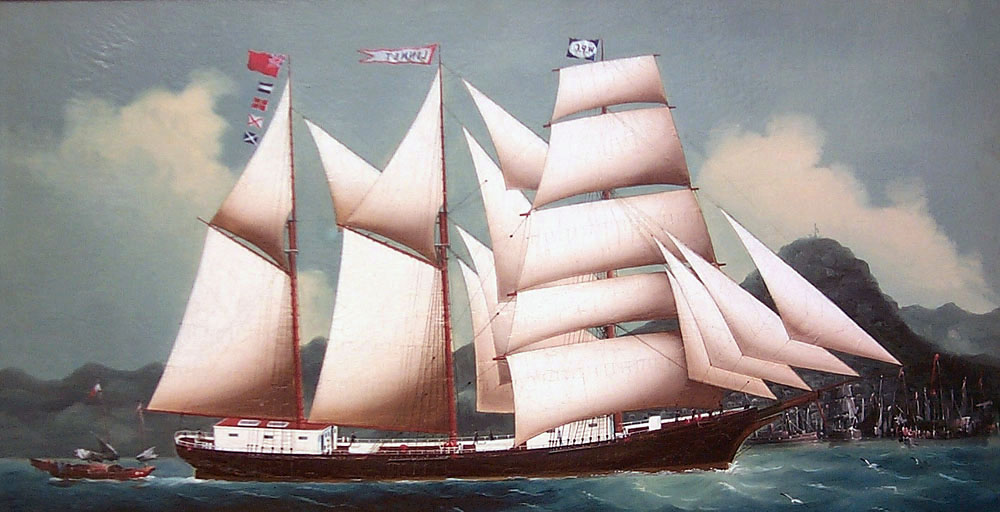
A ship built in Chittagong near the coast of Hong Kong in 1890

During the 13th and 16th centuries, Arabs and Persians heavily colonized the port city of Chittagong, initially arriving for trade and to spread Islam. Most Arab settlers arrived from the trade route between Iraq and Chittagong and were perhaps the prime reason for the spread of Islam to Bangladesh. The first Persian settlers also arrived for trade and religious purposes, with the possible goal of Persianisation as well. Persians and other Iranic peoples have deeply affected the history of the Bengal Sultanate, with Persian being one of the main languages of the Muslim state, as well as also influencing the Bengali language and writing scripts.

Two decades after Vasco Da Gama's landing in Calicut, the Bengal Sultanate permitted the Portuguese settlement in Chittagong to be established in 1528. It became the first European colonial enclave in Bengal. The Bengal Sultanate lost control of Chittagong in 1531 after Arakan declared independence and the established Kingdom of Mrauk U. This altered geopolitical landscape allowed the Portuguese unhindered control of Chittagong for over a century.

Portuguese ships from Goa and Malacca began frequenting the port city in the 16th century. The cartaz system was introduced and required all ships in the area to purchase naval trading licenses from the Portuguese settlement. Slave trade and piracy flourished. The nearby island of Sandwip was conquered in 1602. In 1615, the Portuguese Navy defeated a joint Dutch East India Company and Arakanese fleet near the coast of Chittagong.

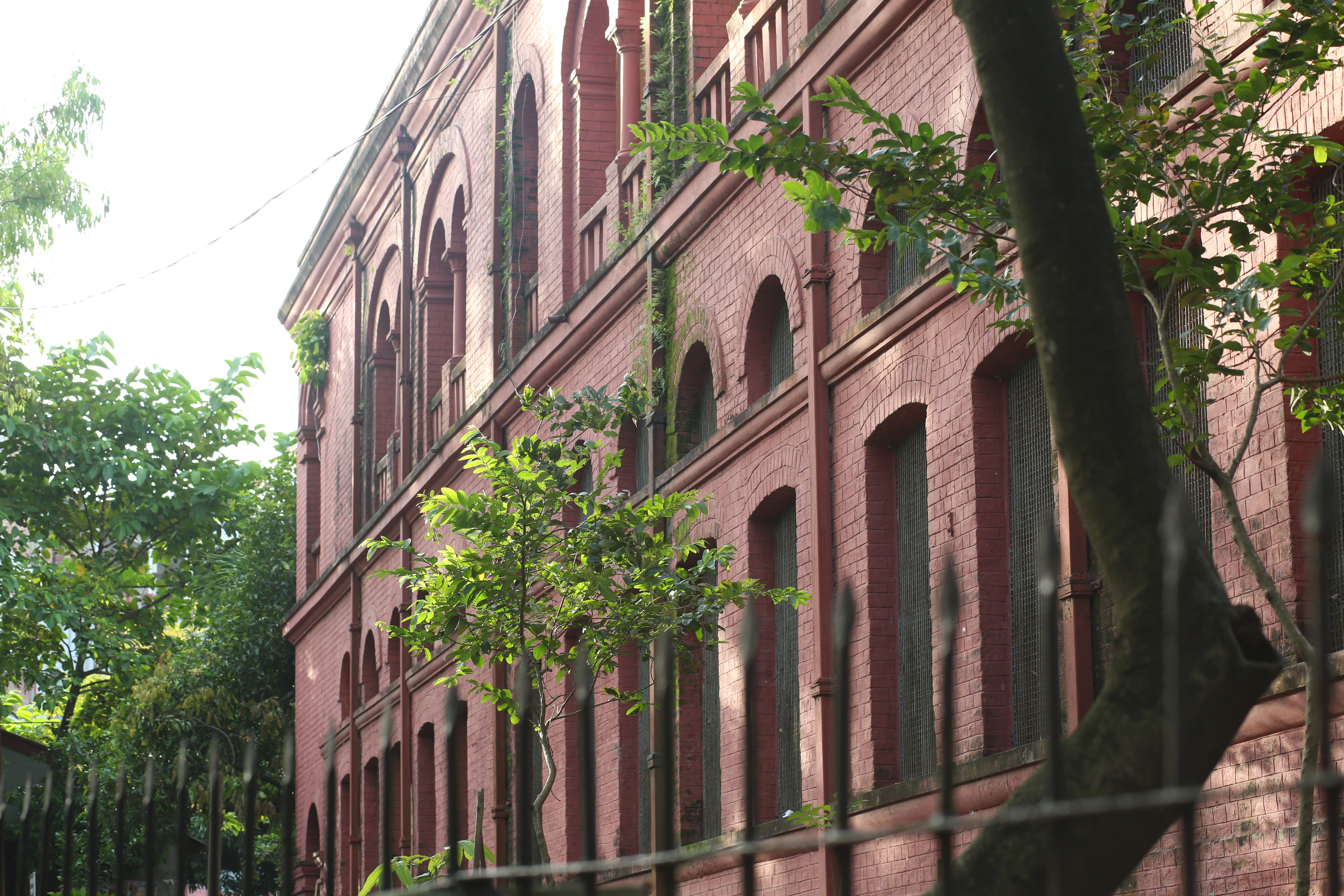
Colonial architecture in Chittagong

In 1666, the Mughal government of Bengal led by viceroy Shaista Khan moved to retake Chittagong from Portuguese and Arakanese control by launching the Mughal conquest of Chittagong. The Mughals attacked the Arakanese from the jungle with a 6,500-strong army, which was further supported by 288 Mughal naval ships blockading the Chittagong harbor. After three days of battle, the Arakanese surrendered. The Mughals expelled the Portuguese from Chittagong. Mughal rule ushered a new era in the history of Chittagong territory to the southern bank of Kashyapnadi (Kaladan River). The port city was renamed Islamabad. The Grand Trunk Road connected it with North India and Central Asia. Economic growth increased due to an efficient system of land grants for clearing hinterlands for cultivation. The Mughals also contributed to the architecture of the area, including the building of Fort Ander and many mosques. Chittagong was integrated into the prosperous Bengali economy, which also included Orissa and Bihar. Shipbuilding increased dramatically under the Mughal rule, and the Ottoman Sultans had many Ottoman warships built in Chittagong during this period.

In 1685, the British East India Company sent out an expedition under Admiral Nicholson with the instructions to seize and fortify Chittagong on behalf of the English; however, the expedition proved abortive. Two years later, the company's Court of Directors decided to make Chittagong the headquarters of their Bengal trade and sent out a fleet of ten or eleven ships to seize it under Captain Heath. However, after reaching Chittagong in early 1689, the fleet found the city too strongly held and abandoned their attempt at capturing it. The city was possessed by the Nawab of Bengal until 1793 when East India Company took complete control of the former Mughal province of Bengal.

The First Anglo-Burmese War in 1823 threatened the British hold on Chittagong. There were several rebellions against British rule, notably during the Indian rebellion of 1857, when the 2nd, 3rd, and 4th companies of the 34th Bengal Infantry Regiment revolted and released all prisoners from the city's jail. In a backlash, the rebels were suppressed by the Sylhet Light Infantry.

Arakan was annexed in 1826 and incorporated into the Bengal Presidency. Agriculturalists from Chittagong played a key role in the development of the rice economy in Arakan. The economy of northern Arakan was integrated with the Chittagong economy. During this period, Arakan Division became one of the top rice exporters in the world. Bengalis from Chittagong were vital to the success of Arakan's rice industry.

Railways were introduced in 1865, beginning with the Eastern Bengal Railway connecting Chittagong to Dacca and Calcutta. Chittagong became the main gateway to Eastern Bengal and Assam. In the 1890s, Chittagong became the terminus of Assam Bengal Railway. The hinterland of Chittagong Port covered the tea and jute producing regions of Assam and Bengal, as well as Assam's oil industry. Chittagong was also linked to the crucial oil and gas industry in Burma. Chittagong was a major center of trade with British Burma. It hosted many prominent companies of the British Empire.

The Chittagong armoury raid by Bengali revolutionaries in 1930 was a major event in British India's anti-colonial history.

=== World War II ===
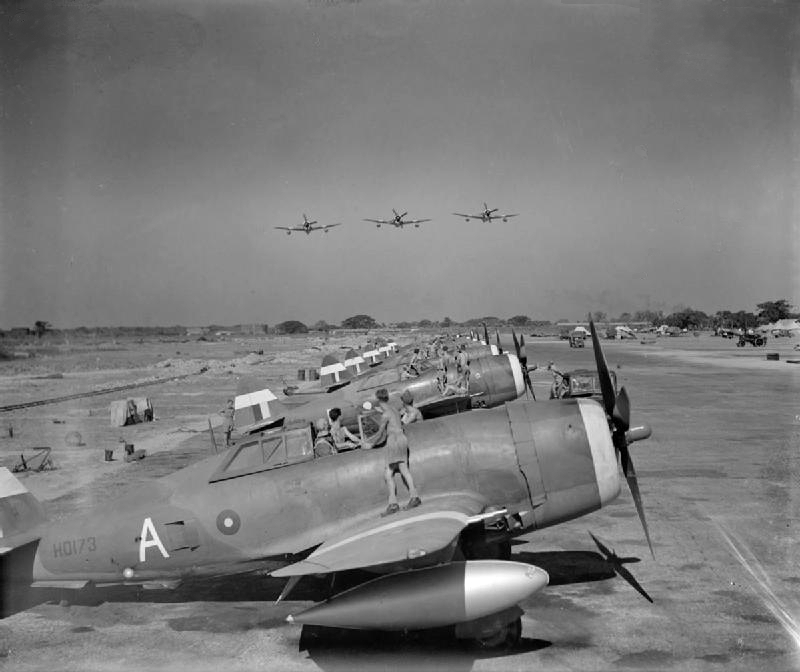
Royal Air Force Thunderbolts lined up at Chittagong in 1944

During World War II, Chittagong became a frontline city in the Southeast Asian Theater. It was a critical air, naval and military base for Allied Forces during the Burma Campaign against Japan. The Imperial Japanese Army Air Force carried out air raids on Chittagong in April and May 1942, in the run-up to the aborted Japanese invasion of Bengal.

After the Battle of Imphal, the tide turned in favour of the Allied Forces. Units of the United States Army Air Forces' 4th Combat Cargo Group were stationed in Chittagong Airfield in 1945. Commonwealth forces included troops from Britain, India, Australia, and New Zealand. The war had major negative impacts on the city, including the growth of refugees and the Great Famine of 1943. Many wealthy Chittagonians profited from wartime commerce.

715 soldiers are buried at the Chittagong War Cemetery, which is maintained by the Commonwealth War Graves Commission. Allied soldiers constitute the bulk of burials in the cemetery. A few Japanese soldiers are also buried. Remembrance Day services are held each year at the cemetery, with diplomats from Commonwealth countries like the UK, Bangladesh, Australia, India and Pakistan, as well as the United States and Japan, usually in attendance.

=== Modern ===
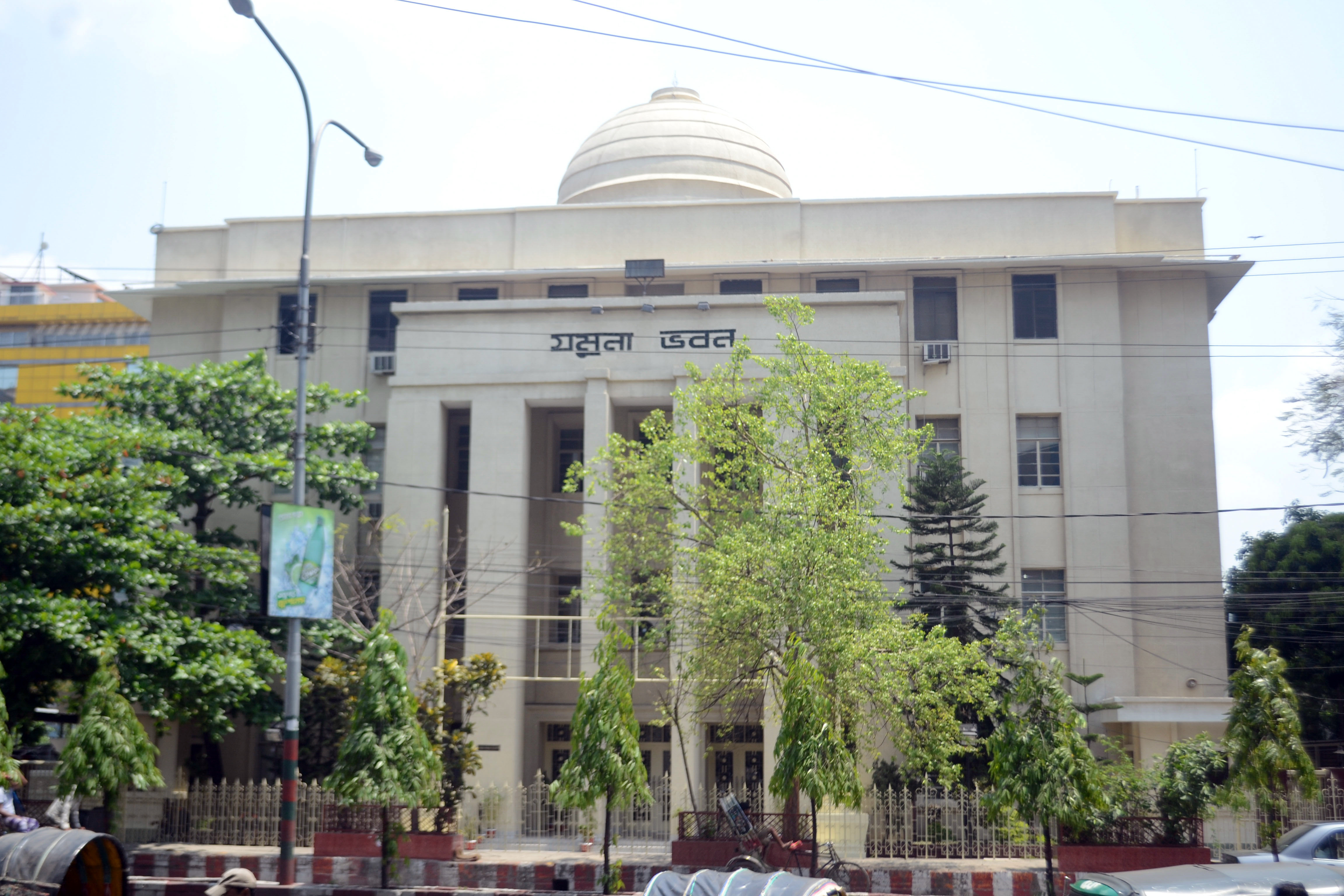
Jamuna Bhaban on Sheikh Mujib Road was home to a chamber of commerce for British businesses.

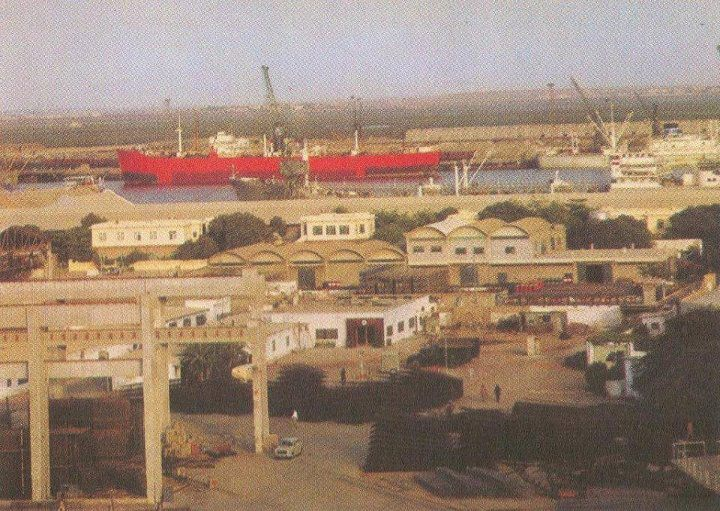
Port of Chittagong in 1960

The Partition of British India in 1947 made Chittagong the chief port of East Pakistan. By March 1948, the Chittagong harbour became a bustling port for international shipping. The Chittagong Tea Auction was set up in 1949. The port city had branches of the Chartered Bank of India, Australia and China, Burmah Oil (known locally as Burmah Eastern), and the James Finlay shipping business. Wealthy Muslim families from British India and British Burma shifted their corporate headquarters to Chittagong. The Ispahani family shifted the head office of M. M. Ispahani Limited from Calcutta to Chittagong. The Ispahanis also relocated the Eastern Federal Insurance Company from Calcutta to Chittagong. The Ispahanis set up the Victory Jute Mills, the Chittagong Jute Manufacturing Company, and the Pahartali Textile Mills. The Africawala brothers set up the first steel re-rolling mills in Chittagong in 1952, which eventually became BSRM. Banks, shipping companies and insurance firms proliferated the city. Many British-owned businesses in East Pakistan were based in Chittagong. Britain's former flag carrier BOAC operated flights to the city. The Agrabad area emerged as the central business district in the 1950s and 1960s, with many corporate offices. The Ispahani Building and Jamuna Bhaban are some of the corporate buildings from this period. The Karnaphuli Paper Mills were built in 1959. The project to build the Eastern Refinery was started in 1963; and was partly funded by the last Shah of Iran. The Agrabad Chamber of Commerce was formed in 1963. It later became the Foreign Investors' Chamber of Commerce and Industry in Bangladesh. The Chittagong Development Authority (CDA) was created by the government to promote urban planning; while wealthy families like the Ispahanis contributed to social welfare by setting up schools and hospitals.

The lawyer and industrialist A K Khan, who set up A K Khan & Company in the aftermath of World War II, represented Chittagong in the federal cabinet of East and West Pakistan. However, East Pakistanis complained of a lack of investment in Chittagong in comparison to Karachi in West Pakistan, even though East Pakistan generated more exports and had a larger population. The Awami League demanded that the country's naval headquarters be shifted from Karachi to Chittagong.

During the Bangladesh Liberation War in 1971, which was waged under the leadership of Sheikh Mujibur Rahman, Chittagong witnessed heavy fighting between rebel Bengali military regiments and the Pakistan Army. It covered Sector 1 in the Mukti Bahini chain of command. Major Ziaur Rahman was the sector commander. The Bangladeshi Declaration of Independence was broadcast from Kalurghat Radio Station and transmitted internationally through foreign ships in Chittagong Port. Ziaur Rahman and M A Hannan announced the independence declaration from Chittagong. A K Khan drafted the English version of Zia's broadcast. These radio broadcasts began the journey of Swadhin Bangla Betar Kendra, which contributed heavily towards the Liberation. The Pakistani military, and supporting Razakar militias, carried out widespread atrocities against civilians in the city. Mukti Bahini naval commandos drowned several Pakistani warships during Operation Jackpot in August 1971. In December 1971, the Bangladesh Air Force and the Indian Air Force carried out the heavy bombing of facilities occupied by the Pakistani military. A naval blockade was also enforced.

After the war, the Soviet Union offer to clear mines in Chittagong Port at free of cost, while Sweden offered to clear mines in Mongla port. 22 vessels of the Soviet Pacific Fleet sailed from Vladivostok to Chittagong in May 1972. The process of clearing mines in the dense water harbor took nearly a year and claimed the life of Soviet marine Yuri V Redkin. Chittagong soon regained its status as a major port, with cargo tonnage surpassing pre-war levels in 1973. In the immediate aftermath of 1971, many industries were nationalized. But in Chittagong, factories and business properties were given back to their private owners. The Ispahani family had to write only one letter in order to get back all their properties from the Awami League government of Prime Minister Sheikh Mujibur Rahman.

In free market reforms launched by President Ziaur Rahman in the late 1970s, the city became home to the first export processing zones in Bangladesh. Zia was assassinated during an attempted military coup in Chittagong in 1981. The 1991 Bangladesh cyclone inflicted heavy damage on the city. The Japanese government financed the construction of several heavy industries and an international airport in the 1980s and 1990s. Bangladeshi private sector investments increased since 1991, especially with the formation of the Chittagong Stock Exchange in 1995. A new airport opened in 2000. The port city has been the pivot of Bangladesh's emerging economy in recent years, with the country's rising GDP growth rate. Chittagong has seen several infrastructure projects taken up by the government of Prime Minister Sheikh Hasina, including the Chittagong Elevated Expressway, the first underwater tunnel in South Asia, the expansion of its port, and new parks, power plants and flyovers.

== Geography ==
=== Topography ===
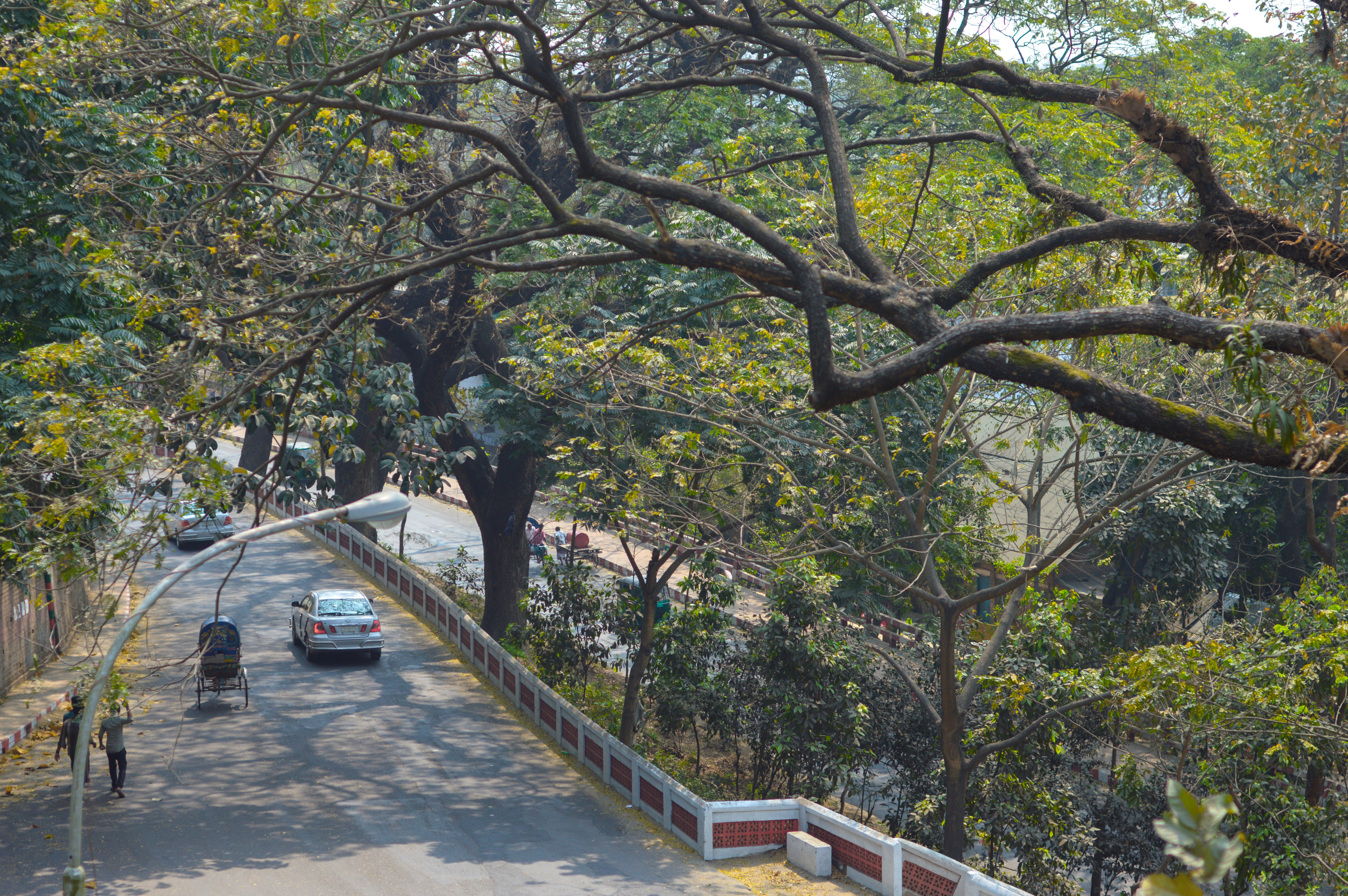
Mohammad Yusuf Chowdhury Road in the Tigerpass area, an example of the city's hilly landscape

Chittagong lies at 22°20′06″N 91°49′57″E. It straddles the coastal foothills of the Chittagong Hill Tracts in south-eastern Bangladesh. The Karnaphuli River runs along the southern banks of the city, including its central business district. The river enters the Bay of Bengal in an estuary located 12 kilometres (7.5 mi) west of downtown Chittagong. Mount Sitakunda is the highest peak in Chittagong District, with an elevation of 351 metres (1,152 ft). Within the city itself, the highest peak is Batali Hill at 85.3 metres (280 ft). Chittagong has many lakes that were created under the Mughal rule. In 1924, an engineering team of the Assam Bengal Railway established the Foy's Lake.

Major sediment outflows from the Ganges (or Padma) and Brahmaputra rivers form tidal flats around the city.

=== Ecological hinterland ===
The Chittagong Division is known for its rich biodiversity. Over 2000 of Bangladesh's 6000 flowering plants grow in the region. Its hills and jungles are laden with waterfalls, fast flowing river streams and elephant reserves. St. Martin's Island, within the Chittagong Division, is the only coral island in the country. The fishing port of Cox's Bazar is home to one of the world's longest natural beaches. In the east, there are the three hill districts of Bandarban, Rangamati, and Khagrachari, home to the highest mountains in Bangladesh. The region has numerous protected areas, including the Teknaf Game Reserve and the Sitakunda Botanical Garden and Eco Park.

Patenga beach in the main seafront of Chittagong, located 14 kilometres (8.7 mi) west of the city.

=== Climate ===
Under the Köppen climate classification, Chittagong has a tropical monsoon climate (Am).

Chittagong is vulnerable to North Indian Ocean tropical cyclones. The deadliest tropical cyclone to strike Chittagong was the 1991 Bangladesh cyclone, which killed 138,000 people and left as many as 10 million homeless.

Climate data for Chittagong (1991–2020 normals, extremes 1937–present)
Month	Jan	Feb	Mar	Apr	May	Jun	Jul	Aug	Sep	Oct	Nov	Dec	Year
Record high °C (°F)	33.4 (92.1)	36.0 (96.8)	37.2 (99.0)	39.6 (103.3)	39.5 (103.1)	37.7 (99.9)	36.5 (97.7)	35.8 (96.4)	36.7 (98.1)	36.0 (96.8)	35.5 (95.9)	33.5 (92.3)	39.6 (103.3)
Mean daily maximum °C (°F)	25.9 (78.6)	28.6 (83.5)	31.1 (88.0)	32.2 (90.0)	32.5 (90.5)	31.8 (89.2)	31.1 (88.0)	31.4 (88.5)	31.9 (89.4)	31.7 (89.1)	30.0 (86.0)	27.1 (80.8)	30.4 (86.7)
Daily mean °C (°F)	19.8 (67.6)	22.5 (72.5)	26.1 (79.0)	28.2 (82.8)	28.8 (83.8)	28.6 (83.5)	28.1 (82.6)	28.2 (82.8)	28.4 (83.1)	27.8 (82.0)	24.9 (76.8)	21.2 (70.2)	26.1 (79.0)
Mean daily minimum °C (°F)	14.2 (57.6)	16.7 (62.1)	21.0 (69.8)	24.1 (75.4)	25.2 (77.4)	25.6 (78.1)	25.5 (77.9)	25.6 (78.1)	25.5 (77.9)	24.4 (75.9)	20.5 (68.9)	16.0 (60.8)	22.0 (71.6)
Record low °C (°F)	7.7 (45.9)	10.6 (51.1)	14.0 (57.2)	16.5 (61.7)	18.0 (64.4)	20.5 (68.9)	21.5 (70.7)	21.0 (69.8)	21.0 (69.8)	19.5 (67.1)	11.0 (51.8)	9.9 (49.8)	7.7 (45.9)
Average precipitation mm (inches)	9 (0.4)	21 (0.8)	49 (1.9)	103 (4.1)	333 (13.1)	627 (24.7)	718 (28.3)	533 (21.0)	282 (11.1)	231 (9.1)	47 (1.9)	11 (0.4)	2,964 (116.8)
Average precipitation days (≥ 1 mm)	1	1	3	6	14	19	21	21	17	10	3	1	117
Average relative humidity (%)	73	70	74	77	79	83	85	85	83	81	78	75	79
Mean monthly sunshine hours	231.5	232.4	245.8	242.2	220.3	163.0	151.9	163.5	176.0	218.7	235.9	230.6	2,511.8
Source 1: NOAA
Source 2: Bangladesh Meteorological Department (humidity 1981-2010), Sistema de Classificación Bioclimática Mundial (extremes)

== Government ==
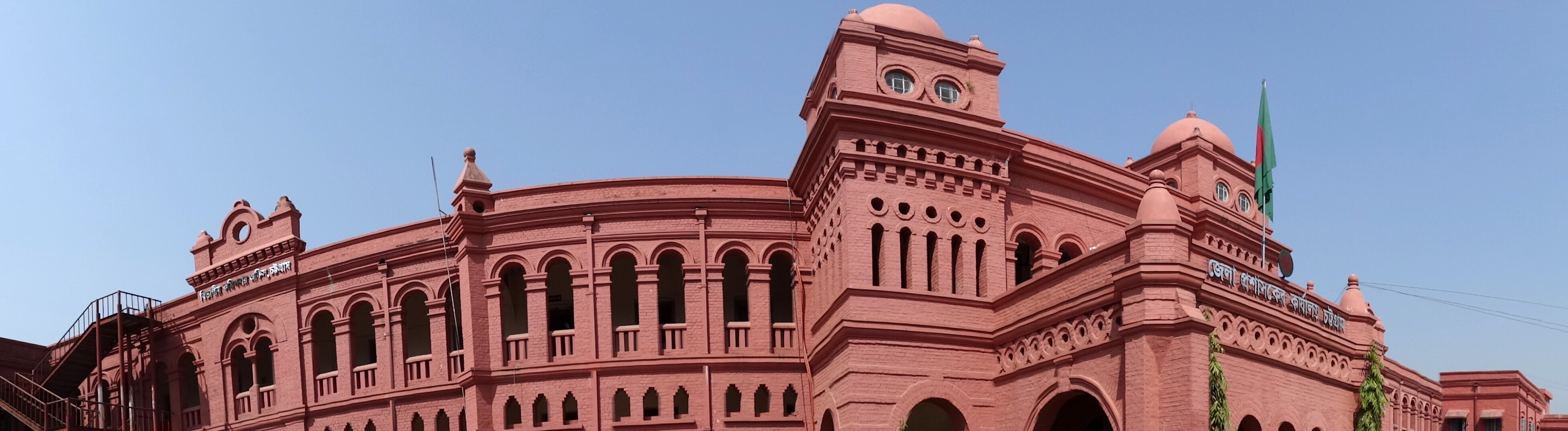
Panorama of the Chittagong Court Building on Court Hill (also known as "Porir Pahar" Bengali: পরীর পাহাড়, lit. 'Fairy hill')

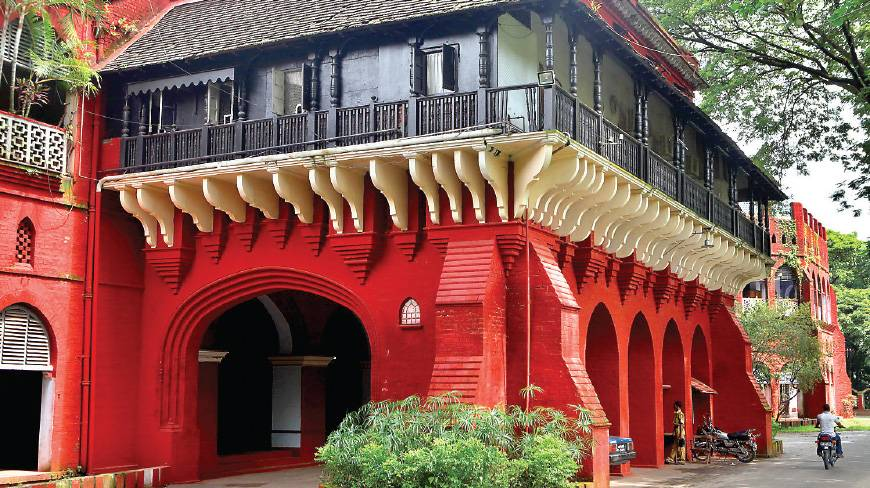
The British-era Central Railway Building was the headquarters of the Assam Bengal Railway.

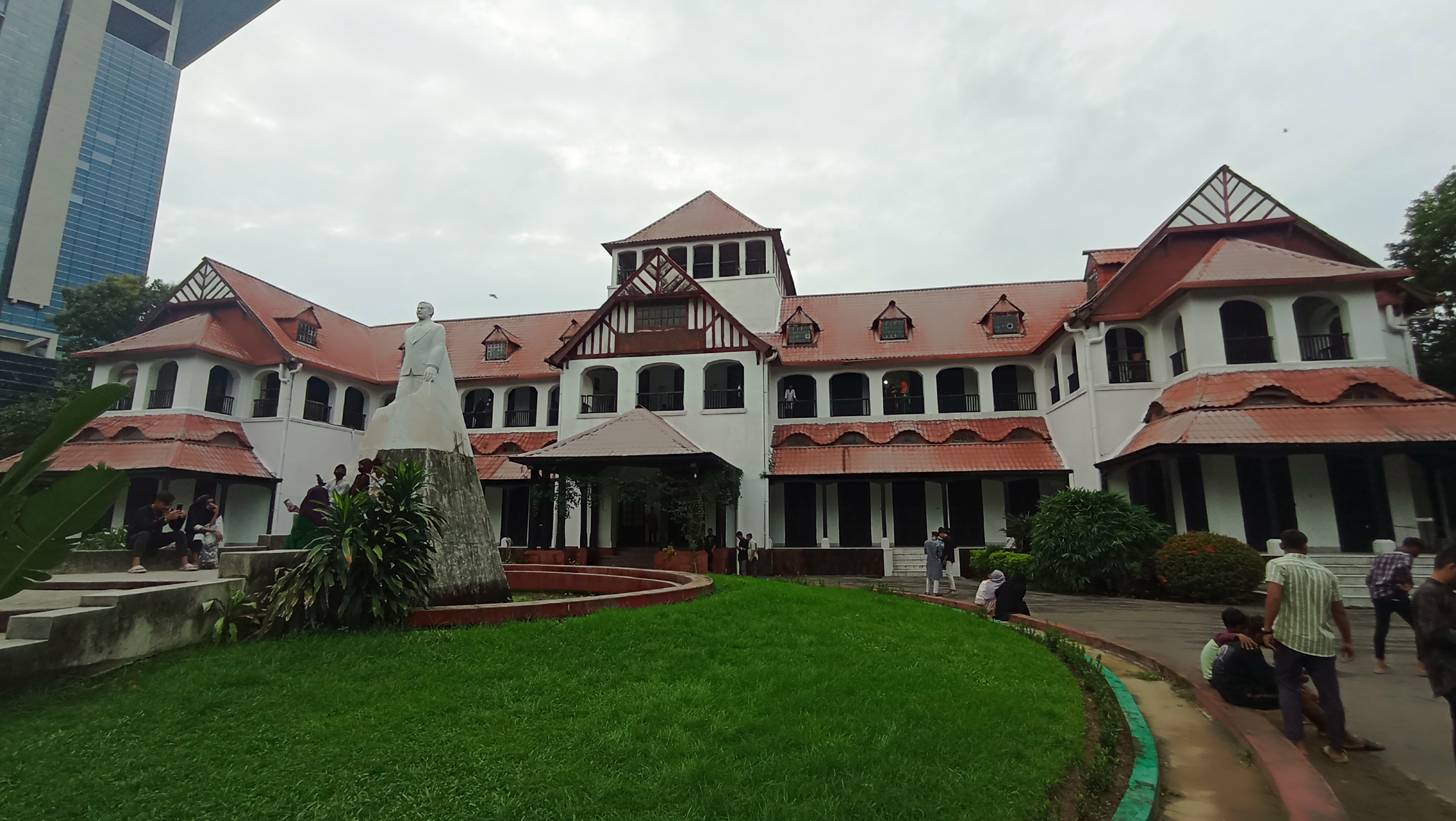
Zia Memorial Museum was formerly the Circuit House

The Chittagong City Corporation (CCC) is responsible for governing municipal areas in the Chittagong Metropolitan Area. It is headed by the mayor of Chittagong. The mayor and ward councillors are elected every five years. The mayor is Shahadat Hossain, as of December 2024. The city corporation's mandate is limited to basic civic services, however, the CCC is credited for keeping Chittagong one of the cleaner and most eco-friendly cities in Bangladesh. Its principal sources of revenue are municipal taxes and conservancy charges. The Chittagong Development Authority is responsible for implementing the city's urban planning.

The deputy commissioner and district magistrate are the chiefs of local administration as part of the Government of Bangladesh. Law enforcement is provided by the Chittagong Metropolitan Police and the Rapid Action Battalion-7. The district and sessions judges are the heads of the local judiciary on behalf of the Supreme Court of Bangladesh. The Divisional Special Judge's Court is located in the colonial-era Chittagong Court Building.

=== Military ===
Chittagong is a strategically important military port on the Bay of Bengal. The Chittagong Naval Area is the principal base of the Bangladesh Navy and the home port of most Bangladeshi warships. The Bangladesh Naval Academy and the navy's elite special force- Special Warfare Diving and Salvage (SWADS) are also based in the city. The Bangladesh Army's 24th Infantry Division is based in Chittagong Cantonment, and the Bangladesh Air Force maintains the BAF Zahurul Haq Air Base in Chittagong. The city is also home to the Bangladesh Military Academy, the premier training institute for the country's armed forces.

=== Diplomatic representation ===
In the 1860s, the American consulate-general in the Bengal Presidency included a consular agency in Chittagong. Today, Chittagong hosts an assistant high commission of India and a consulate general of Russia. The city also has honorary consulates of Turkey, Japan, Germany, South Korea, Malaysia, Italy, and the Philippines.

== Economy ==
Top publicly traded
companies in Chittagong,
in 2014
Jamuna Oil Company
BSRM
Padma Oil Company
PHP
Meghna Petroleum
GPH Ispat
Aramit Cement
Western Marine Shipyard
RSRM
Hakkani Pulp & Paper
Chittagong Stock Exchange

A substantial share of Bangladesh's national GDP is attributed to Chittagong. As of the early 2000s, the port city contributed 12% of the nation's economy. Chittagong generates for 40% of Bangladesh's industrial output, 80% of its international trade and 50% of its governmental revenue. The Chittagong Stock Exchange has more than 700 listed companies, with a market capitalisation of US$32 billion in June 2015. The city is home to many of the country's oldest and largest corporations. The Port of Chittagong handled US$60 billion in annual trade in 2011, ranking 3rd in South Asia after the Port of Mumbai and the Port of Colombo. The port is part of the Maritime Silk Road that runs from the Chinese coast via the Suez Canal to the Mediterranean and on to the Upper Adriatic region of Trieste with rail connections to Central and Eastern Europe.

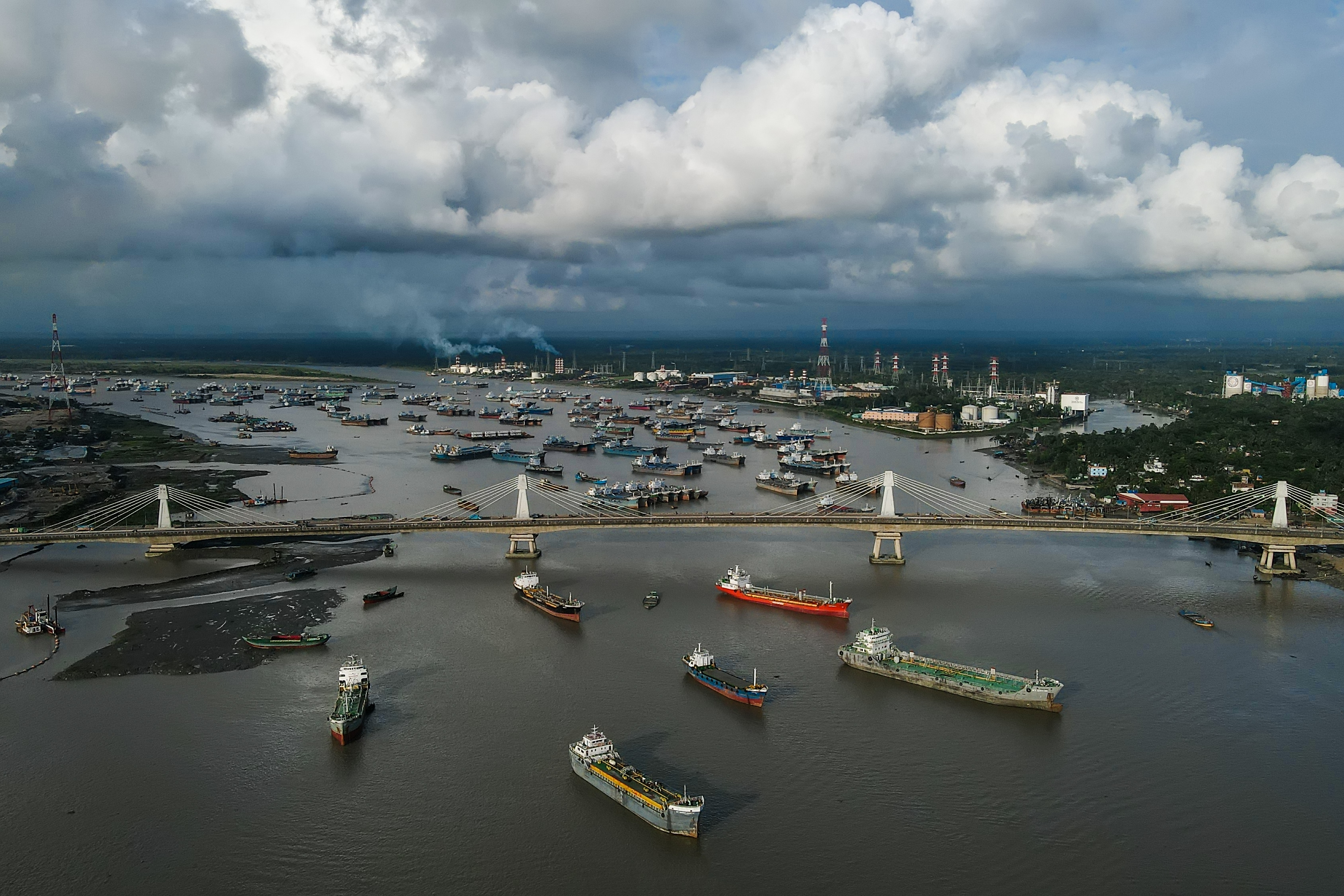
Industrial plants near the Shah Amanat Bridge

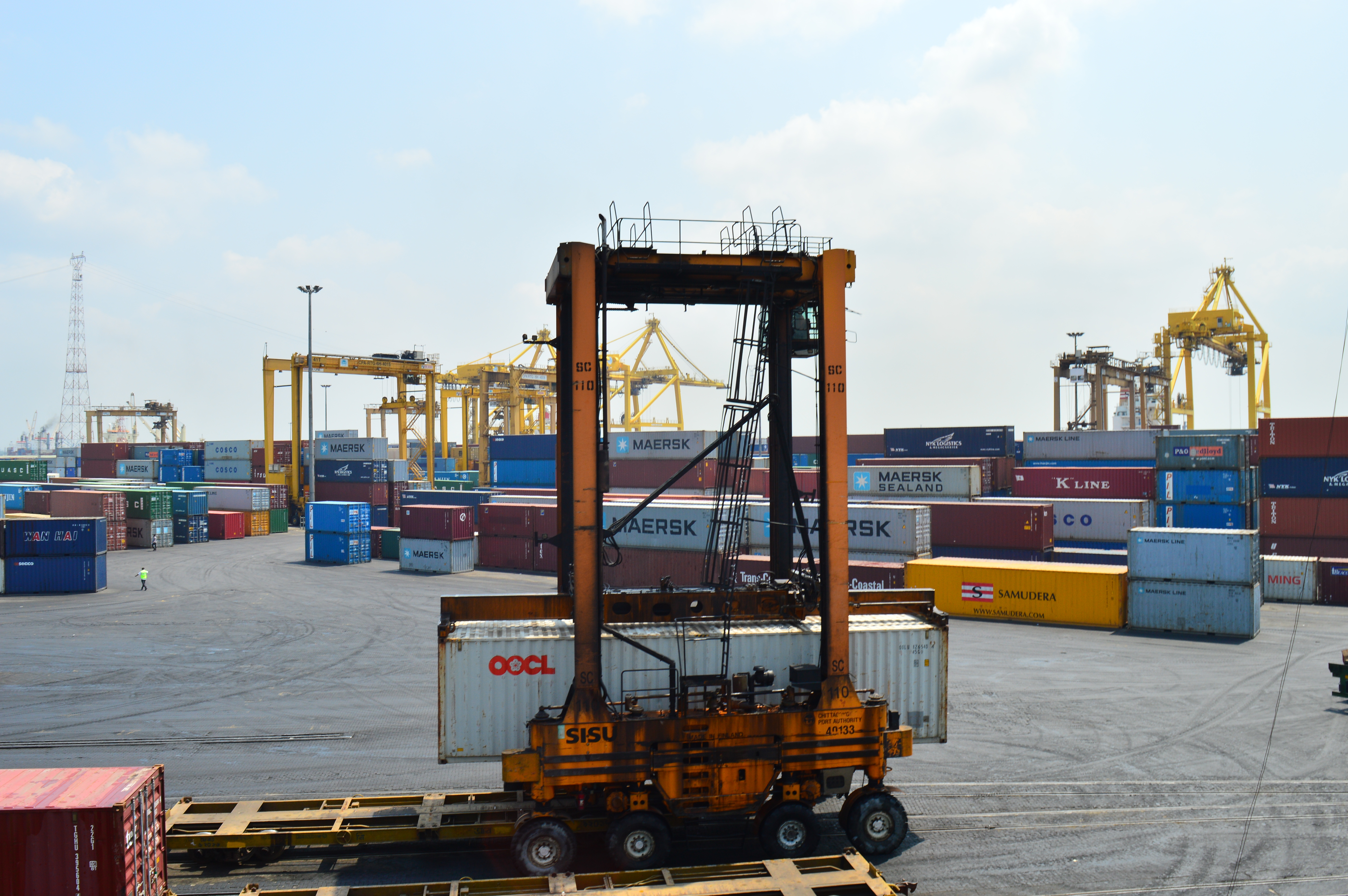
Straddle carriers moving shipping containers in Chittagong Port

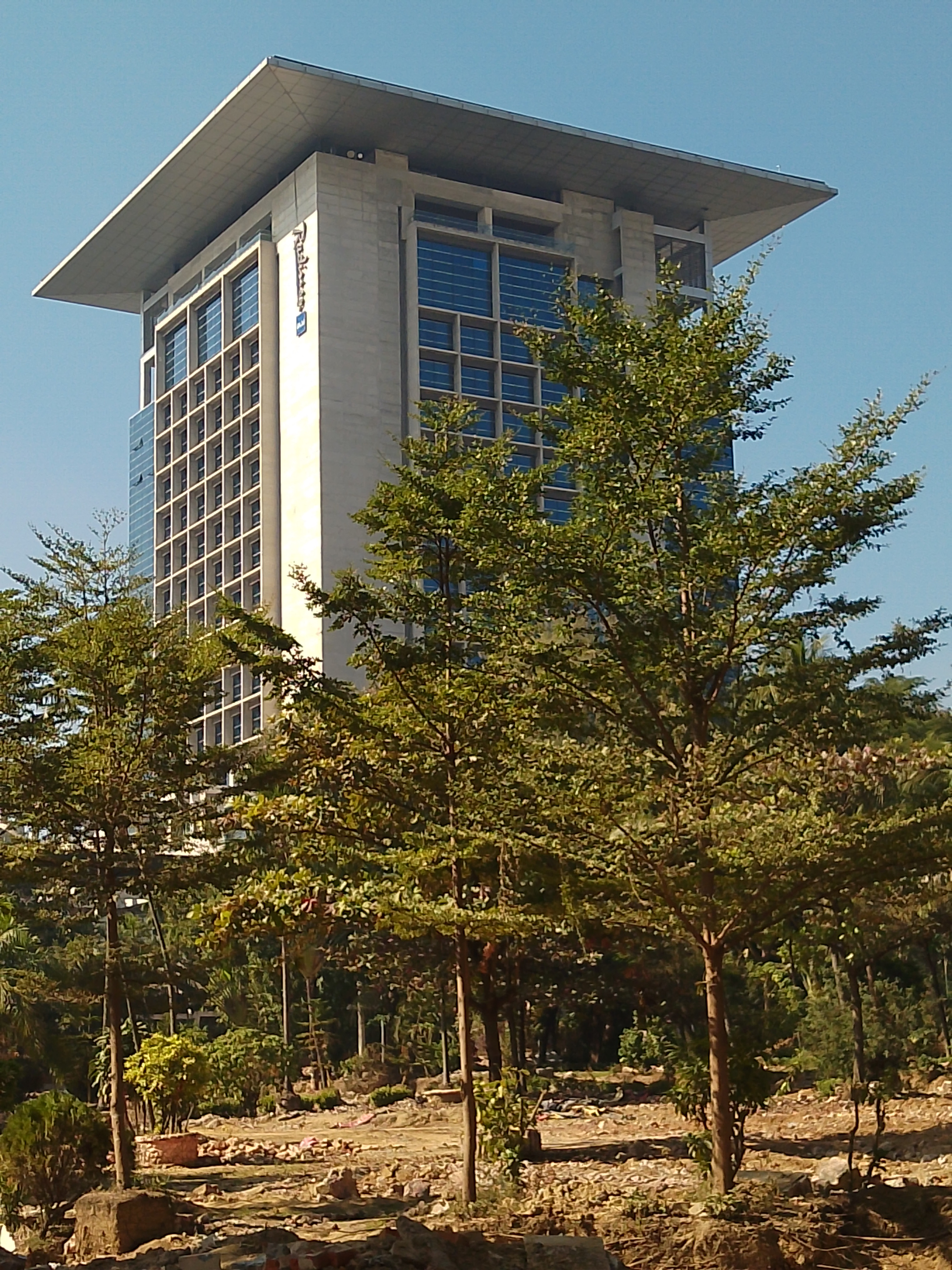
The Radisson Blu Hotel, Chittagong

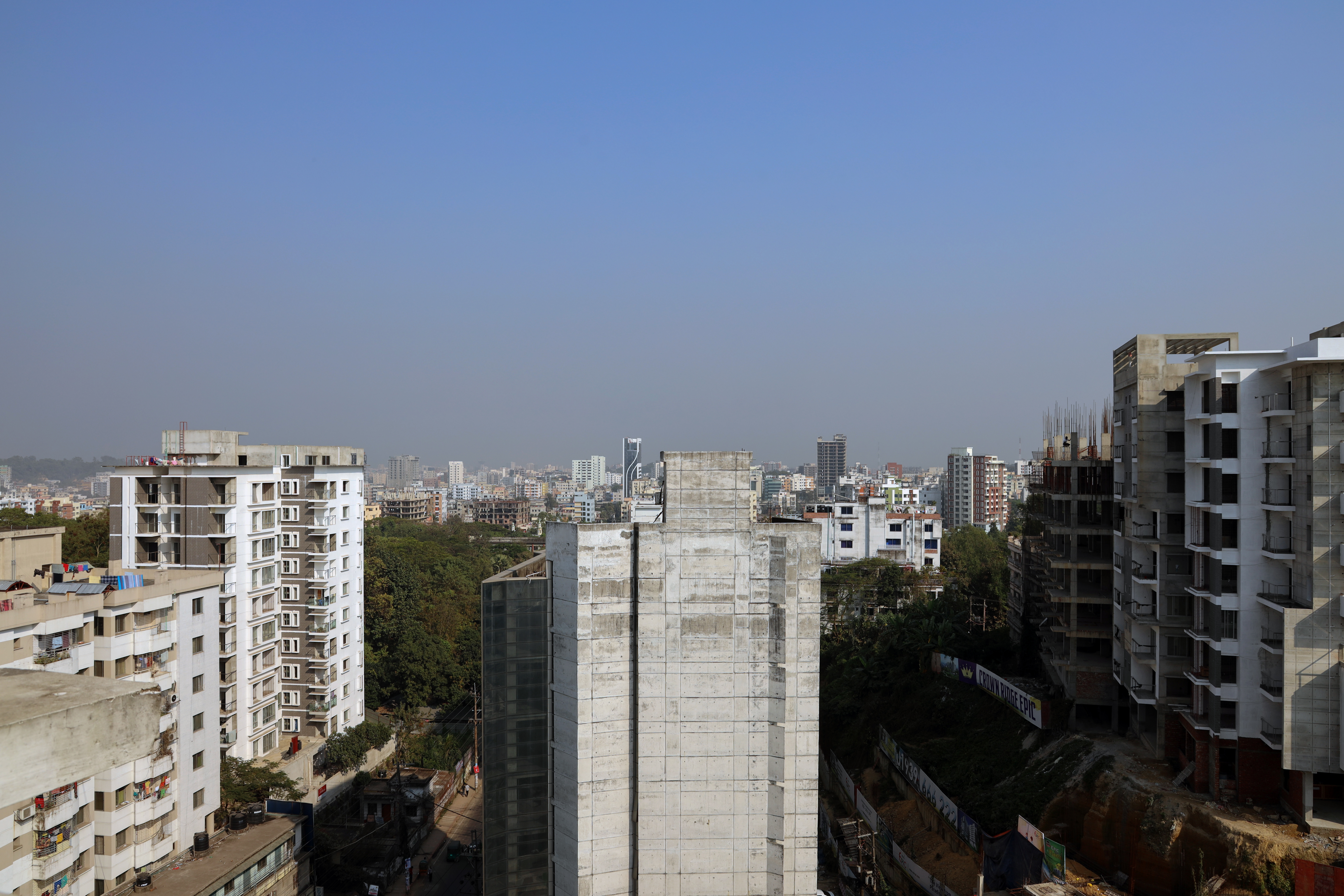
Apartments in Khulshi

The Agrabad area is the main central business district of the city. Major Bangladeshi conglomerates headquartered in Chittagong include M. M. Ispahani Limited, BSRM, A K Khan & Company, PHP Group, James Finlay Bangladesh, the Habib Group, the S. Alam Group of Industries, Seamark Group, KDS Group, Abul Khair Group and the T. K. Group of Industries. Major state-owned firms headquartered there include Pragati Industries, the Jamuna Oil Company, the Bangladesh Shipping Corporation, and the Padma Oil Company. The Chittagong Export Processing Zone was ranked by the UK-based magazine, Foreign Direct Investment, as one of the leading special economic zones in the world, in 2010. Other SEZs include the Karnaphuli Export Processing Zone and Korean EPZ. The city's key industrial sectors include petroleum, steel, shipbuilding, chemicals, pharmaceuticals, textiles, jute, leather goods, vegetable oil refineries, glass manufacturing, electronics and motor vehicles. The Chittagong Tea Auction sets the price of Bangladesh Tea. The Eastern Refinery is Bangladesh's largest oil refinery. GlaxoSmithKline has had operations in Chittagong since 1967. Western Marine Shipyard is a leading Bangladeshi shipbuilder and exporter of medium-sized ocean-going vessels. In 2011–12, Chittagong exported approximately US$4.5 billion in ready-made garments. The Karnaphuli Paper Mills were established in 1953.

International banks operating in Chittagong include HSBC, Standard Chartered and Citibank NA. Chittagong is often called Bangladesh's commercial capital due to its diversified industrial base and seaport. The port city has ambitions to develop as a global financial centre and regional transshipment hub, given its proximity to North East India, Burma, Nepal, Bhutan and Southwest China.

By 2024, the Chittagong-based S Alam Group emerged as one of Bangladesh's most powerful conglomerates, with interests in energy, commodities, infrastructure, economic zones, healthcare, textiles and fintech. S Alam's projects include a $640 million steel plant, a $2.6 billion power plant and a $3 billion renewable energy plant. It is investing 580 billion BDT in two industrial zones in Chittagong. S Alam also has substantial offshore assets, including a billion dollars' worth of real estate in Singapore. Its portfolio in Singapore includes the city-state's Hilton Garden Inn Serangoon hotel. The S Alam Group enjoys close ties with the ruling Awami League party in Bangladesh. The group has been subjected to intense media scrutiny.

=== Financial and commodity markets ===
- Chittagong Stock Exchange
- Chittagong Tea Auction

=== Trade associations ===
- Chittagong Chamber of Commerce & Industry

=== Industrial areas ===
- Chittagong Export Processing Zone
- Karnaphuli Export Processing Zone
- National Special Economic Zone, Mirsarai
- Korean Export Processing Zone, Anwara
- Chinese Economic and Industrial Zone, Anwara
- Maheshkhali Economic Zone, Matarbari
- Kalurghat Heavy Industrial Area

== Architecture ==
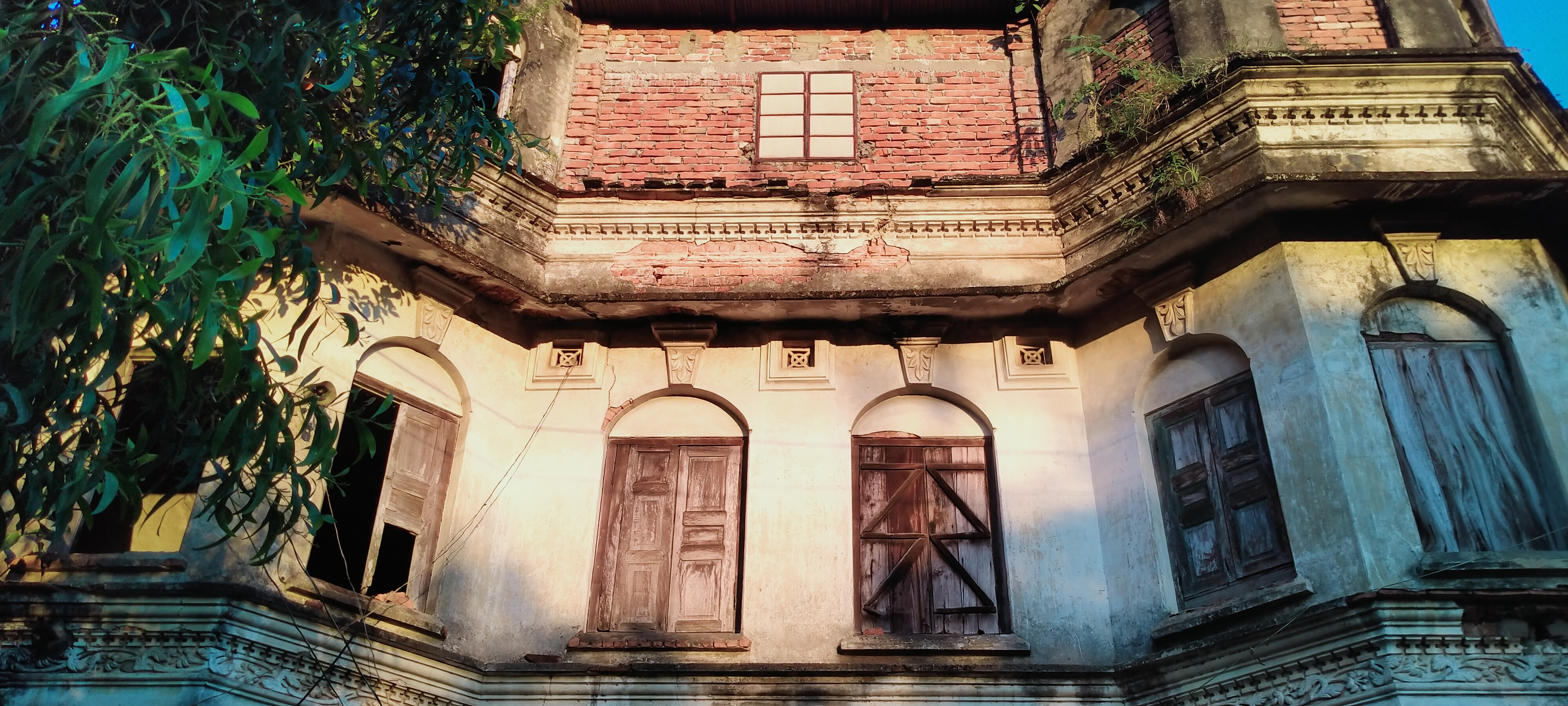
Abandoned colonial house of Satya Saha, which was built in 1890

The Anderkilla Shahi Jame Mosque is a well-known Mughal property in Chittagong. Anderkilla (Bengali: আন্দরকিল্লা) means "Inner fort". The mosque was built in 1667 by Umed Khan, the son of Shaista Khan, after the Mughal conquest of Chittagong. The mosque is the only surviving part of a hilltop Mughal fort. A surviving remnant of the 17th century Portuguese presence is Darul Adalat in the premises of Government Hazi Mohammad Mohsin College, Chittagong. The Kadam Mubarak Mosque in Jamal Khan was built in 1723 by a faujdar during the reign of the Nawabs of Bengal. During British rule, colonial officials lived in hilltop bungalows, which would feature a spacious balcony or verandah, chimneys, fireplaces and big gardens. The Firingi Bazaar has many colonial houses which belonged to rich local residents. The well-known buildings from the British colonial period include the Battali Railway Station, Central Railway Building, Chittagong Circuit House and Chittagong Court Building.

The old Circuit House was originally built in the style of Tudor Revival architecture. The Chittagong Court Building exhibits influence of Neoclassical architecture from the late 19th century. JM Sen Hall was a town hall built in 1920. One of the grand old mansions of Chittagong is the PK Sen Bhaban. The First Karnaphuli Bridge, which was a steel bridge, was built in 1930. The Kalurghat Bridge was completed in 1931. Stripped Classicism and elements of art deco can be seen in Agrabad. M. M. Ispahani Limited relocated its head office to Chittagong from Calcutta after the partition of India; the Ispahani building in Agrabad was influenced by the art deco style. Another building with 1930s classical and art deco elements is the headquarters of the Jamuna Oil Company. The building has a dome and modernist columns inspired by the style of the 1930s and 1940s.

== Culture ==
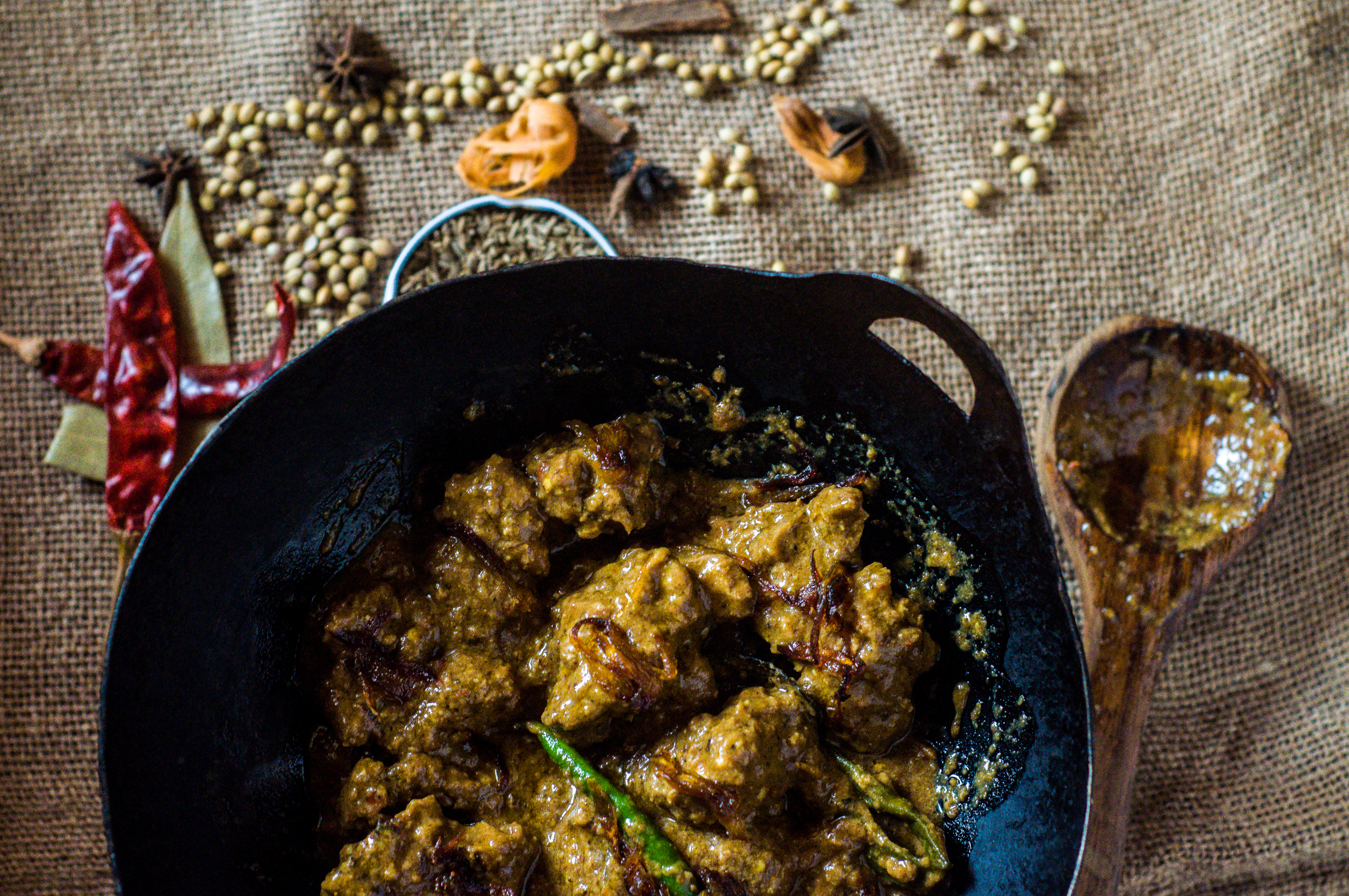
Mezbani beef, a traditional dish of Chittagong

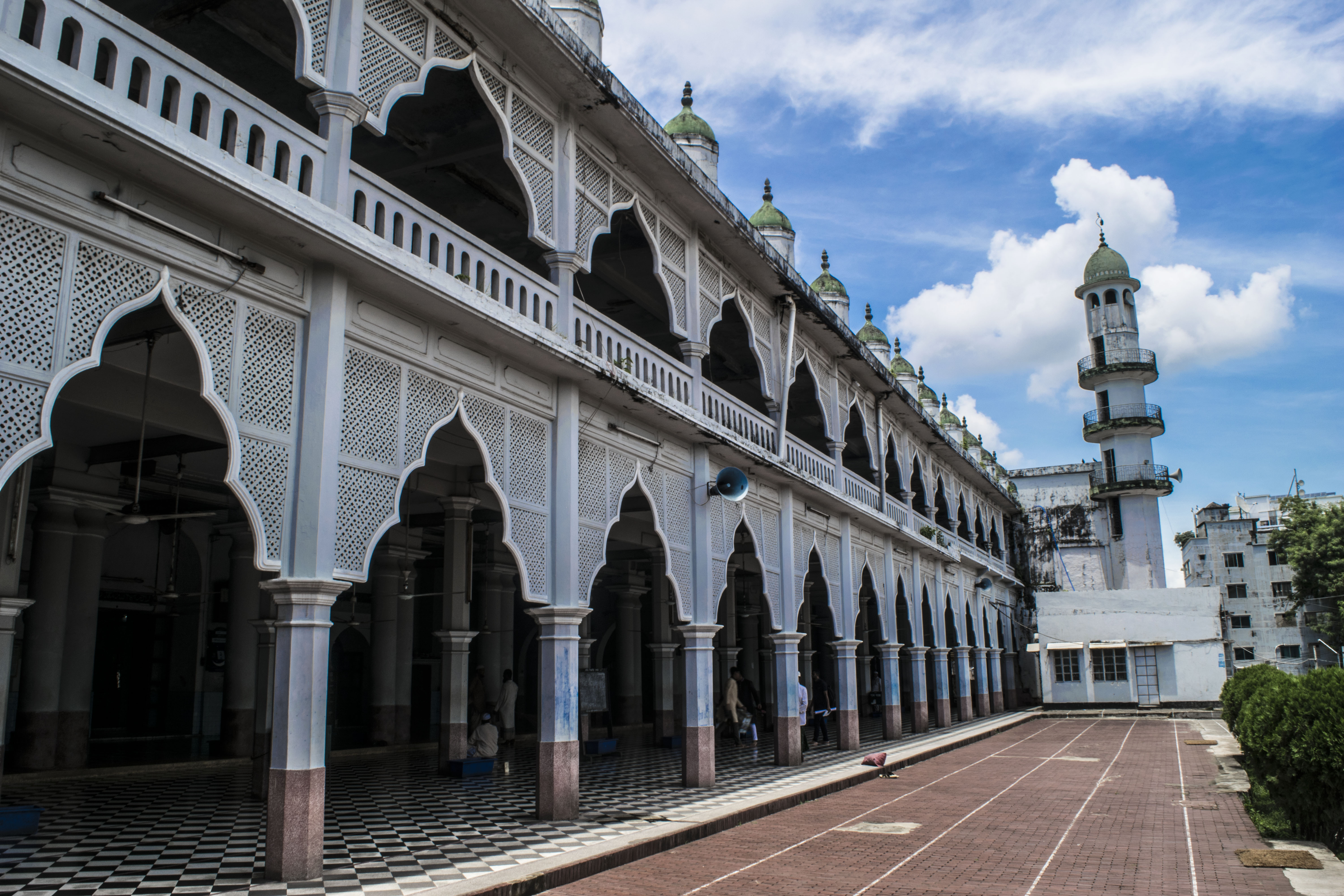
Anderkilla Shahi Jame Mosque built during the Mughal era

An inhabitant of Chittagong is called Chittagonian in English. For centuries, the port city has been a melting pot for people from all over the world. Its historic trade networks have left a lasting impact on its language, culture, and cuisine. The Chittagonian language, although identified as a nonstandard dialect of Bengali, is considered to be a separate language by many linguists. The Chittagonian language has many Arabic, Persian, English and Portuguese loanwords. The popular traditional feast of Mezban features the serving of hot beef dish with white rice. Another dish named kala-bhuna of Chittagong, made with traditional spices, mustard oil, and beef through a special cooking style, is also renowned all over Bangladesh. The cultivation of pink pearls is a historic activity in Chittagong. Its Mughal-era name, Islamabad (City of Islam), continues to be used in the old city. The name was given due to the port city's history as a gateway for early Islamic missionaries in Bengal. Notable Islamic architecture in Chittagong can be seen in the historic Bengal Sultanate-era Hammadyar Mosque and the Mughal Fort of Anderkilla. Chittagong is known as the Land of the Twelve Saints due to the prevalence of major Sufi Muslim shrines in the district. Historically, Sufism played an important role in the spread of Islam in the region. Prominent dargahs include the mausoleums of Shah Amanat, Badr Auliya, Miskin Shah, Garibullah Shah and the shrine of Bayazid Bastami among many others. The Bastami shrine hosts a pond of black softshell turtles, a critically endangered species of freshwater turtle.

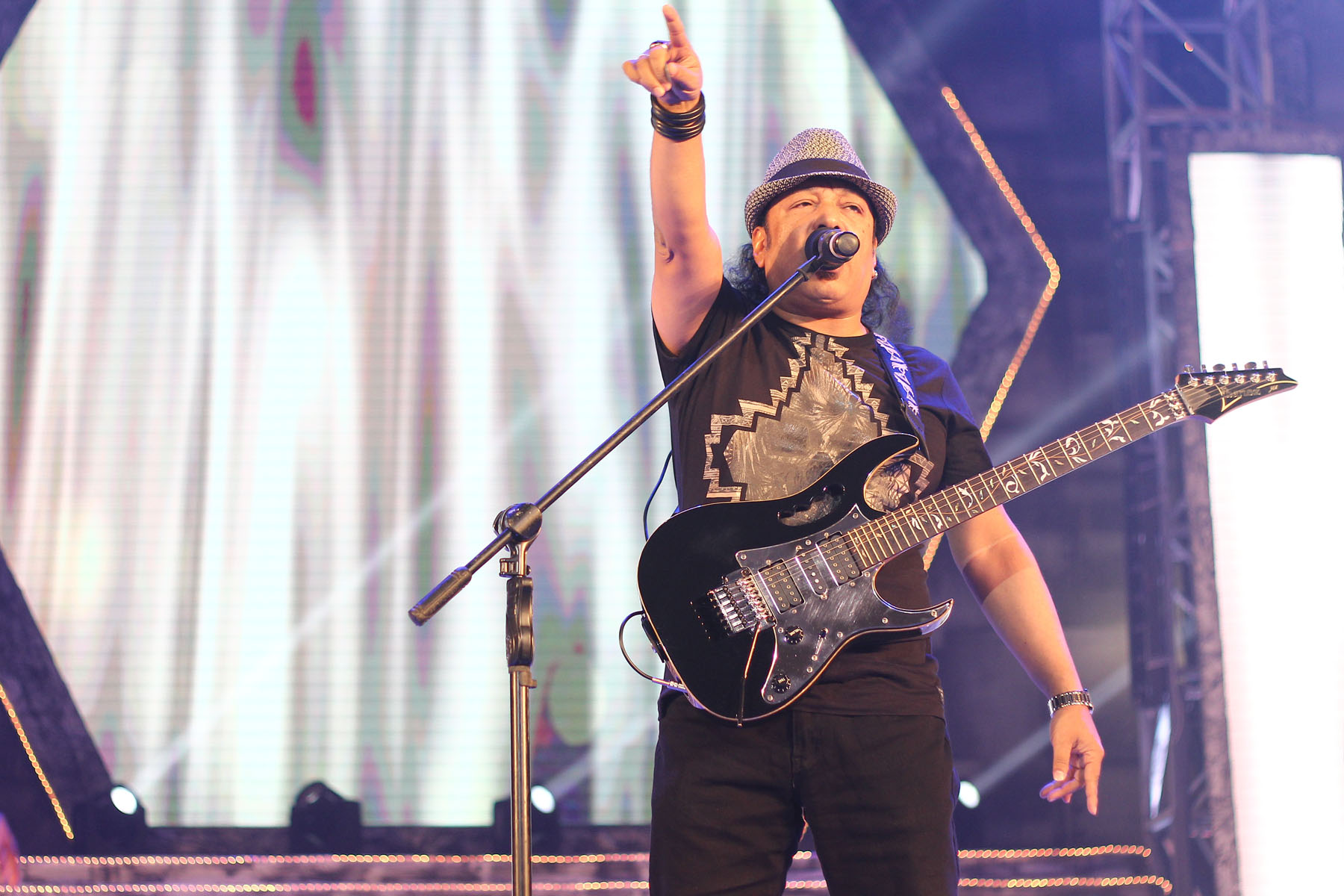
LRB Band founder Ayub Bachchu

During the medieval period, many poets thrived in the region when it was part of the Bengal Sultanate and the Kingdom of Mrauk U. Under the patronage of Sultan Alauddin Husain Shah's governor in Chittagong, Kabindra Parameshvar wrote his Pandabbijay, a Bengali adaptation of the Mahabharata. Daulat Qazi lived in the region during the 17th-century reign of the Kingdom of Mrauk U. Chittagong is home to several important Hindu temples, including the Chandranath Temple on the outskirts of the city, which is dedicated to the Hindu goddess Sita. The city also hosts the country's largest Buddhist monastery and council of monks. The Roman Catholic Diocese of Chittagong is the oldest catholic mission in Bengal.

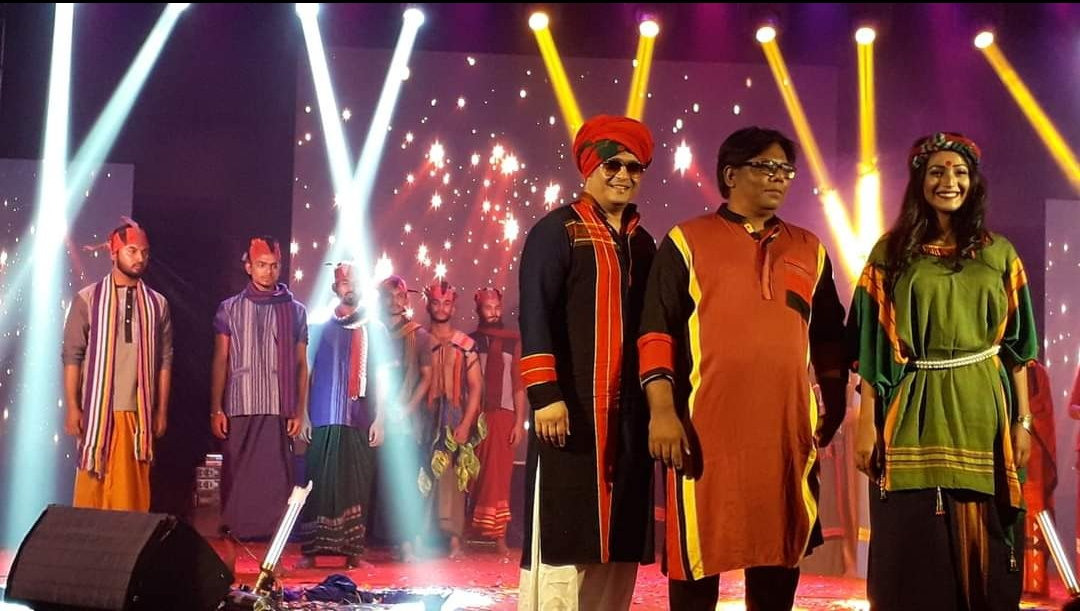
Shimul Khaled (middle) is credited with starting the fashion show trend in Chittagong

Major cultural organizations in the city include the Theatre Institute Chittagong and the Chittagong Performing Arts Academy. The city has a vibrant contemporary art scene.

Being home to the pioneering rock bands in the country like Souls and LRB, Chittagong is regarded as the "birthplace of Bangladeshi rock music".

Chittagong's fashion industry blends traditional heritage with modern trends. The city’s contemporary fashion show culture was pioneered by designer Shimul Khaled, who is credited with introducing the first runway shows to the region.

There is also the Chattogram City Corporation Public Library.

== Demographics ==
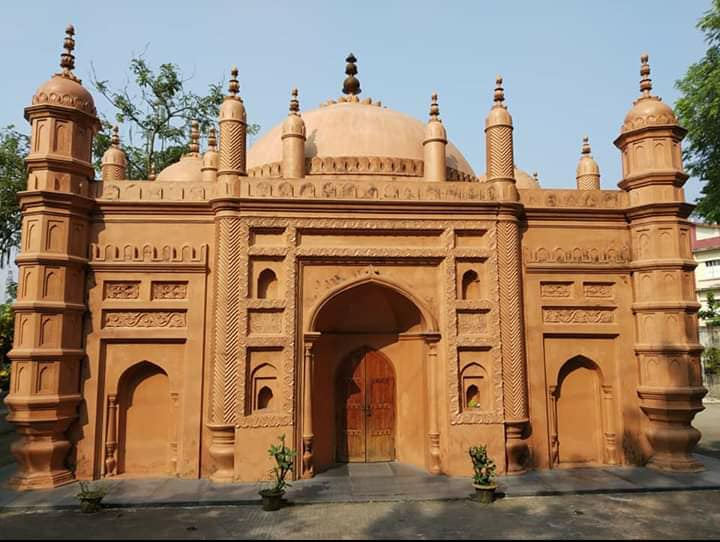
Asgar Ali Chowdhury Jame Mosque, one of the mosques in Chittagong

Iskcon Shrikrishna Temple

Historical population

Year	Pop.	±% p.a.
1931	53,156	—
1941	92,301	+5.67%
1991	1,392,958	+5.58%

Year	Pop.	±% p.a.
2001	2,023,489	+3.80%
2011	2,582,401	+2.47%
2022	3,227,246	+2.05%

sources:citypopulation.de

At the 2022 Census, Chittagong had a population of 3,230,507. By gender, the population was 50.89% male and 49.11% female, and the literacy rate in the city was approximately 84.49% percent.

Muslims, numbering approximately 2,841,595, form the overwhelming majority of the city's population, with the rest being 329,566 Hindus, 53,181 Buddhist and 4,793 Christian.

Religions in Chittagong City (2022)
Religion	Percent
Muslims	87.97%
Hindus	10.20%
Buddhism	1.65%
Christianity	0.15%
Other or not stated	0.04%

Chittagong was a melting pot of ethnicities during the Bengal Sultanate and Mughal Bengal periods. Most Muslim settlements occurred during the medieval period in the city. Muslim traders, rulers and preachers from Persia and Arabia were the early Muslim settlers in Bengal region. The city has a relatively wealthy and economically influential Shia Muslim community, including Ismailis and Twelver Shias. The city also has many ethnic minorities, especially members of indigenous groups from the frontier hills of Chittagong Division, including Chakmas, Rakhines and Tripuris; as well as Rohingya refugees. The Bengali-speaking Theravada Buddhists of the area, known as Baruas, are one of the oldest communities in Chittagong and one of the last remnants of Buddhism in Bangladesh. Descendants of Portuguese settlers, often known as Firingis, also live in Chittagong, as well as Catholics, who largely live in the old Portuguese enclave of Paterghatta. There is also a small Urdu-speaking Bihari community living in the ethnic enclave known as Bihari Colony. Like other major urban centres in South Asia, Chittagong has experienced steady growth in its informal settlements as a result of the increasing economic activities in the city and emigration from rural areas. According to a poverty reduction publication of the International Monetary Fund, there were 1,814 slums within the city corporation area, inhabited by about 1.8 million slum dwellers, the second highest in the country after the capital, Dhaka. The slum dwellers often face eviction by the local authorities, charging them with illegal abode on government lands. In the early 1990s, Chittagong had a population of just over 1.5 million, of which there were an estimated 66,676 squatters living in 69 areas.

== Media and communications ==
Various newspapers, including daily, opposition, and business newspapers, are based in Chittagong. Daily newspapers include Dainik Azadi, Peoples View, The Daily Suprobhat Bangladesh, Daily Purbokone, Life, Karnafuli, Jyoti, Rashtrobarta and Azan. Furthermore, there are several weekly and monthly newspapers. These include weeklies such as Chattala, Jyoti, Sultan, Chattagram Darpan, and the monthlies such as Sanshodhani, Purobi, Mukulika, and Simanto. The only press council in Chittagong is the Chittagong Press Club. Government-owned Bangladesh Television, with its Chittagong station, and Bangladesh Betar have transmission centres in the city. Privately owned Ekushey Television formerly broadcast on VHF channel 9 in Chittagong during its existence on terrestrial television.

Chittagong has been featured in all aspects of Bangladeshi popular culture, including television, movies, journals, music, and books. Nearly all televisions and radios in Bangladesh have coverage in Chittagong. Renowned Bollywood film director Ashutosh Gowariker directed a movie based on the 1930s Chittagong Uprising, Movie's name is Khelein Hum Jee Jaan Sey in which Abhishek Bachchan played the lead role.

== Utilities ==
The southern zone of the Bangladesh Power Development Board is responsible for supplying electricity to city dwellers. The fire services are provided by the Bangladesh Fire Service & Civil Defence department, under the Ministry of Home Affairs. Total Electricity Consumption is approximately 1000 megawatts in the city proper. But in the whole Chittagong urban and city proper, it will be 1300 megawatts plus-minus. The power plant will be in production next year and its production power is 1320 megawatts and it creates Chittagong City as the energy production hub of Bangladesh

The water supply and sewage systems are managed by the Chittagong Water Supply and Sewerage Authority (Chittagong WASA). Water is primarily drawn from Karnaphuli River and then purified in the Mohra Purification Plant.

Chittagong has extensive GSM and CDMA coverage, served by all the major mobile operators of the country, including Grameenphone, Banglalink, Citycell, Robi, TeleTalk and Airtel Bangladesh. However, landline telephone services are provided through the state-owned Bangladesh Telegraph and Telephone Board (BTTB), as well as some private operators. BTTB also provides broadband Internet services, along with some private Internet service providers (ISPs), including the 4G service providers Banglalion and Qubee.

== Administrative area ==
Chittagong is divided into 16 thanas: Akbarshah, Bakoliya, Bandar, Bayazid, Chandgaon, Double Mooring, Halishahar, Khulshi, Kotwali, Pahartali, Panchlaish, Patenga, Chawkbazar, Sadarghat, EPZ, and Karnaphuli. The thanas are subdivided into 41 wards and 211 mahallas. 41 wards are governed by elected representatives under the Chattogram City Corporation.

Ward serial of Chittagong

serial no.	Ward Name
1	South Pahartali
2	Jalalabad
3	Panchlaish
4	Chandgaon
5	Mohra
6	East Sholashahar
7	West Sholashahar
8	Sholokbahar
9	North Pahartali
10	North Kattali
11	South Kattali
12	Saraipara
13	Pahartali
14	Lalkhan Bazar
15	Bagmaniram
16	Chawkbazar
17	West Bakalia
18	East Bakalia
19	South Bakalia
20	Dewan Bazar
21	Jamal khan
22	Enayet Bazar
23	North Pathantooly
24	North Agrabad
25	Rampur
26	North Halishahar
27	South Agrabad
28	Pathantooly
29	West Madarbari
30	East Madarbari
31	Alkaran
32	Andarkilla
33	Firingee Bazar
34	Patharghata
35	Boxirhat
36	Gosaildanga
37	North Middle Halishahar
38	South Middle Halishahar
39	South Halishahar
40	North Patenga
41	South Patenga

== Education and research ==
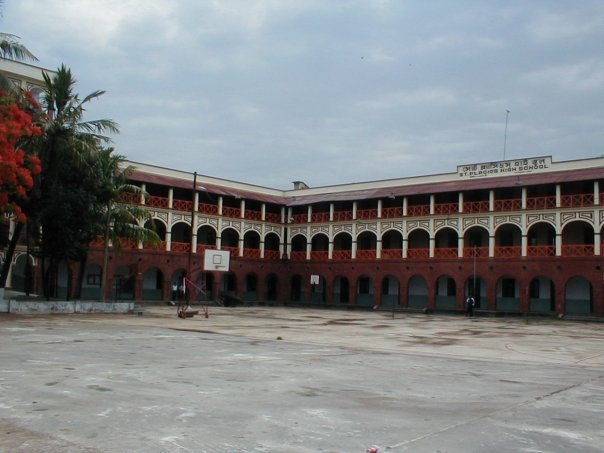
Saint Placid's High School was established in 1853

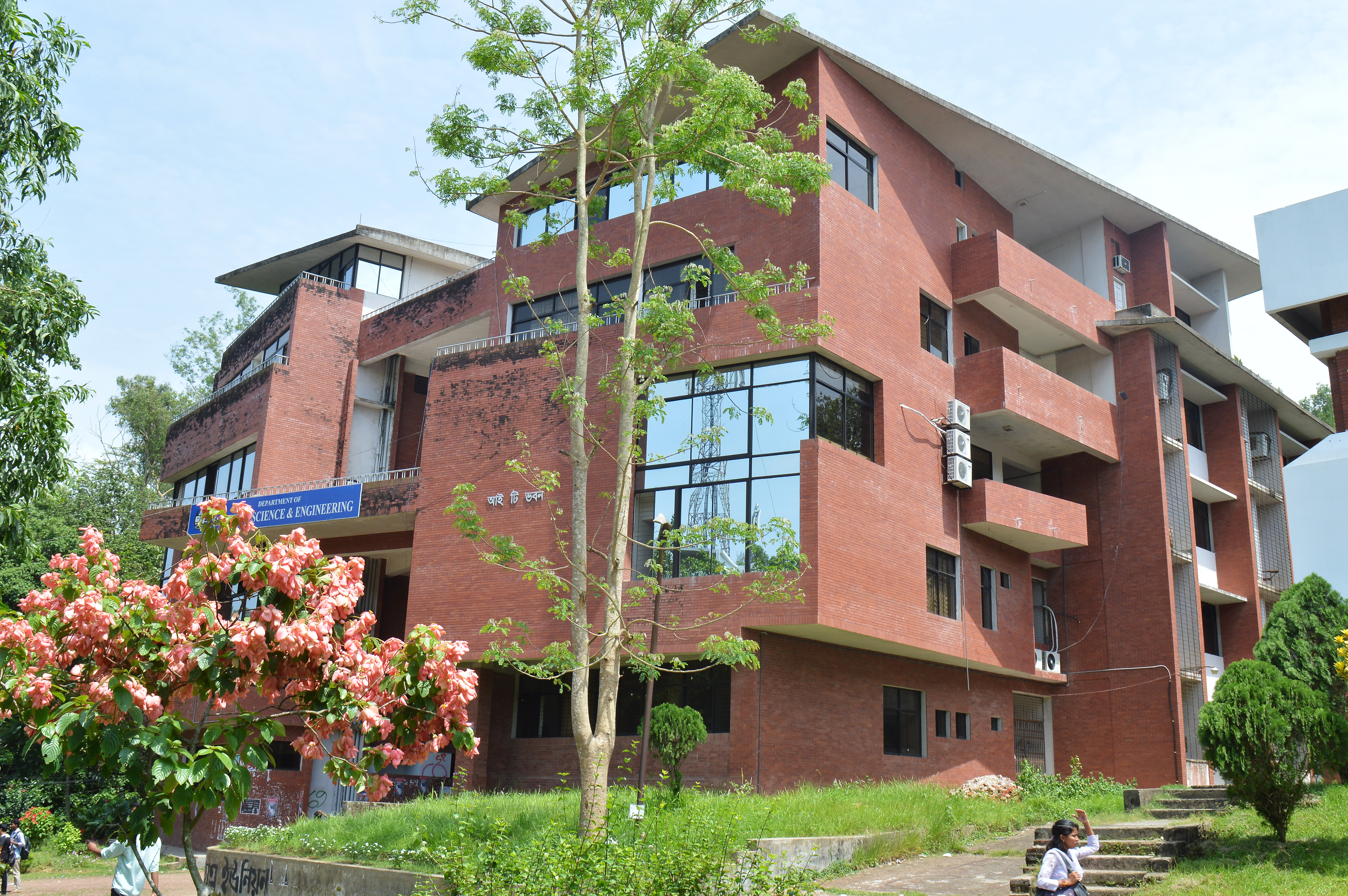
University of Chittagong

The education system of Chittagong is similar to that of rest of Bangladesh, with four main forms of schooling. The general education system, conveyed in both Bangla and English versions, follows the curriculum prepared by the National Curriculum and Textbook Board, part of the Ministry of Education. Students are required to take two major board examinations are :the Secondary School Certificate (SSC) and the Higher Secondary School Certificate (HSC) before moving onto higher education. The Board of Intermediate and Secondary Education, Chittagong is responsible for administering SSC and HSC examinations within the city. The Madrasah education system is primarily based on Islamic studies, though other subjects are also taught. Students are prepared according to the Dakhil and Alim examinations, which are controlled by the Bangladesh Madrasah Education Board and are equivalent to SSC and HSC examinations of the general education system respectively. There are also several private schools in the city, usually referred to as English medium schools, which follow the General Certificate of Education.

The British Council supervises the O Levels and A levels examinations, conducted twice a year, through the Cambridge International and Edexcel examination boards. The Technical and Vocational education system is governed by the Directorate of Technical Education (DTE) and follow the curriculum prepared by Bangladesh Technical Education Board (BTEB). Chittagong College, established in 1869, is the earliest modern institution for higher education in the city. Chittagong Veterinary and Animal Sciences University is the only public university located in Chittagong city. Chittagong Medical College is the only government medical college in Chittagong.

University of Chittagong is located 22 kilometres (14 miles) north and Chittagong University of Engineering and Technology is located 25 kilometres (16 miles) north of the Chittagong city. The University of Chittagong, established in 1966 is one of the largest universities in Bangladesh. Chittagong University of Engineering and Technology, established in 1968, is one of the five public engineering universities in Bangladesh and the only engineering university in the Chittagong Division.

The city also hosts several other private universities and medical colleges. The BGC Trust University Bangladesh, Chittagong Independent University (CIU), Asian University for Women, Port City International University, East Delta University, International Islamic University, Premier University, Southern University, University of Information Technology and Sciences and the University of Science & Technology Chittagong are among them.

=== Research institutes ===
- Bangladesh Forest Research Institute
- Bangladesh Institute of Tropical and Infectious Diseases
- Bangladesh Tea Board

== Health ==
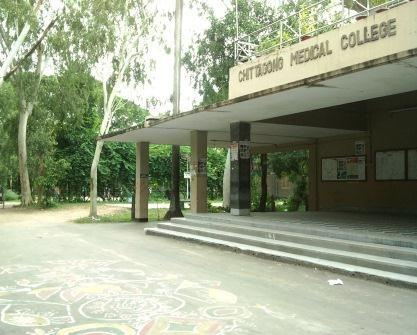
Chittagong Medical College and Hospital

The Chittagong Medical College Hospital is the largest state-owned hospital in Chittagong. The Chittagong General Hospital, established in 1901, is the oldest hospital in the city. The Bangladesh Institute of Tropical and Infectious Diseases (BITID) is based the city. Other government-run medical centers in the city include the Family Welfare Centre, TB Hospital, Infectious Disease Hospital, Diabetic Hospital, Mother and Children Hospital, and the Police Hospital. Among the city's private hospitals are the Bangabandhu Memorial Hospital (BBMH), Chittagong Metropolitan Hospital, Chevron Clinic, Surgiscope Hospital, CSCR, Centre Point Hospital, Park View Hospital, Max Hospital & diagnosis, Imperial Hospital LTD., Evercare Hospital Ltd., National Hospital and Mount Hospital Ltd.

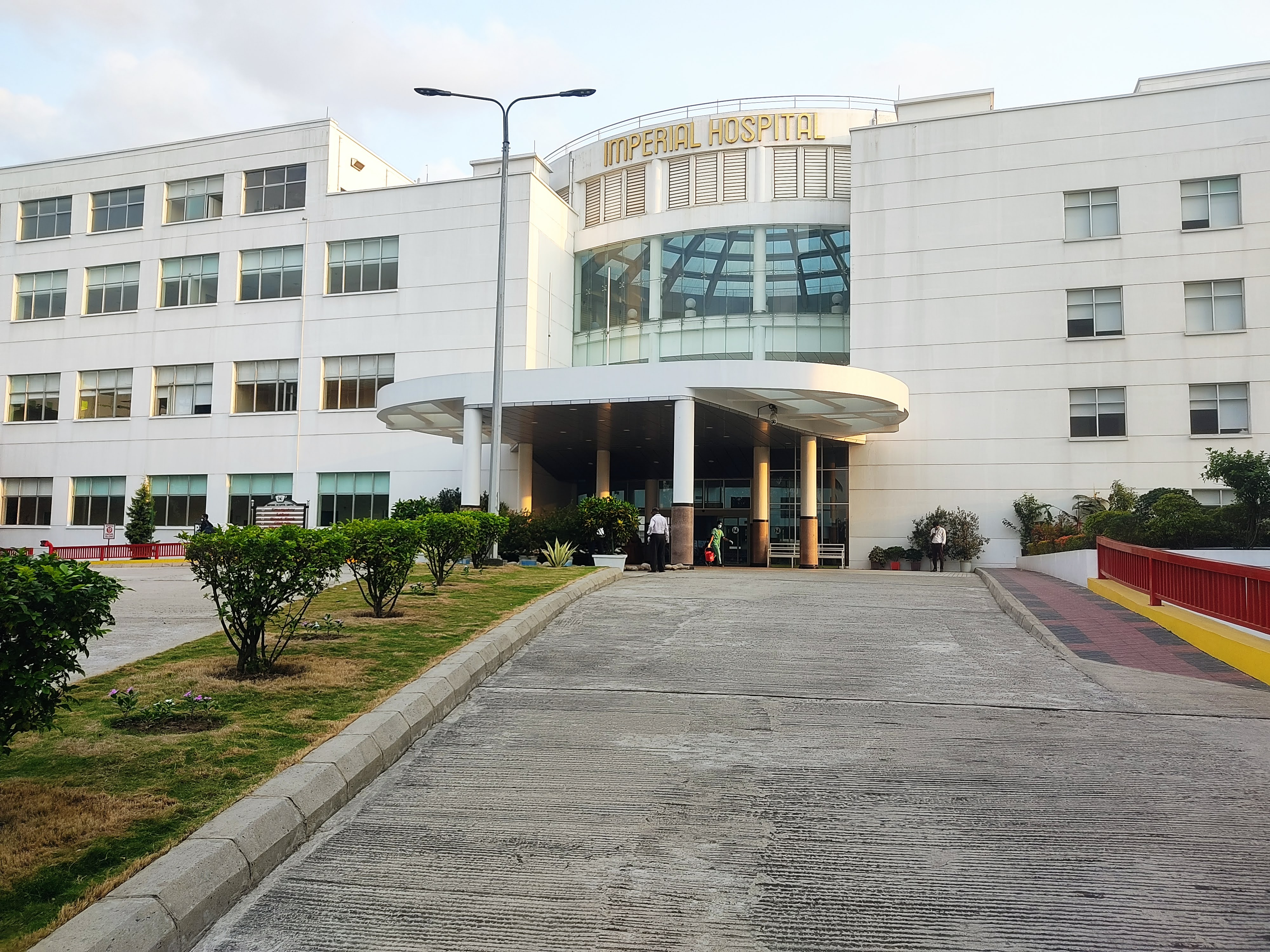
Imperial Hospital Limited is one of many private hospitals in the city

Private Medical Colleges:

- University of Science & Technology Chittagong
- BGC TRUST Medical College Chittagong
- Chittagong Ma o Shishu Hospital
- Southern Medical College
- Marine City Medical College
- Army Medical College
- Poly Clinic
- CSCR Hospital

== Transport ==
Transport in Chittagong is similar to that of the capital, Dhaka. large avenues and roads are present throughout the metropolis. There are various bus systems and taxi services, as well as smaller 'baby' or 'CNG' taxis, which are tricycle-structured motor vehicles. Foreign and local ridesharing companies like Uber and Pathao are operating in the city. There are also traditional manual rickshaws, which are very common.

=== Road ===
In the 2010s, the Chittagong Development Authority (CDA) undertook construction of numerous flyovers and road improvements aimed at easing the traffic congestion in Chittagong. The largest of these projects is the Chittagong Outer Ring Road, which runs along the coast for 15.7 kilometres (9.8 mi) from Patenga to Sagorika Industrial Area. The four-lane ring road is meant to ease gridlock in Chittagong city, and the 33-foot (10 m) embankment on which it is built is intended to protect coastal areas from natural disasters. When the project was approved in 2011, it was expected to be finished in 2014. Construction didn't start until 2015, and is ongoing as of 2025. The original cost estimate has risen almost fourfold, to Tk 33.24 billion ($275M as of 2025). The authority also began the construction of a 9.3 kilometres (5.8 mi) underwater expressway tunnel through the Karnaphuli river to ensure better connectivity between the northern and southern parts of Chittagong. This tunnel will be the first of its kind in South Asia.

The N1 (Dhaka-Chittagong Highway), a major arterial national highway, is the only way to access the city by motor vehicle from most other parts of the country. It is considered a crowded and dangerous highway. This highway is also part of AH41 route of the Asian Highway Network. It has been upgraded to four lanes. The N106 (Chittagong-Rangamati Highway) is another major national highway that connects the Chittagong Hill Tracts with the Oxygen Square.

=== Rail ===
Chittagong can also be accessed by rail. It has a station on the metre gauge, the eastern section of the Bangladesh Railway, whose headquarters are also located within the city. There are two main railway stations, on Station Road and in the Pahartali Thana. Trains to Dhaka, Sylhet, Comilla, and Bhairab are available from Chittagong. The Chittagong Circular Railway was introduced in 2013 to ease traffic congestion and to ensure better public transport service for commuters within the city. The railway includes high-speed DEMU trains with a carrying capacity of 300 passengers. These DEMU trains also travel on the Chittagong-Laksham route which connects the city with Comilla.

=== Air ===
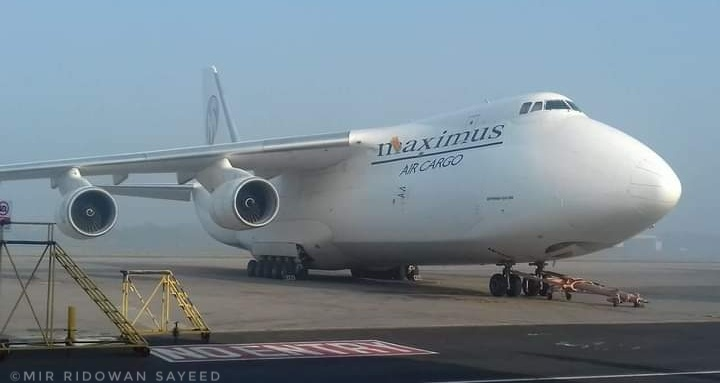
An Antonov An 124 parked in Shah Amanat International Airport

The Shah Amanat International Airport (IATA: CGP, ICAO: VGEG), located at South Patenga, serves as Chittagong's only airport. It is the second busiest airport in Bangladesh. The airport is capable of annually handling 1.5 million passengers and 6,000 tonnes of cargo. Known as Chittagong Airfield during World War II, the airport was used as a supply point by the United States Army Air Forces' Tenth Air Force during the Burma Campaign 1944–45. It officially became a Bangladeshi airport in 1972 after Bangladesh's liberation war. International services fly to major cities of the Arabian Peninsula as well as to Indian city of Kolkata. At present, Middle Eastern airlines like Air Arabia, Flydubai, Jazeera Airways, Oman Air and SalamAir operate flights from the city to these destinations along with airlines of Bangladesh. All Bangladeshi airlines operate regular domestic flights to Dhaka. The airport was formerly known as MA Hannan International Airport but was renamed after a famous Sufi saint Shah Amanat on 2 April 2005 by the Government.

== Sports ==
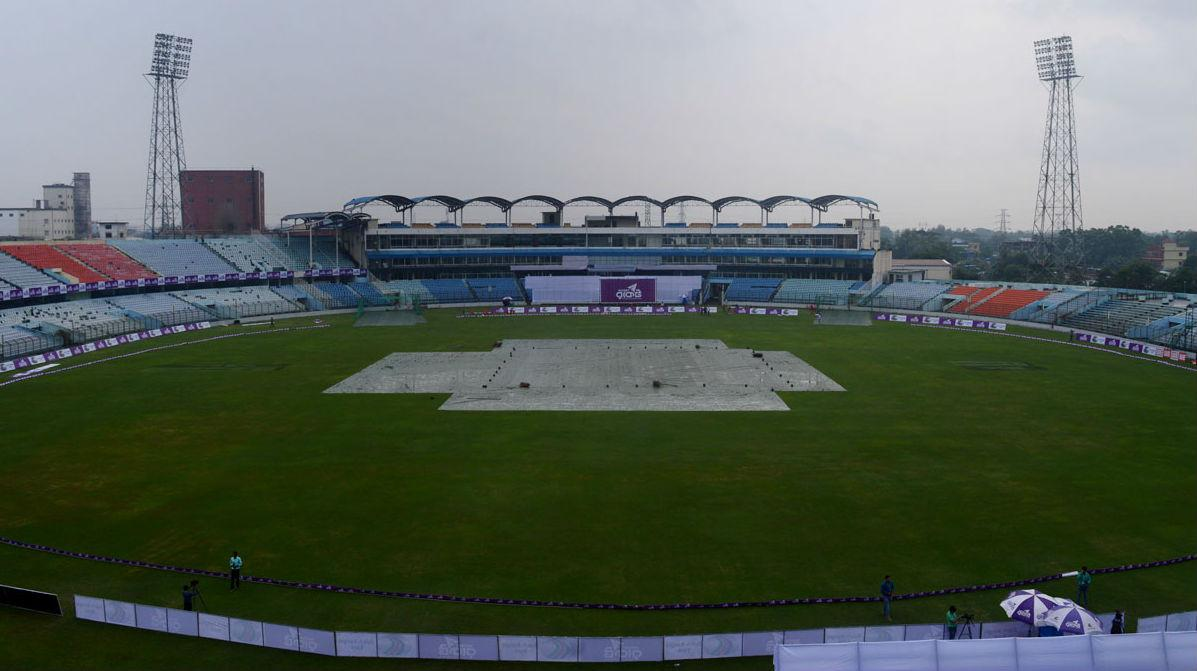
Zohur Ahmed Chowdhury Stadium

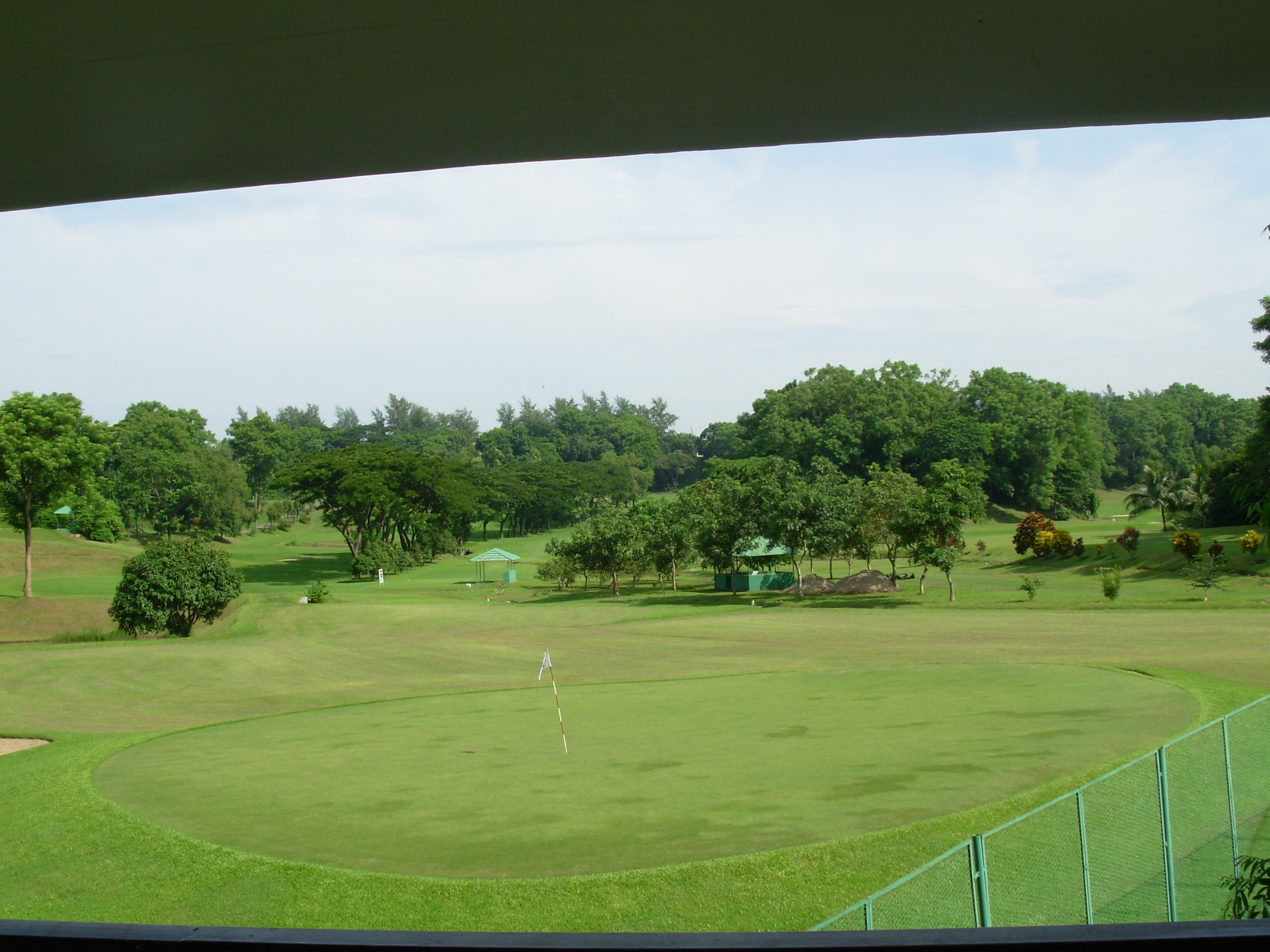
A golf course in Chittagong

Chittagong has produced numerous cricketers, footballers, and athletes, who have performed at the national level. Tamim Iqbal, Akram Khan, Minhajul Abedin, Aftab Ahmed, Nafees Iqbal, Nazimuddin, Faisal Hossain, Tareq Aziz, Mominul Haque, Nayeem Hasan, Mamunul Islam, Ashish Bhadra, Shahidul Alam Sohel are some of the most prominent figures among them. Cricket is the most popular sport in Chittagong, while football, tennis and kabaddi are also popular. Several stadiums are located in Chittagong with the main one being the multipurpose MA Aziz Stadium, which has a seating capacity of 20,000 and hosts football matches in addition to cricket. MA Aziz Stadium was the stadium where Bangladesh achieved its first-ever Test cricket victory, against Zimbabwe in 2005. The stadium now focuses only on football, and is currently the main football venue of the city. Zohur Ahmed Chowdhury Stadium, is currently the main cricket venue of the city, which was awarded Test status in 2006, hosting both domestic and international cricket matches. The city hosted two group matches of the 2011 ICC Cricket World Cup, both taking place in Zohur Ahmed Chowdhury Stadium. It also co-hosted 2014 ICC World Twenty20 along with Dhaka and Sylhet, Zohur Ahmed Chowdhury Stadium hosted 15 group stage matches. Other stadiums in Chittagong include the Women's Complex Ground. Major sporting clubs such as, Mohammedan Sporting Club and Abahani Chittagong are also located in the city. Chittagong is also home to the Bangladesh Premier League franchise, the Chattogram Challengers.

=== Teams ===
- Chattogram Challengers – BPL (Cricket)
- Chittagong Abahani Limited – BPL (Football)
- Acme Chattogram – HCT (Field hockey)

== Notable residents ==
- Zamor, French revolutionary from Bengal, born in Chittagong.
- Charles John Stanley Gough, senior British Indian Army officer and a recipient of the Victoria Cross
- Dawlat Wazir Bahram Khan, was a 16th-century medieval Bengali poet and the Wazir of Chittagong in southeastern Bengal.
- Adolph Medlycott, first Bishop of the Catholic Apostolic Vicariate of Thrissur
- Kalpana Datta, Indian independence movement activist and a member of the armed independence movement led by Surya Sen, which carried out the Chittagong armoury raid in 1930.
- Ahmad Ullah Maizbhandari, Bengali Sufi saint and founder of the Maizbhandari Sufi order in Bengal.
- Nabinchandra Sen, Bengali poet and writer
- Ayub Bachchu, rock guitarist, composer, singer and songwriter, who was the founder of the Bangladeshi rock band Love Runs Blind.
- Partha Barua, singer, musician, composer and actor
- Purnima, film actress
- Rafah Nanjeba Torsa, actress, tv host and beauty pageant titleholder who was crowned Miss World Bangladesh 2019.
- Shefali Ghosh, singer, songwriter
- Muhammad Yunus, Economist, entrepreneur, fifth chief adviser of Bangladesh
- Monica Yunus, singer, operatic soprano
- Bibi Russell, fashion designer and former international model
- Shimul Khaled, fashion designer
- Delwar Jahan Jhantu, film director, producer, lyricist, composer, screenwriter, story-writer, Film editor, cinematographer, music director and a freedom fighter.
- Shantanu Biswas, dramatist, playwright, stage director, singer-songwriter and composer.
- Khaled Belal, storyteller and journalist and former deputy chief information officer at the Press Information Department (PID).
- Mehazabien Chowdhury, actress, model and the winner of Lux Channel I Superstar 2009
- Aly Zaker, actor, businessman, director and writer
- Imtu Ratish, model, anchor, and actor
- Mahbubul Alam, writer, journalist, historian, soldier, and civil servant
- Mohammad Khaled, politician, academic and journalist who was a member of parliament for the Chittagong-6 constituency.
- MA Malek, journalist, editor of Dainik Azadi.
- Syed Waliullah, novelist, short-story writer and playwright
- Ashfaque Nipun, filmmaker, screenwriter and actor
- Niaz Ahmed Khan, academic, researcher, and development practitioner who is the 30th vice-chancellor of the University of Dhaka (DU).
- Tofail Ahmed, academic, chairman of the Local Government Reform Commission
- Irfan Sajjad, model and actor
- Nusrat Faria Mazhar, film actress, model, singer, television presenter and radio jockey
- George Macwa, former Kolkata Mohammedan footballer
- Fakrul Islam Kamal, Bangladeshi former international footballer
- Mamunul Islam, Bangladeshi former international footballer
- Tamim Iqbal, Bangladeshi former international cricketer and commentator
- Nafees Iqbal, former Bangladeshi international cricketer
- Akram Khan, former Bangladeshi cricketer
- Shakil Khan, film actor
- Kabori Sarwar, film actress and politician
- Mirza Ahmad Ispahani, Perso-Bengali businessman based in Chittagong and the patriarch of the Ispahani family.
- Mirza Mehdy Ispahani, Chairman of M.M. Ispahani from 1949 until 2004
- Salahuddin Quader Chowdhury, politician, minister and six-term member of Jatiya Sangsad and member of the Bangladesh Nationalist Party (BNP)
- Giasuddin Quader Chowdhury, politician and a former Jatiya Sangsad member from Chittagong-6 and Chittagong-7 constituencies.
- Fazlul Qadir Chaudhry, politician who served as the 5th speaker of the National Assembly of Pakistan from East Pakistan
- A. B. M. Fazle Karim Chowdhury, politician and a former Jatiya Sangsad member representing the Chittagong-6 constituency
- AKM Fazlul Kabir Chowdhury, politician and well renowned businessman
- Abul Fazal, writer and academic
- Amir Khasru Mahmud Chowdhury, standing committee member of Bangladesh Nationalist Party, and former minister of commerce
- Shah Newaz Chowdhury, politician, industrialist, and a former member of parliament for Chittagong-11
- Sirajul Islam Chowdhury, former student activist, social worker, and a former member of parliament for Chittagong-11
- Ahmed Akbar Sobhan, founder of Bashundhara Group, which operates in the real estate, cement manufacturing, paper, and media sectors

== Sister cities ==
- Goiânia, Brazil
- Kunming, China

== See also ==
- Jamboree Park
- DC Hill
- Districts of Bangladesh
- List of colleges in Sylhet
- List of people from Sylhet
- Divisions of Bangladesh
- Upazila
- Thana
