= Educational Institutions in Chittagong =

Chittagong, commercial capital of Bangladesh, is one of the large educational hubs in Bangladesh. There are many notable institutions.

== University ==
=== Public ===
Name	Established	Location	Link	Ref
University of Chittagong	1966	Hathazari Upazila	link	
Chittagong Medical University	2016	Sitakunda Upazila	link	
Chittagong University of Engineering & Technology	1968	Raozan Upazila	link	
Chittagong Veterinary and Animal Sciences University	1995	Khulshi Thana	link	

=== Private ===
Name	Established	Location	Website	Ref.
University of Science and Technology Chittagong	1989	Khulshi Thana	link	
International Islamic University Chittagong	1995	Sitakunda Upazila	link	
BGC Trust University Bangladesh	2001	Chandanaish Upazila	link	
Southern University, Bangladesh	2002	Bayezid Bostami Thana	link	
Premier University	2002	Panchlaish Thana	link	
East Delta University	2006	Khulshi Thana	link	
Asian University for Women	2008	Panchlaish Thana	link	
Chittagong Independent University	2013	Kotwali Thana	link	
Port City International University	2013	Khulshi Thana	link	
University of Creative Technology Chittagong	2015	Chandgaon Thana	link	
Chattogram BGMEA University of Fashion and Technology	2022	Khulshi Thana	link	

== Medical College ==
=== Public ===
Name	Established	Location	Website	Ref.
Chittagong Medical College	1957	Panchlaish Thana	link	

=== Private ===
Name	Established	Location	Website	Ref.
Institute of Applied Health Sciences	1989	Khulshi Thana	link	
BGC Trust Medical College	2002	Chandanaish Upazila	link	
Chattogram Maa-O-Shishu Hospital Medical College	2005	Double Mooring Thana	link	
Southern Medical College	2006	Khulshi Thana	link	
Chattagram International Medical College	2013	Chandgaon Thana	link	
Marine City Medical College	2013	Bayazid Thana	link	

=== Armed Forces ===
Name	Established	Location	Website	Ref.
Army Medical College, Chattogram	2015	Chattogram Cantonment	link	
Navy Medical College, Chattogram	2024	BNS Issa Khan	link	

== College ==
=== Government ===
Name	Established	Location	Website	Ref.
Chittagong College	1869	Chawkbazar Thana	link	
Government Hazi Mohammad Mohsin College, Chittagong	1874	Chawkbazar Thana	link	
Government City College, Chattogram	1954	Sadarghat Thana	link	
Government College of Commerce, Chittagong	1947	Sadarghat Thana	link	
Chittagong Government Women's College	1957	Khulshi Thana	link	
Bakalia Government College	1966	Bakolia Thana	link	
Chittagong Government Model School and College	2007	Khulshi Thana	link	
Chattogram Collegiate School	1836/2008	Sadarghat Thana	link	
Satkania Government College	1949	Satkania Upazila	link	
Patiya Government College	1962	Patiya Upazila	link	
Rangunia Government College	1963	Rangunia Upazila	link	
Raozan Government College	1963	Raozan Upazila	link	
Nizampur Government College	1964	Mirsarai Upazila	link	
Hathazari Government College	1968	Hathazari Upazila	link	
Chunati Government Women's College	1989	Lohagara Upazila, Chittagong		

=== Private ===
Name	Established	Location	Website
Chittagong Cantonment Public College	1961	Panchlaish Thana	link
Ispahani Public School & College	1979	Panchlaish Thana	link
Bangladesh Noubahini School and College, Chattogram	1977	Bandar Thana	link
BAF Shaheen College Chattogram	1978	Patenga Thana	link
Bangladesh Mahila Samiti Girls' High School & College	1962	Kotwali Thana, Chittagong	link
Hazera Taju Degree College	1991	Chandgaon Thana	link
Agrabad Mohila College	1988	Double Mooring Thana	link
Saint Placid's School and College	1993	Kotwali Thana, Chittagong	link
Kazem Ali School and College	1885	Chawkbazar Thana	link
Aparnacharan City Corporation Girls' High School and College	1927	Kotwali Thana	
Sunshine Grammar School and College	1985	Panchlaish Thana	link
Uttar Kattoli Alhaz Mostafa Hakim University College	1994	Akbarshah Thana	link
Chittagong City Corporation Municipal Model School and College	1880	Kotwali Thana, Chittagong	link
Chittagong Urea Fertilizer School and College	1988	Anwara Upazila	link
Mirzakhil High School and College	1964	Satkania Upazila	link
Nazirhat College	1949	Hathazari Upazila	
Sitakund Degree College	1968	Sitakunda Upazila	link
Bara Aulia Degree College	1980	Lohagara Upazila, Chittagong	
Professor Kamal Uddin Chowdhury College	2000	Mirsarai Upazila	link
Gohira Degree College	1968	Raozan Upazila	link

== Specialist Institute ==
=== Government ===
Name	Established	Location	Ref.
Chittagong Nursing College	2007	Panchlaish Thana	
Chittagong Pali College	1939	Kotwali Thana	
Government Teachers' Training College, Chittagong	1958	Bakolia Thana	
Government Art College, Chittagong	1973	Panchlaish Thana	
Textile Engineering College, Chittagong	1980	Mirsarai Upazila	
Chittagong Polytechnic Institute	1962	Panchlaish Thana	

== Military Institute ==
Name	Established	Location	Ref.
Bangladesh Marine Academy	1962	Bandar Thana	
Bangladesh Marine Fisheries Academy	1973	Karnaphuli Upazila	
Bangladesh Military Academy	1974	Sitakunda Upazila	
Bangladesh Naval Academy	1976	Patenga Thana	

== High School ==
=== Government ===
Name	Established	Location	Website
Chattogram Collegiate School	1836	Sadarghat Thana	link
Dr. Khastagir Government Girls' High School	1887	Chawkbazar Thana	link
Hazi Mohammad Mohsin Government High School	1874	Chawkbazar Thana	link
Government Muslim High School	1909	Kotwali Thana, Chittagong	link
Chittagong Government High School	1906	Chawkbazar Thana	link
Nasirabad Government High School	1967	Panchlaish Thana	link
Bakalia Government High School	1967	Bakolia Thana	link
Chittagong Government Model School and College	2007	Panchlaish Thana	link
Raozan R.R.A.C Model Government High School	1898	Raozan Upazila	
Kargil Government High School	1902	Sandwip Upazila	
Sitakund Government Model High School	1913	Sitakunda Upazila	

=== Private ===
Name	Established	Location
Ispahani Public School & College	1979	Panchlaish Thana
Bangladesh Noubahini School and College, Chattogram	1977	Bandar Thana
Bangladesh Mahila Samiti Girls' High School & College	1962	Kotwali Thana, Chittagong
Saint Placid's School and College	1993	Kotwali Thana, Chittagong
Kazem Ali School and College	1885	Chawkbazar Thana
Chittagong City Corporation Municipal Model School and College	1880	Kotwali Thana, Chittagong
Aparnacharan City Corporation Girls' High School and College	1927	Kotwali Thana, Chittagong
Chittagong Ideal High School	1998	Chawkbazar Thana
Khawja Ajmeri High School	1974	Double Mooring Thana
Chittagong Grammar School	1992	Double Mooring Thana
Chittagong Steel Mills High School	1972	Patenga Thana
CIDER International School	1997	Bayezid Bostami Thana
Sunshine Grammar School and College	1985	Panchlaish Thana
Bauria Golam Khalek Academy	1947	Sandwip Upazila
Faujdarhat Collegiate School	1992	Sitakunda Upazila
Faujdarhat K. M. High School	1956	Sitakunda Upazila
Gachua Adarsha High School	1987	Sandwip Upazila
Natmura Pukuria High School	1957	Banshkhali Upazila
Pomara High School	1928	Rangunia Upazila
Sarkarhat N. R. High School	1939	Mirsharai Upazila
Swapnanagar Bidyaniketan	2004	Patiya Upazila
Mirza Ahmed Ispahani High School	1987	Chandgaon Thana
Mirzakhil High School and College	1964	Satkania Upazila
Bainnachola-Manikpur High School	2018	Fatikchhari Upazila
Chittagong Urea Fertilizer School and College	1988	Anwara Upazila
Patiya Adarsha High School	1845	Patiya Upazila
Rangunia Khilmogal Rashik High School	1926	Rangunia Upazila

== Madrasa ==
=== Alia ===
Madrasa	Established	Location
Jamia Ahmadiyya Sunnia Kamil Madrasa	1954	Panchlaish Thana
Baitush Sharaf Adarsha Kamil Madrasah	1982	Double Mooring Thana
Shahchand Auliya Kamil Madrasa	1928	Patiya Upazila
Barakhain Jameya Jamhuria Fazil Madrasah	1974	Anwara Upazila

=== Qawmi ===
Madrasa	Established	Location
Darul Uloom Hathazari	1901	Hathazari Upazila
Al-Jamiatul Islamiah Azizul Uloom Babunagar	1924	Fatikchhari Upazila
Al Jamia Al Islamia Patiya	1938	Patiya Upazila
Jamia Islamia Obaidia Nanupur	1958	Fatikchhari Upazila
Al-Jamiatul Arabia Haildhar Madrasa	1972	Anowara Upazila
Jamiatul Uloom Al-Islamia Lalkhan Bazar	1981	Khulshi Thana
Darul Ma'arif Al-Islamia	1985	Chandgaon Thana
