= Neighbourhoods in the Chittagong metropolitan area =

Coordinates: 22°20′06″N 91°49′57″E

Chittagong (Bengali: চিটাগং, /tʃɪtəɡɒŋ/; Burmese: စစ်တကောင်း), officially Chattogram ( Bengali: চট্টগ্রাম), also known as the Port City of Bangladesh is a major coastal city and financial centre in southeastern Bangladesh. The city had a population of more than 8.6 million in 2017, making it the second-largest city in the country. It is the capital and administrative seat of an eponymous District and Division. The city is located on the banks of the Karnaphuli River between the Chittagong Hill Tracts and the Bay of Bengal. Modern Chittagong is Bangladesh's second most significant urban center after Dhaka.

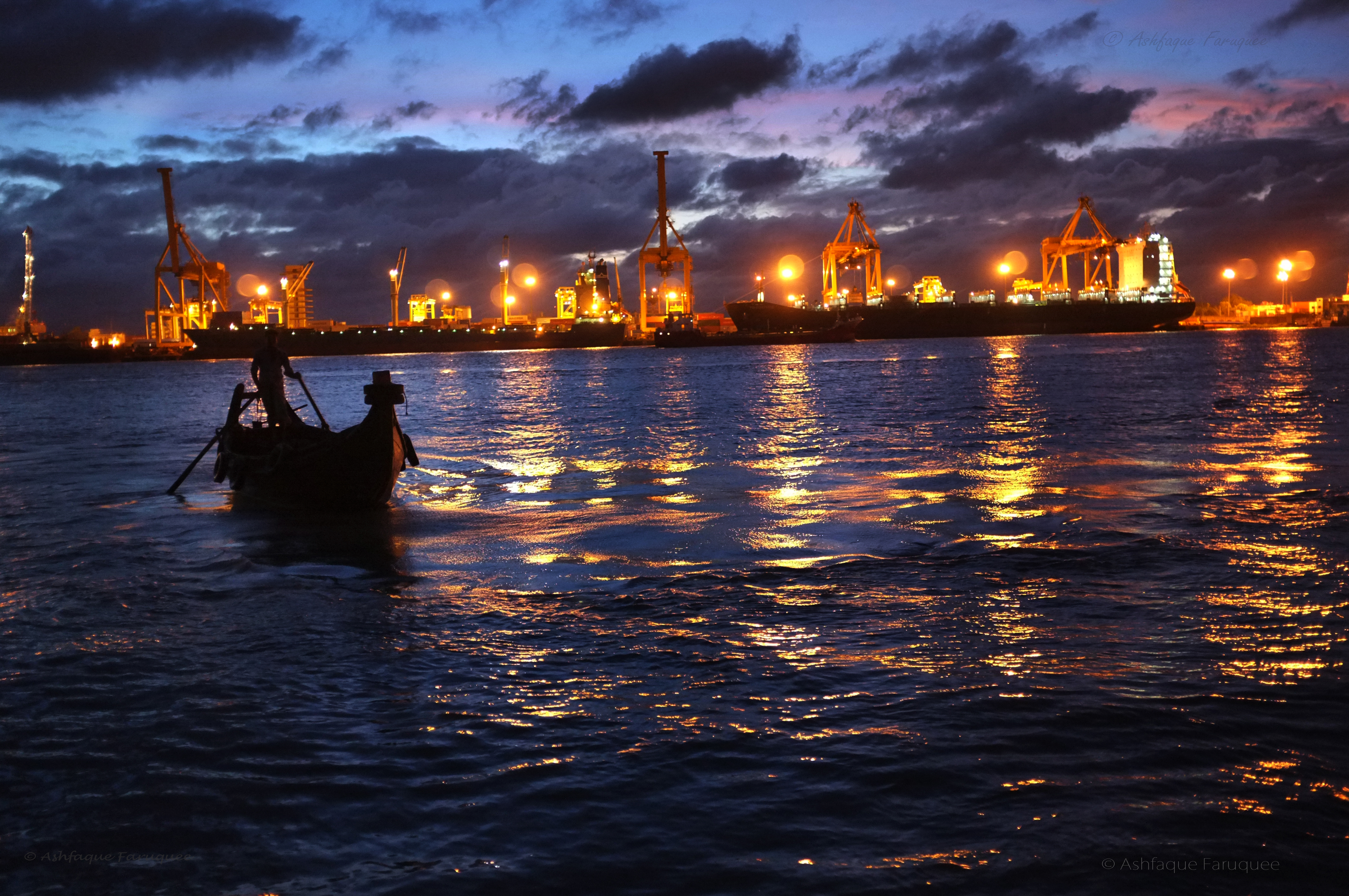
Chittagong Port

The major municipal areas which are a part of the Chittagong Metropolitan Area are:

- Agrabad
- Bhatiari
- Chandgoan residential area
- Faujdarhat
- Halishahar
- Patenga
- North Kattali
- South Kattali
- Pahartali
- Saraipara
- Noapara
- Akbarshah
- Bayazid
- Bakalia
- Panchlaish
- Chawkbazar
- Jamal Khan
- Mohra
- Khatunganj
- Patharghata
- Bakshirhat
- Sanowara Residential Area
- Hamid Char
- Annona Residential Area
- Burishchar
- Nandan Kanan
- Lalkhan Bazar
- Dampara
- Khulshi
- Khulshi Residential Area
- Sholoshahar
- Nasirabad
- Ali Nagar
- Mohammadnagar
- Muradnagar
- Shahidnagar
- Wazedia
- Shershah Colony
- Debar Par
- Arefin Nagar
- Chandranagar
- Burma Colony
- Jhautala
- Rampur
- Sobujbag
- Shamoly Residential Area
- Shantibag Residential Area
- Gosaildanga
- Bansalapara
- Firinghee Bazar
- Ichanagar
- Sadarghat
- Fateabad
- Shahi Colony
- Hathazari

== See also ==
- Neighbourhoods in the Dhaka metropolitan area
