= History of education in Chittagong =

Chittagong is the second largest city in Bangladesh. Greater Chittagong refers to the Chittagong District, Cox's Bazar District, Rangamati District, Khagrachari District and Bandarban District. The city has a brief history of education.

When the decline of Nalanda University began in the sixth century, Pandit Vihara was established in Chittagong in the tenth century. Where Buddhist scholars such as Luipada, Sabripa, Ladpa, Avadhutpa etc. used to study.

Persian was the official language of Chittagong till 1838. After learning Arabic, Muslims and wealthy Hindus learned Persian. But spread of Bengali among Muslims was less. Religious education was common among Muslims. Muslim students used to learn Arabic from the teacher Maulana or Muezzin. Muazzins were known as miazi, mizzi. Their school was called Mizzi Daras. During the Mughal Empire period, Muslim teachers were allotted free land. Muslim girls did not go to school and ended their education with primary education. Upper caste Hindus received education. But lower caste Hindus did not receive education.

== Educational Institution ==
=== List of educational institutions based on establishment date ===
Name	Founding period	Current status
Ramgati Dhar School	1835	Raozan R.R.A.C Model Government High School
Chittagong Zilla School	1836	Chittagong Collegiate School
St. Placid's School	1853	St. Placid's School and College
Government First Arts College	1869	Chittagong College
Queens High School	1871	defunct
Albert High School	1871	Chittagong City Corporation Municipal Model School and College
Chittagong Madrasah	1874	Government Muslim High School, Government Hazi Mohammad Mohsin College and Hazi Mohammad Mohsin Government High School
Hazari Middle English School	1885	defunct
Chittagong Middle English School	1885	Kazem Ali School and College
Chittagong High English School	1888	defunct
National High School (founded by Harish Chandra)		defunct
Sitakunda Kamil Madrasa	1886	Sitakunda Kamil MA Madrasah
Dr. Khastgir Girls High School	1887	Dr. Khastagir Government Girls' High School
Umatara High School		defunct
Graduate High School		defunct
Oriental Academy		defunct
Victoria Technical Institute		defunct
Chittagong Training School		defunct
JM Sen High School	1913	JM Sen School and College
Chittagong Medical School	1927	defunct
Chittagong Normal School	1958	Government Teacher's Training College, Chittagong
Government Intermediate College, Chittagong	1967	defunct
