= Pahartali Thana =

Thana in Chattogram Division, Bangladesh

Pahartali পাহাড়তলী
- Thana
- Location in Bangladesh
- Coordinates: 22°22′N 91°46.5′E
- Country: Bangladesh
- Division: Chittagong Division
- District: Chittagong District
- Metropolis: Chittagong
- Jatiya Sangsad constituency: Chittagong-10
- Formed: 1978; 48 years ago

Government
  - Type: Metropolitan Police
  - Body: Chattogram Metropolitan Police
  - Officer in Charge: Md. Babul Azad

Area
  - Total: 8.44 km^{2} (3.26 sq mi)
- Elevation: 15 m (49 ft)

Population (2022)
  - Total: 190,030
  - Density: 4,266/km^{2} (11,050/sq mi)
- Time zone: UTC+6 (BST)
- Postal code: 4202
- Area code: 031
- Website: bangladesh.gov.bd/maps/images/chittagong/PahartaliT.gif

Pahartali (Bengali: পাহাড়তলী) is a thana of Chattogram District in Chattogram Division, Bangladesh.

== Geography ==
Pahartali is located at 22.3667°N 91.7750°E. It has a total area 8.44 km^{2}. It is bounded by Sitakunda Upazila on the north, Halishahar and Double Mooring thanas on the south, Khulshi Thana on the east, and the Bay of Bengal on the west.

== Demographics ==
Religions in Pahartali Thana (2022)
Religion	Percent
Islam	86.52%
Hinduism	13.07%
Other or not stated	0.41%

According to the 2022 Bangladeshi census, Pahartali Thana had 47,759 households and a population of 190,030. 8.31% of the population were under 5 years of age. Pahartali had a literacy rate (age 7 and over) of 81.95%: 83.59% for males and 80.22% for females, and a sex ratio of 105.38 males for every 100 females.

At the 1991 Bangladesh census, Pahartali had a population of 198,894, of whom 109,571 were aged 18 or older. Males constituted 57.45% of the population, and females 42.55%. Pahartali had an average literacy rate of 54% (7+ years), against the national average of 32.4%.

== See also ==
- Upazilas of Bangladesh
- Districts of Bangladesh
- Divisions of Bangladesh
