= Chattogram BGMEA University of Fashion and Technology =

University in Bangladesh

Chattogram BGMEA University of Fashion & Technology
- চট্টগ্রাম বিজিএমইএ ইউনিভার্সিটি অব ফ্যাশন অ্যান্ড টেকনোলজি
- Other name: CBUFT
- Former names: Chattogram BGMEA Institute of Fashion & Technology-CBIFT
- Motto: Creating Skills for Better Tomorrow
- Type: Private research
- Established: 24 August 2022; 3 years ago
- Founder: Nasir Uddin Chowdhury
- Parent institution: Bangladesh Garment Manufacturers and Exporters Association
- Accreditation: Institution of Textile Engineers and Technologists
- Affiliations: University Grants Commission (UGC)
- Chairman: Nasir Uddin Chowdhury
- Chancellor: President Mohammed Shahabuddin
- Vice-Chancellor: Mohammed Obaidul Karim
- Academic staff: 30
- Administrative staff: 10
- Location: BGMEA Bhaban, 669/E, Jhautala Road, South Khulshi, Chattogram, Bangladesh; 22.3609°N 91.8075°E
- Campus: 3.7 acres (1.5 ha); Urban
- Language: English, Bangla
- Website: cbuft.edu.bd

Chattogram BGMEA University of Fashion and Technology (Bengali: চট্টগ্রাম বিসিএমইএ ইউনিভার্সিটি অফ ফ্যাশন অ্যান্ড টেকনোলজি), commonly known as CBUFT, is a private university located in South Khulshi, Chattogram, Bangladesh. Established under the Private Universities Act 2010, the university is committed to providing quality higher education and promoting research and innovation in fashion and textiles. It was founded with the vision of becoming a center of academic excellence in Bangladesh’s southeastern region, especially serving the needs of the country’s vibrant garment and textile industries.

== History ==
The Department of Secondary and Higher Education of the Ministry of Education of the Government of Bangladesh granted provisional approval for the temporary establishment and operation of the university on 24 August 2022. It started its Journey as a university under the University Grants Commission on 21 January 2023.

== Location ==
CBUFT is located at the BGMEA Building, Jhautola Road, South Khulsi, Chattogram, Bangladesh.

== Rankings ==
Chattogram BGMEA University of Fashion and Technology (CBUFT) has been featured in various global and national ranking systems:

- uniRank (as of 2025): Ranked 144th in Bangladesh and 13,356th in the world.

== Faculties ==
Chattogram BGMEA University of Fashion and Technology has three faculties. They are:

1. The Faculty of Clothing & Fashion Technology (FCFT),
  - Dept. of Textile and Clothing Technology (TCT)
  - Dept. of Fashion Design Technology (FDT)
2. Faculty of Textile Manufacturing & Engineering (FTME),
  - Dept. of Textile Engineering
  - Dept. of Textile Engineering and Management
3. Faculty of Fashion and Apparel Design (FFAD)
  - Dept. of Apparel Merchandising and Management
  - Dept. of Fashion Design

== Academics ==
The university offers several undergraduate and postgraduate degrees:

=== Undergraduate program ===
- B.Sc. in Textile and Clothing Technology (TCT)
- B.Sc. in Fashion Design and Technology (FDT)
- Bachelor of Fashion Design (FD)
- Bachelor of Apparel Merchandising and Management (AMM)

=== Graduate program ===
- MBA in Apparel Merchandising

== Admission Criteria ==
The admission eligibility for enrolling requires have minimum 2.50 GPA in SSC/HSC (Vocational)/Dakhil and HSC/Alim (including additional subjects). The minimum GPA is 2.00 in SSC and HSC equivalent. The total must not be lower than 6.00. Science is mandatory for the Dept. of Textile and Clothing Technology (TCT) and the Dept. of Fashion Design Technology (FDT), and any background for Dept. of Apparel Merchandising and Management and the Dept of Fashion Design. GED is not acceptable. Candidates who have completed 12 years of schooling from a reputed educational institution in foreign countries can also apply with the approval of the admission office of CBUFT.

=== Scholarship and Financial ===
- Merit-based scholarship,
- Semester-based results,
- Supporting ethnic groups,
- Siblings,
- BGMEA members’ sons and daughters
- The Freedom Fighters’ Ward.

== See also ==
- Bangladesh University of Textiles
- University of Chittagong
- BGMEA University of Fashion and Technology
- Textile Engineering College, Chittagong
- Port City International University
