= Sarkarhat N. R. High School =

Sarkarhat Najar Ali Rupjan High School

Location
- Nizampur, Mirsharai, Chittagong District; Bangladesh
- Coordinates: 22.7208°N 91.6027°E

Information
- Type: Secondary school
- Established: 1 October 1939

Sarkarhat N. R. High School is a secondary school in Nizampur, Mirsharai Upazila, Chittagong District, Bangladesh. Its full name is Sarkarhat Najar Ali Rupjan High School.
