= Government Teachers' Training College, Chittagong =

Coordinates: 22.3569°N 91.8449°E

- সরকারি টিচার্স ট্রেনিং কলেজ, চট্টগ্রাম
- Former name: Chittagong Normal School
- Motto: O Lord, grant me knowledge
- Type: Public
- Established: 1958; 68 years ago
- Affiliations: National University (Bangladesh) (College Code: 4378)
- Principal: Professor Dilruba Akter Chowdhury
- Location: K.B. Aman Ali Road, Bakalia, Chattogram, 4203, Bangladesh
- Campus: 4.61 acres
- EIIN: 133624
- Website: ttc.chittagong.gov.bd

The Government Teachers' Training College is a public professional teacher education institution located in Chittagong, Bangladesh. It was established in 1958 and introduced the B.Ed. program in 1977.

== History ==
The institution was founded in 1958 as the Chittagong Normal School on the site of the present Chittagong Government High School. On 1 July of the same year, it was upgraded to a Junior Training College. Subsequently, it was granted permission under the Board of Intermediate and Secondary Education, Cumilla to admit students into the I.Ed. program. On 30 August 1972, the B.A. in Education program was introduced. In 1977, a 10-month B.Ed. program was launched, granting the institution full status as a Teachers' Training College. In 1994, a double shift system was introduced. From July 1996, the M.Ed. program was introduced under the National University (Bangladesh). Every year from July, students would enroll in the 10-month B.Ed. and M.Ed. programs. From the 2006 academic year, the B.Ed. course was extended to one year with major curriculum revisions. Currently, both the B.Ed. and M.Ed. programs are one year long, with new admissions taking place in January each year.

Currently, the B.Ed. (Professional) and M.Ed. (Professional) programs are conducted on a semester basis, each lasting 6 months. The first semester of the B.Ed. (Professional) program includes four compulsory and two elective courses, while the second semester includes two compulsory and one optional course. Each semester also includes a 'teaching practicum' at the school level. Additionally, a B.Ed. (Honours) program is offered under the National University.

== Notable Teachers and Alumni ==
=== Teachers ===
- Anwarul Haque, art teacher and painter.

== Facilities ==
The college has three buildings for administrative and academic activities. It includes one male dormitory, one female dormitory, and one dormitory at the Science Development Center. There is also a residence for the principal. The college owns two microbuses. It has an ICT lab with Wi-Fi facilities and a small library. A small cafeteria serves trainees. CCTV cameras have been installed on campus for security purposes.

== Personnel ==
Currently, the college has 32 faculty members and administrative staff engaged in academic and administrative activities. There are also 23 third and fourth-class employees.
