= Aparnacharan City Corporation Girls' High School and College =

Aparnacharan City Corporation Girls' High School

Location
- Nandankanan, Chittagong; Bangladesh; 22.3367°N 91.8322°E

Information
- Established: 1927
- School district: Chittagong
- Faculty: 31

Aparnacharan City Corporation Girls' High School (Bengali: অপর্ণাচরণ সিটি কর্পোরেশন বালিকা উচ্চ বিদ্যালয়) is a secondary school for girls, located in the Nandankanon neighborhood of Chittagong, Bangladesh. It was established in 1927.

== History ==
The school is named after prominent philanthropist Ray Bahadur Aparnacharan Dey. But behind the establishment of the school, Rajanikanth Biswas and his two friends Kiranchandra Das and anti-British revolutionist Ananta Singh's father Golap Chandra Singh had contributed most. In fact they came forward to build the school at the first place. Granting the request of Rajanikanth Biswas and his two friends, Ray Bahadur Aparnacharan Dey donated that time more than ten thousand rupees to purchase the land for the school. At the beginning of its schooling program, the school started as a middle primary school but the school moved up to 4th, 5th and 10th grades gradually later.

The first female anti-British revolutionist martyr of Chittagong district, Pritilata Waddedar, was appointed as headmistress in the school for some years.

== Notable alumni ==
- Chitralekha Guho, film actress.

== See also ==
- Dr. Khastagir Government Girls' School
- Chittagong Collegiate School and College
- Bakalia Government High School
- Saint Placid's High School
