= Institute of Applied Health Sciences =

Medical college in Chittagong, Bangladesh

- ইন্সটিটিউট অব অ্যাপ্লাইড হেলথ সায়েন্সেস
- Other name: IAHS
- Type: Private medical school
- Established: 1989; 37 years ago
- Academic affiliations: Chittagong Medical University
- Principal: Prof. Dr. Rama Barua
- Students: 480
- Location: Chittagong, Bangladesh
- Campus: Urban
- Language: English
- Website: link

Institute of Applied Health Sciences , abbreviated as IAHS is a medical college located in Khulshi, Chittagong, Bangladesh.It is affiliated with the Chittagong Medical University.

== History ==
Institute of Applied Health Sciences was established in 1989 at Foy's Lake, Khulshi, Chattogram. It got affiliated with Chittagong Medical University in 2017.
