= Chittagong Government Women's College =

Women's college in Chittagong, Bangladesh

- চট্টগ্রাম সরকারি মহিলা কলেজ
- Motto: জ্ঞানই আলো
- Motto in English: Knowledge is Power
- Type: Public
- Established: 1957; 69 years ago
- Affiliations: Board of Intermediate and Secondary Education, Chattogram
- Chairman: Md. Mashiur Rahman
- Principal: Prof. MD. Abul Hasan
- Vice-Principal: Prof. Tahmina Akhter Nur
- Location: Nasirabad, Chittagong, Bangladesh; 22.3626°N 91.8158°E
- Campus: Urban, 21 acres (8.5 ha)
- Language: Bangla & English
- Website: www.cgwc.edu.bd

Chittagong Government Women's College (alternatively Chittagong Govt. Girls' College) is a public college only for women. It is located at Nasirabad in Chittagong. It was established in 1957. It is affiliated with Chittagong Education Board and National University, Bangladesh

== History ==
The purpose of establishing a women's institution was offering education to the women in restrictive families in Bangladesh. Thus some social reformers and educationalists tried to make an institution only for women in Chittagong. Thus they founded Chittagong Government Women's College. Its academic and administrative works started in Victoria Islamic Hostel just beside the Andarkilla Shahi Jame Mosque. In the beginning, it started its activities with only 150 students and 8 teachers. The teachers taught without any salary. The first principal of this institution was Sri Jogesh Chandra Singha. Badsha Mia Chowdhury and some social reformers offered 20 acres land for this institution at Khulshi area in Chittagong. In 1961/1962, the institution moved here from its initial place. It nationalized in 1968. Business studies group started in 2006–2007.

=== Affiliations ===
| Course | Date of First Affiliation |
|---|---|
| HSC | 30.06.1960 |
| Degree(Pass) | 08.02.1971 |
| Honours | 09.06.1987 |
| Masters Preliminary | 28.01.1995 |
| Masters final | 26.06.1997 |

== Administration ==
Current principal of this institution is Md. Abul Hasan. And vice principal is Tahmina Akhter Nur.

== Academics ==
Chittagong Government Women's College offers HSC, Honours courses, and master's degree courses.

=== Honours courses ===
- Bangla
- English
- Islamic History and Culture
- Philosophy
- Political Science
- Sociology
- Social Work
- Economics
- Psychology

=== Master's final courses ===
- Bangla
- Islamic History and Culture
- Philosophy
- Economics

=== Degree (pass) courses ===
- B. A. (Pass)
- B. S. S. (Pass)
- B.Sc. (Pass)
- B. B. S. (Pass)
