= Bangladesh Mahila Samiti Girls' High School & College =

Bangladesh Mahila Samiti Girls' High School & College (Bangladesh Women's Association Girls' High School & College)
- বাংলাদেশ মহিলা সমিতি বালিকা উচ্চ বিদ্যালয় ও কলেজ

Location
- Kotowali, Dampara; Chittagong; Bangladesh
- Coordinates: 22.3536°N 91.8221°E

Information
- Other names: BWA or BaWA, BMS
- School type: Private
- Motto: জ্ঞানই আলো, শিক্ষাই আদর্শ (Knowledge is enlightenment, Education is supreme)
- Established: 1962 (then East Pakistan, pre-independence Bangladesh)
- Sister school: Bangladesh Mahila Samiti Kindergarten School
- School board: Board of Intermediate and Secondary Education, Chattogram (Chittagong Education Board)
- Session: January
- Principal: Mohammad Arif Ul Hasan Chowdhury
- Grades: Playgroup - 12th grade
- Gender: Female
- Enrollment: 6,000
- Education system: National Curriculum of Bangladesh
- Language: Bangla & English
- Campus type: Urban
- Colors: Orange, white (primary); Red (secondary)
- Yearbook: উত্তরণ (Uttaran)
- Website: https://www.bmssc.edu.bd/

Bangladesh Mahila Samiti Girls' High School & College (Bengali: বাংলাদেশ মহিলা সমিতি বালিকা উচ্চ বিদ্যালয় ও কলেজ) is a school for girls, located in Kotwali Thana of Chittagong, Bangladesh. For short it is known as BMS (Bangladesh Mahila Samiti) or BWA (Bangladesh Women's Association) Girls' High School & College. The school was established in 1962 (then East Pakistan, pre-independence Bangladesh). It was formerly known as Bangladesh Women Association Institute and was a coeducational school in its early years.

It has secured top places among all the institutions of the board since its establishment in 1962 and it has also been named as one of the best and most reputable girls' schools in the board. In 2013, it placed third among schools within Chittagong Division in student performance on the Junior School Certificate (JSC) examinations.

== Notable alumni ==
- Wasfia Nazreen, Bangladeshi mountaineer, activist, social worker and writer; first Bangladeshi and first Bengali to complete the Seven Summits
