= Patiya Government College =

Educational institution in South Chittagong

- পটিয়া সরকারি কলেজ
- Former name: Patiya College
- Type: Public
- Established: 1962; 64 years ago
- Academic affiliations: National University
- Principal: Mohammad Mozammel Hoque
- Location: Patiya, Chittagong District, Bangladesh; 22.2923°N 91.9818°E
- Campus: 7.16 acres (2.90 ha); Urban
- Website: patiyagovtcollege.gov.bd

Patiya Government College (Bengali: পটিয়া সরকারি কলেজ) is a public college located in Patiya Upazila of Chittagong District, Bangladesh. It is affiliated to National University, and is the only master's level college in Patiya Upazila.

== History ==
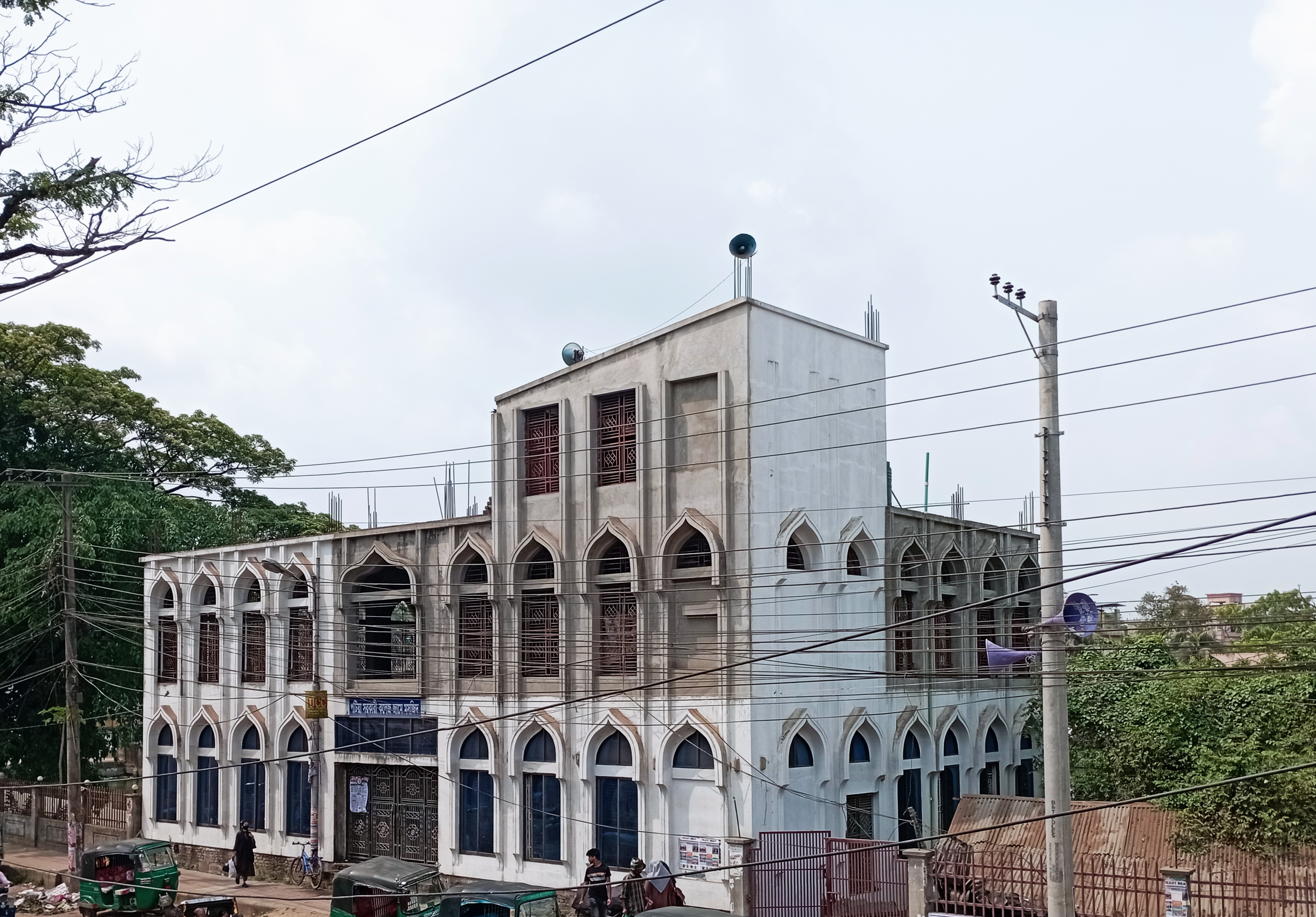
Patiya Government College Jame Mosque

Patiya College was founded in 1962. In 1978, the college received a donation of two and a half acres of land from Patiya Adarsha High School. The college was nationalized in 1980, becoming Patiya Government College. It is affiliated to National University.

Master's degree courses in accountancy and management began in 2017, the first post-graduate courses offered anywhere in southern Chittagong District.
