= Chittagong Ideal High School =

Coordinates: 22.3495°N 91.8347°E

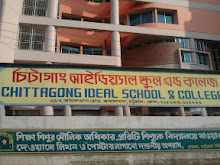
- Front view of Chittagong Ideal School & College

Location
- 24/A Jamal Khan Road; Chittagong; Bangladesh

Information
- Type: Kindergarten and secondary school
- Founded: 1998
- Founder: AK Mahmudul Haque
- School district: Chittagong District
- Chairman: M Khorshed Alam
- Principal: Amena Shaheen
- Headmaster: Shahida Nasrin Shiuly
- Teaching staff: More than 120
- Grades: KG-1 to Class 10
- Enrollment: More than three thousand
- Language: Bengali, British English
- Website: cihs.edu.bd

Chittagong Ideal High School is an educational institution in Chittagong, Bangladesh. It was established on 1998. It is located in Jamal Khan Road in Chittagong.

The school primarily started in a rented 4 storied building and 1 year later it rented another building beside the previous one. Finally the school built their own 10 storied building which was fully equipped with all necessary facilities. In 2012 the school started it Secondary collegsection.

Late AK Mahmudul Haq; renowned teacher and Nationally Awarded Principal, is the founding Chairman of the Chittagong Ideal School and College Trust.

The school is becoming a center of excellence and quality education in the Chittagong City and also nationwide.

== Accreditation ==
The school was accredited by Chittagong Education Board in 2006.

== List of Principal ==
- Amena Shaheen (1998-2009)
- Dr. Muhammad Yusuf (2009-2024)
- Amena Shaheen (2024–Present)

== List of Headmaster ==
- Abu Taher Majumdar (1998-2017)
- Shahida Nasrin Shiuly (2017–Present)

== List of Chairman ==
- AK Mahmudul Haque (1998-2022)
- M Khorshed Alam (2022–Present)
