= Kotwali Thana, Chittagong =

Thana in Chattogram Division, Bangladesh

Kotwali কোতোয়ালী
- Thana
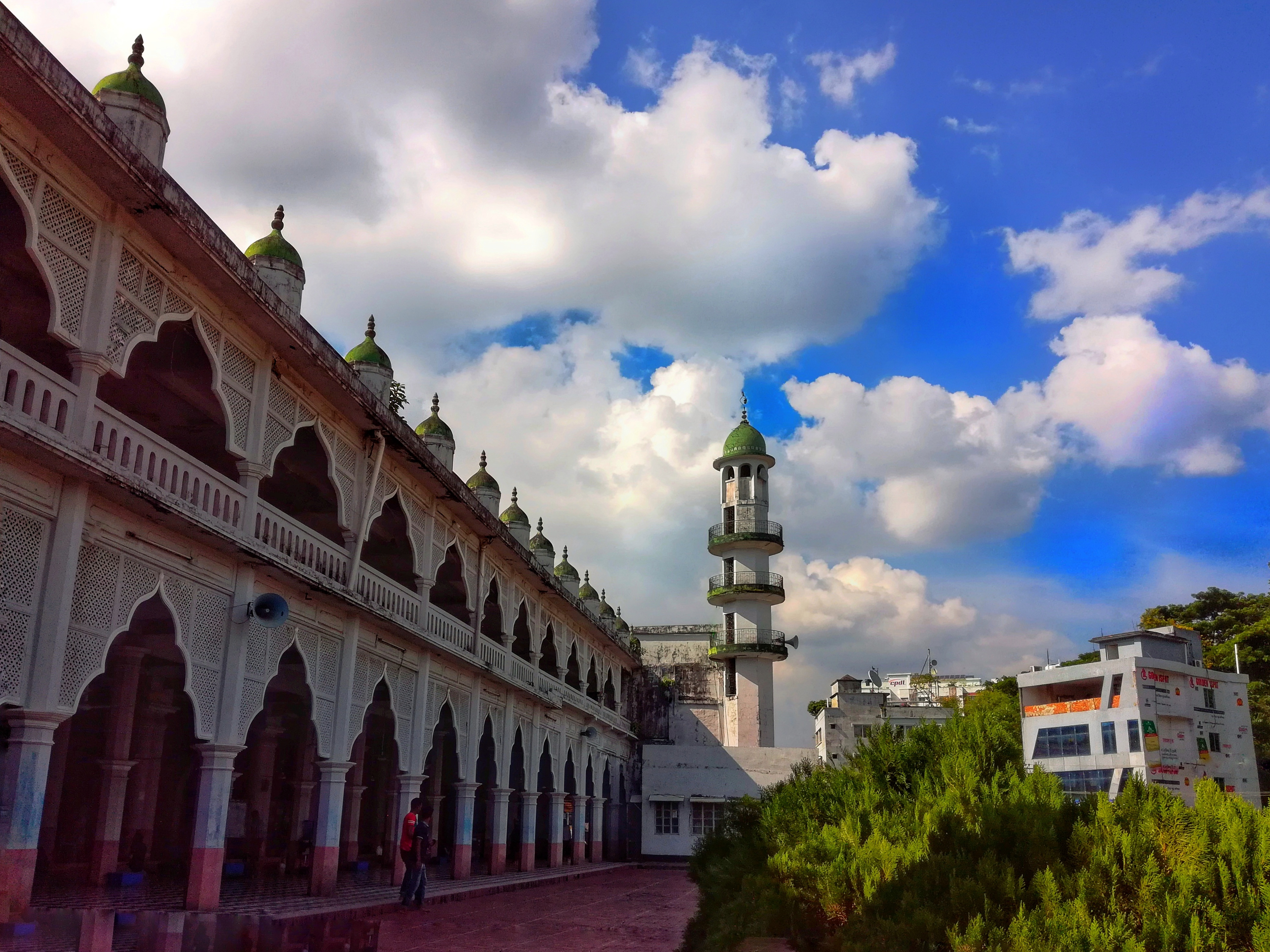
- Anderkilla Shahi Jama Masjid
- Interactive map of Kotwali
- Location in Chittagong division Location in Bangladesh
- Coordinates: 22°20.3′N 91°50.3′E
- Country: Bangladesh
- Division: Chittagong Division
- District: Chittagong District
- Metropolis: Chittagong
- Jatiya Sangsad constituency: Chittagong-9
- Formed: 1978; 48 years ago

Government
  - Type: Metropolitan Police
  - Body: Chattogram Metropolitan Police
  - Officer in Charge: Muhammad Fazlul Quader Chowdhury

Area
  - Total: 6.24 km^{2} (2.41 sq mi)
- Elevation: 15 m (49 ft)

Population (2022)
  - Total: 231,872
  - Density: 39,566/km^{2} (102,480/sq mi)
- Time zone: UTC+6 (BST)
- Postal code: 4000
- Area code: 031

Kotwali (Bengali: কোতোয়ালী, চট্টগ্রাম) is a thana of Chittagong District in Chittagong Division, Bangladesh.

== Geography ==
Chittagong Kotwali Thana is located at 22.3375°N 91.8389°E. It has 43062 households and a total area of 6.24 km^{2}.

== Demographics ==
Religions in Kotwali Thana (2022)
| Religion | Percent |
| Islam | 55.92% |
| Hinduism | 40.24% |
| Buddhism | 3.09% |
| Christianity | 0.75% |
| Other or not stated | 0.01% |

According to the 2022 Bangladeshi census, Kotwali Thana had 54,427 households and a population of 231,872. 5.88% of the population were under 5 years of age. Kotwali had a literacy rate (age 7 and over) of 88.88%: 89.00% for males and 88.73% for females, and a sex ratio of 121.99 males for every 100 females.

At the 1991 Bangladesh census, Chittagong Kotwali had a population of 246,893, of whom 159,706 were aged 18 or older. Males constituted 62.62% of the population, and females constituted 37.38%. Chittagong Kotwali had an average literacy rate of 71.5% (7+ years), against the national average of 32.4%.

== Education ==
- Government Muslim High School
- Saint Placid's High School
- Government City College, Chattogram
- Chittagong Collegiate School and College
- Kazim Ali High School
- Dr. Khastagir Government Girls' High School
- Chittagong Municipal Model High School
- Aparnacharan City Corporation Girls' High School
- Chittagong Ideal School & College

According to Banglapedia, Kazim Ali High School, founded in 1885, is a notable secondary school.

== Gallery ==
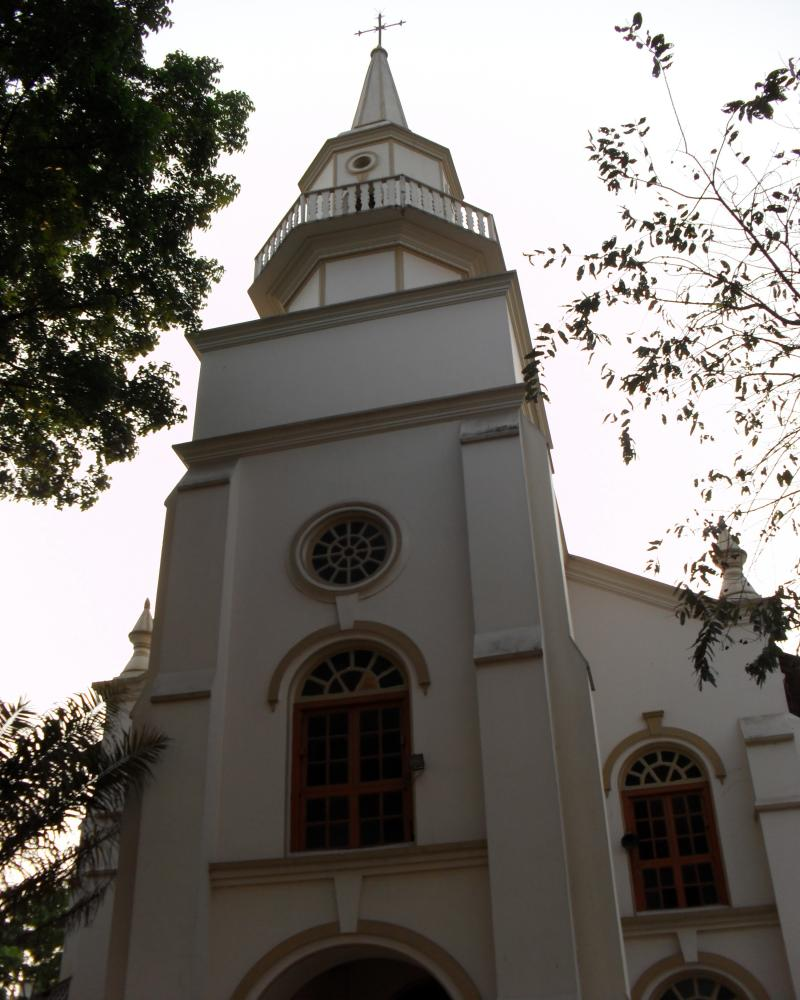
Roman Catholic Archdiocese of Chittagong

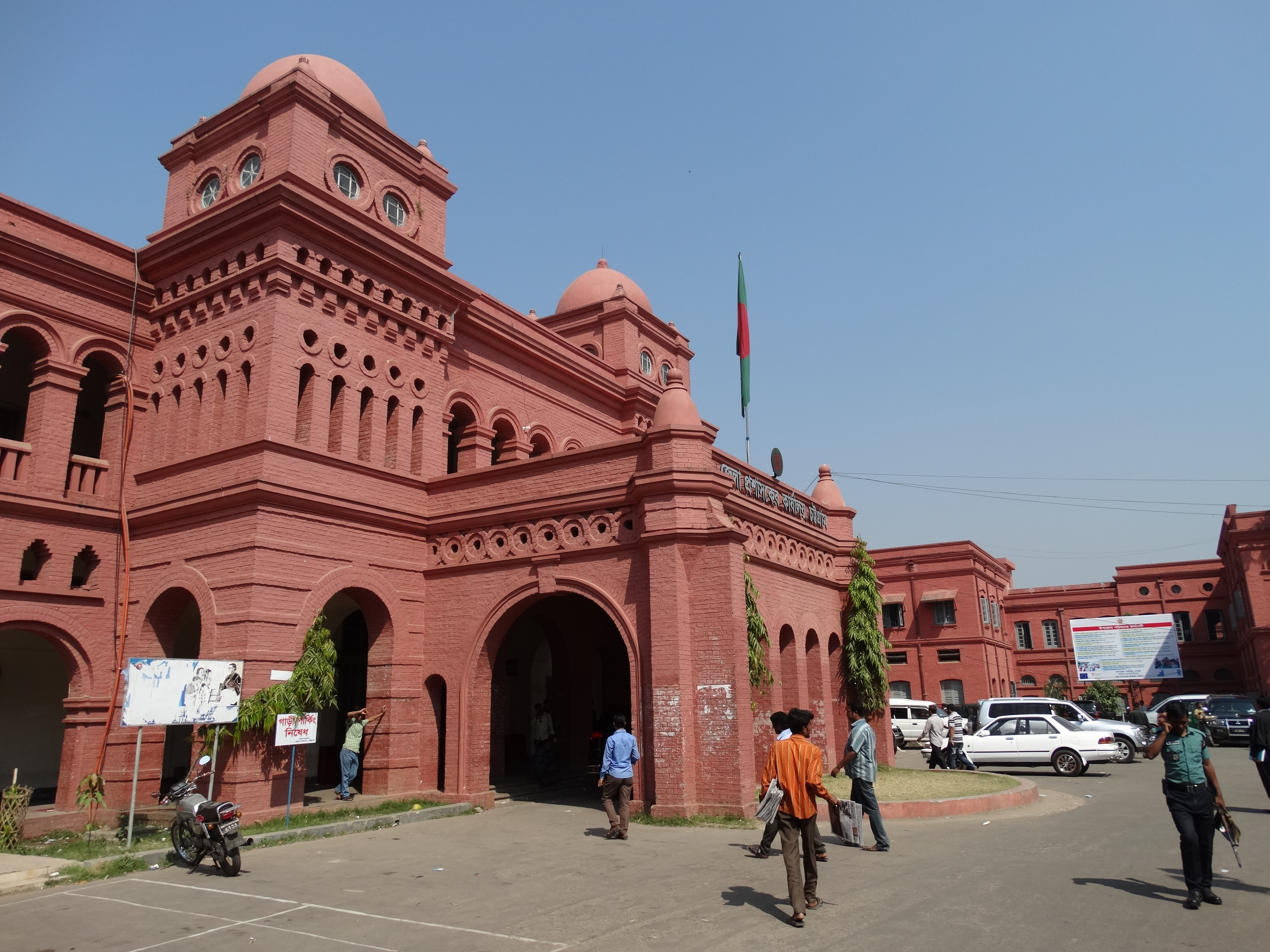
Chittagong Court Building

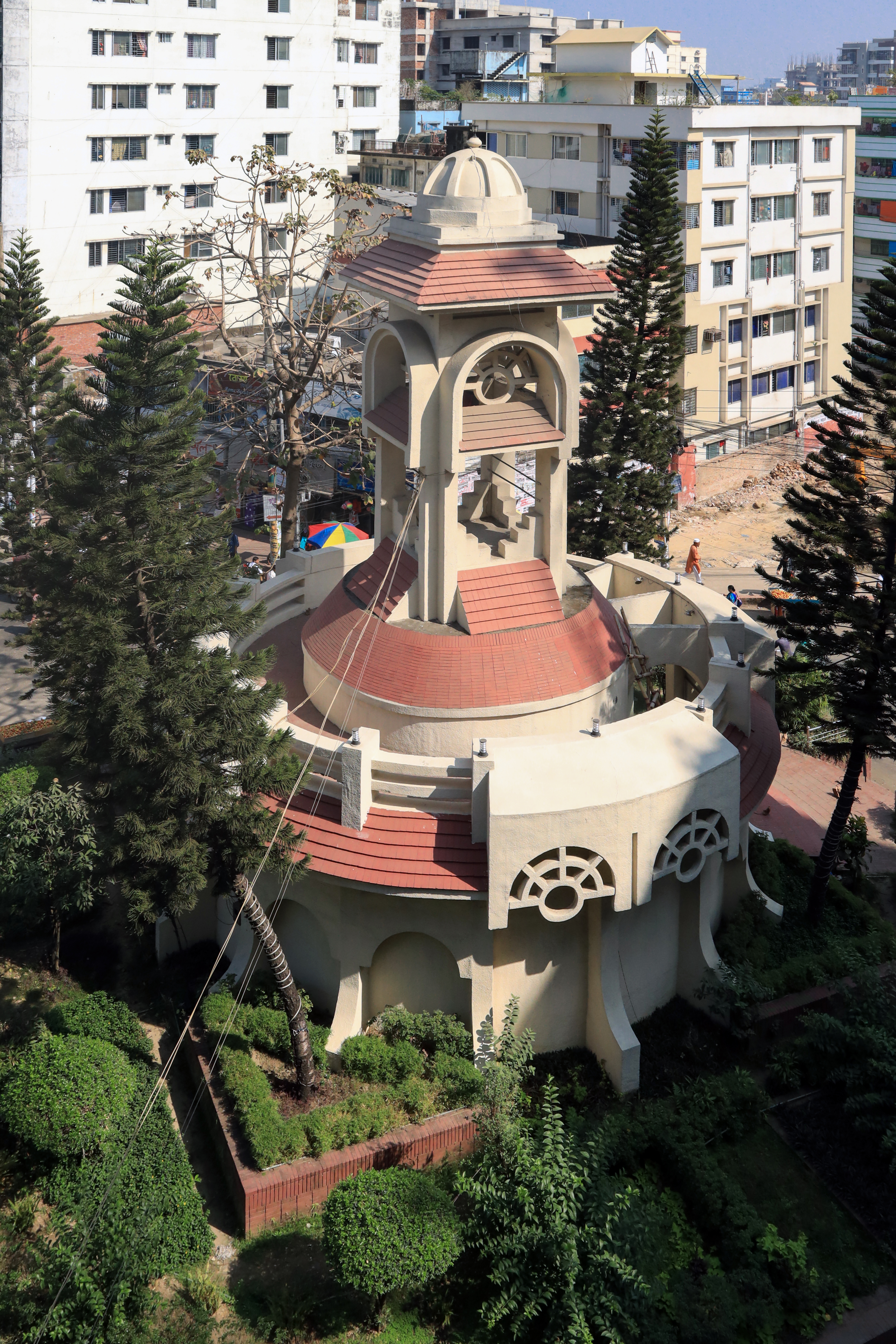
Cheragi Pahar

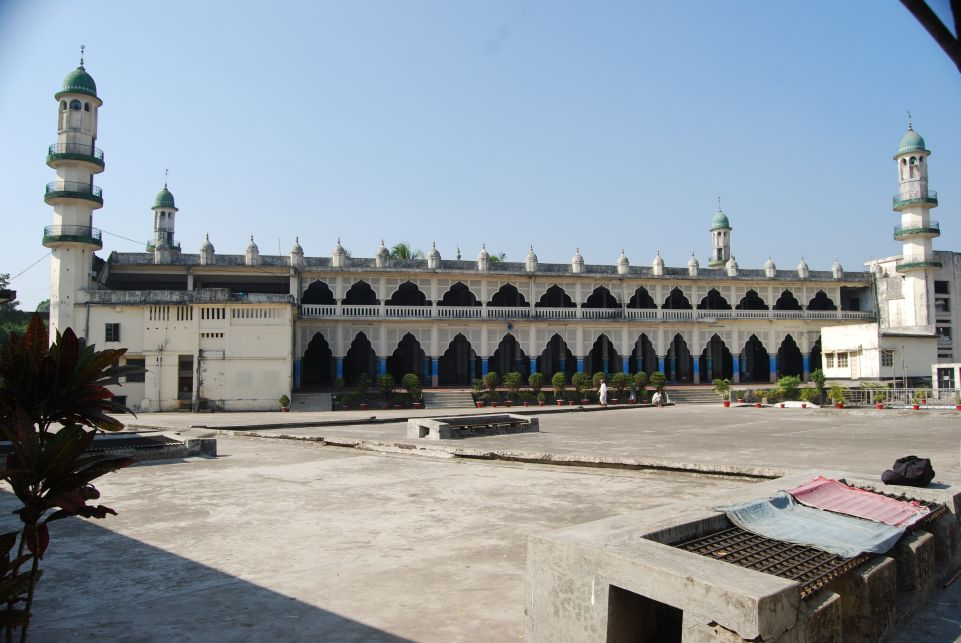
Anderkilla Shahi Jame Mosque

== See also ==
- Upazilas of Bangladesh
- Districts of Bangladesh
- Divisions of Bangladesh
