= University of Creative Technology Chittagong =

- Type: Private
- Established: 2015; 11 years ago
- Affiliations: UGC
- Chancellor: President Mohammed Shahabuddin
- Vice-Chancellor: Zahid Hossain Sharif
- Students: 3000
- Location: Chittagong, 4212, Bangladesh; 22.3685°N 91.8479°E
- Campus: Urban
- Website: www.uctc.edu.bd

University of Creative Technology Chittagong (Bengali: ইউনিভার্সিটি অব ক্রিয়েটিভ টেকনোলজি চিটাগং, also known as UCTC) is a private university in Chittagong, Bangladesh. It was established in 2015 under the Private University Act, 2010. The university offers undergraduate and post-graduate programmes taught in English.

== Administration ==
- Vice-Chancellor: Zahid Hossain Sharif
- Pro Vice-Chancellor: Sk Sayel
- Treasurer: Ahmed Sharif Talukder
- Registrar: Salahuddin Ahmed

== Academic session ==
The academic session at University of Creative Technology Chittagong comprises two semesters. Each semester consists of six months.

- Spring (January to June)
- Autumn (July to December)

== Academic programmes ==
University of Creative Technology Chittagong offers seven programmes under three schools.

=== School of Business ===
- Bachelor of Business Administration
- Master of Business Administration

=== School of Science and Engineering ===
- Bachelor of Science (BSc) in Mechanical Engineering
- Bachelor of Science (BSc) in Civil Engineering
- Bachelor of Science (BSc) in Computer Science and Engineering
- Bachelor of Science (BSc) in Electrical and Electronic Engineering

=== School of Arts and Social Science ===
- Bachelor of Arts (BA) (Hons) in English Language and Literature
- Master of Public Health
- Bachelor of Arts (BA) in Islamic Studies
- Master of Islamic Studies

== Gallery ==
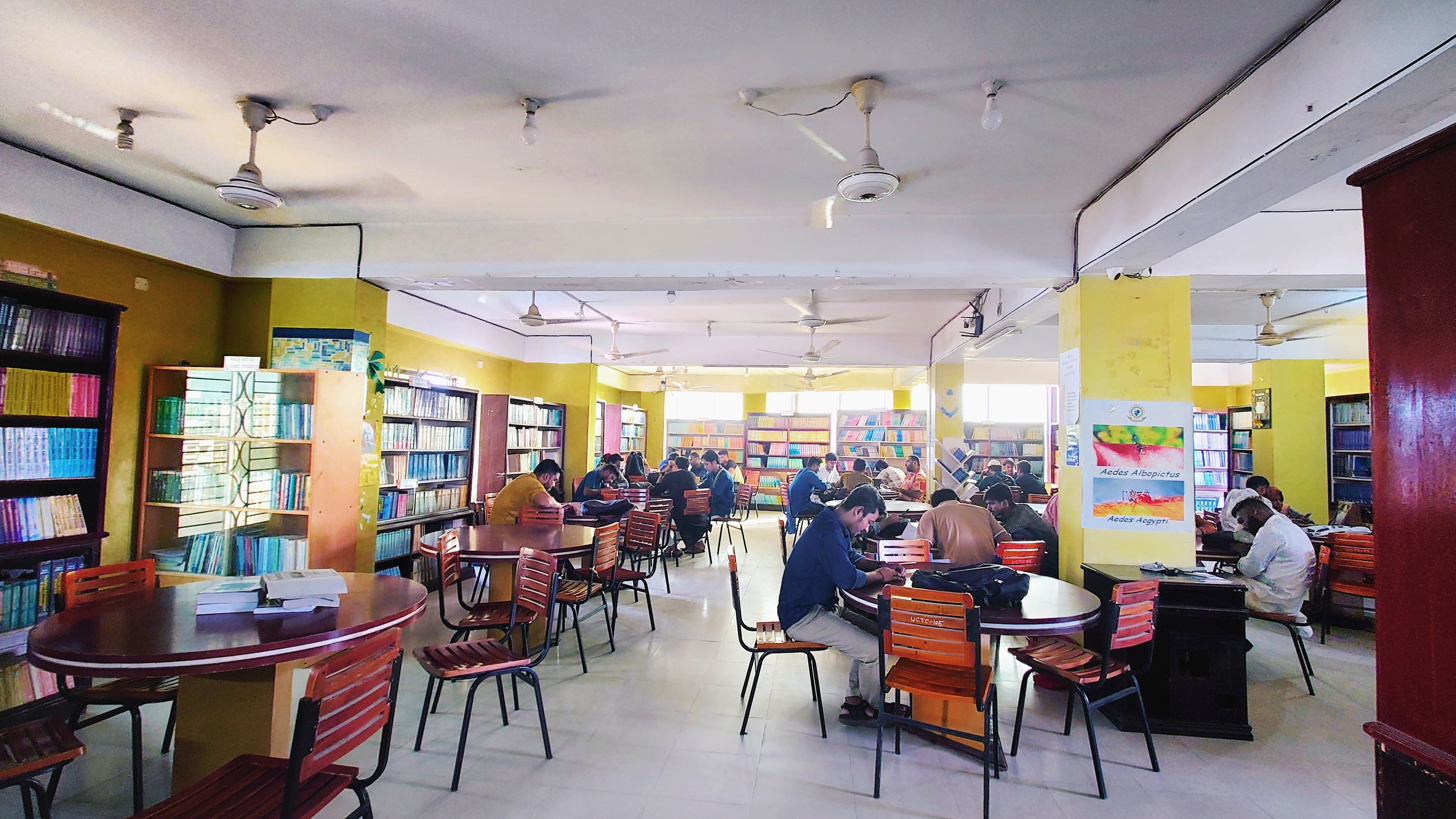
UCTC Library

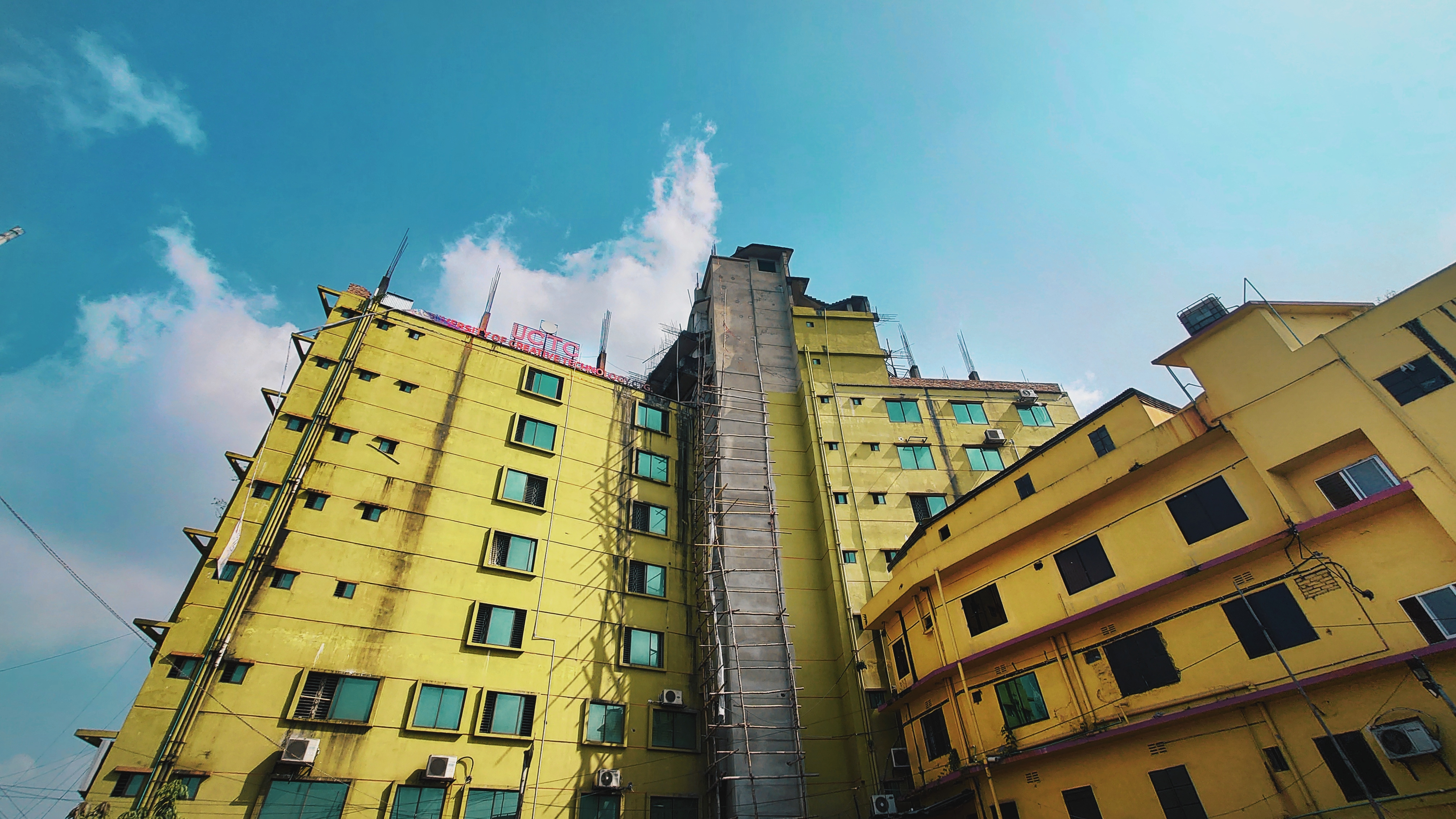
UCTC Campus Building

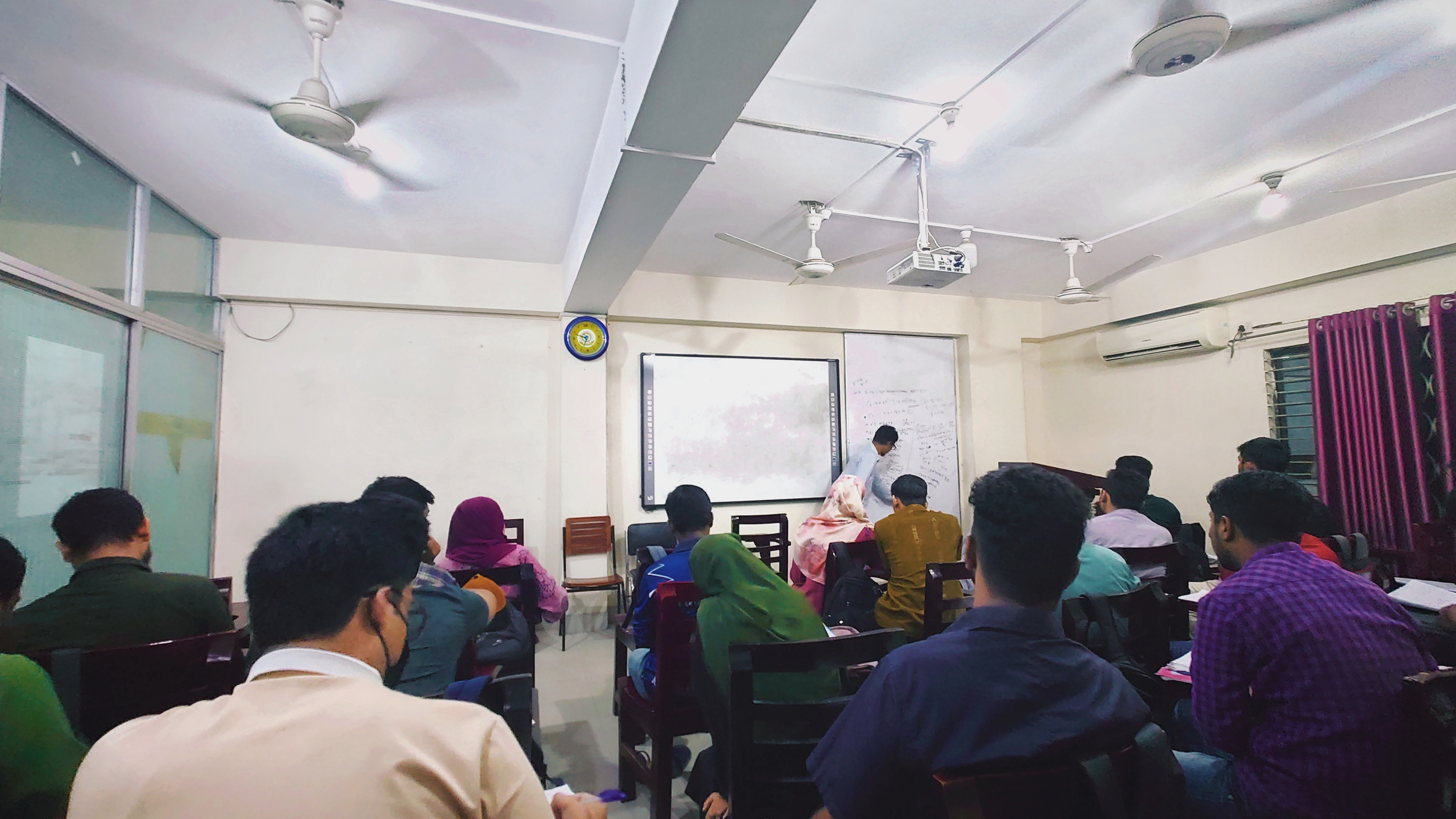
Class Room (Mechanical Engineering)
