= Government Art College, Chittagong =

Former Fine Arts College in Bangladesh

- সরকারী চারুকলা কলেজ, চট্টগ্রাম
- Present: Institute of Fine Arts, University of Chittagong
- Active: 1973–2009
- Affiliations: National University, Bangladesh (NU college Code: 4387)
- Location: Badshah Mia Chowdhury Road, Panchlaish, Chittagong, 4203, Bangladesh

Government Art College, Chittagong (1973 – 2009) was a public fine arts degree college, located at Badshah Miah Chowdhury road in Chittagong, Bangladesh. It was an association degree awarding college of National University.

== Background ==
On 3 August 1973, artist Rashid Choudhury and other associates established the Chittagong Art College in the abandoned building of the Pakistan Art Council in Chittagong as a Pre-degree course college of the University of Chittagong with the cooperation of the then minister Zahur Ahmad Chowdhury. In 1975 it was granted university recognition and in 1986 it was recognized as a degree college by the University of Chittagong. The first BFA batch of the college passed in 1978. Later, it was affiliated by the National University.

In 25 October 2009, the college was acquired by the University of Chittagong and the Department of Fine Arts of University of Chittagong was marged by the Institute of Fine Arts in the place of this college. Later on 2 August 2010, the Minister of Education officially handed over Fine Arts Institute under the registrar to University of Chittagong. Professor Mohammad Jasim Uddin took charge as director on 9 August 2010. Institute's educational program officially started from 10 August 2010. On 2 February 2011, the then Education Minister Nurul Islam Nahid inaugurated the Fine Arts Institute.
