= Chandra Kalindi Roy Henriksen =

Indigenous rights scholar

Chandra Kalindi Roy-Henriksen is a scholar of indigenous rights and the former chair of the Indigenous Peoples and Development Branch/Secretariat of the Permanent Forum on Indigenous Issues (IPDB/SPFII), an entity that describes its main function as supporting the work of the United Nations Permanent Forum on Indigenous Issues.

== Works ==
- Roy, Rajkumari Chandra (2000). Land Rights of the Indigenous Peoples of the Chittagong Hill Tracts, Bangladesh (PDF). Copenhagen: International Work Group for Indigenous Affairs. ISBN 9788790730291.
- Chandra Roy; Mike Kaye (2002). The International Labour Organization: A Handbook for Minorities and Indigenous Peoples (PDF). Minority Rights Group International and Anti-Slavery International. ISBN 1897693397.
- Roy, Chandra; Tauli-Corpuz, Victoria; Medina, Amanda Romero (2004). Beyond the Silencing of the Guns. Tebtebb. ISBN 9789719284659.
