= Raozan R.R.A.C Model Government High School =

School in Bangladesh

Coordinates: 22.5409°N 91.9117°E

Raozan R.R.A.C. Model Government High School, also known as Raozan RRAC Adarsha School, is one of the oldest schools in Bangladesh.

== History ==
Raozan R.R.A.C. Model High School was established in 1835 in Raozan, Chittagong District, Bengal Presidency, British Raj, as a primary school when Lord William Bentinck was the Governor-General of India. It was developed into a junior school with English as the primary language taught with the support of Dataram Chowdhury and Munsif Shokar Ali. The school was destroyed in a fire and rebuilt with the support of Golam Kibria, who was the local sub-registrar of the Nawab of Dhaka Khwaja Abdul Ghani. The nawab donated money for the reconstruction, and it was subsequently renamed Nawab Abdul Ghani New English School. The first headmaster of the new school was Dwarikanath Biswas. The school was upgraded to a high school through the donations of Ramgati Dhar and Ramdhan Dhar. Another school was opened besides this one by Abdul Bari Chowdhury. The two schools competed against each other for students. The local influentials in the area, to prevent further harmful competition, helped combine the schools into one and named it Ramgati-Ramdhan-Abdul Bari Chowdhury (R.R.A.C.) Model School.
