= Barakhain Jameya Jamhuria Fazil Madrasah =

Madrasa in Chittagong, Bangladesh

- الجامعة الجمهورية الفاضلية بارخائن
- Other names: Jamhuria Madrasah
- Motto: ربّ زدنى علمًا; O lord, shower me with knowledge.
- Type: Fazil (degree)
- Established: 1974; 52 years ago
- Parent institution: Alia Madrasah
- Affiliations: Islamic Arabic University
- Religious affiliation: Sunni
- President: Abu Taher Mahmud
- Principal: Abdul Khaleq Shawquey
- Academic staff: 21 (2020)
- Students: 948 (2020)
- Location: Barakhain, Anwara, Chittagong, Bangladesh.

Barakhain Jameya Jamhuria Fazil Madrasah (Arabic: الجامعة الجمهورية الفاضلية بارخائن, Bengali: বারখাইন জামেয়া জমহুরিয়া ফাযিল মাদরাসা) is an Islamic institution situated at Barakhain in Anwara, Chittagong. It was established to train the students Islam-based education and culture in 1974.

== Location ==
This madrasah is located at Barakhain Union in Anwara, Chittagong, Bangladesh.

== History ==
The madrasah mentioned above was established with the locals' co-operation in 1974. In 1975, it was accepted with dakhil level (SSC) by Bangladesh Madrasah Education Board. Also, it was granted to teach the students up to alim level (HSC) by same board in 1996. Again It was permitted to take classes up to Fazil level (degree) by Islamic Arabic University in 2017.

== Accomplishment ==
The madrasah was entitled as the best institution from upazila level by National Education Week-16 organised by Education Ministry.

== Facilities ==
There are an open playground, a mosque, a large pond, an IT room, a library and a hostel for students in the madrasah.

== Teachers ==
There are 21 teachers and 3 staffs in this institution.

== Students ==
There are almost 950 students in the madrasah, as of (2020). The students from this madrasah go for higher education to the university passing the grade JDC, dakhil, alim and fazil every year.
