= Chittagong Government Model School and College =

Coordinates: 22°22′3.85″N 91°48′37.38″E

- চট্টগ্রাম সরকারি মডেল স্কুল এন্ড কলেজ

Location
- Khulshi, Nasirabad; Chittagong; Bangladesh

Information
- Type: Public institution
- Motto: জ্ঞানই আলো (Knowledge is Power)
- Established: 2007
- Founder: Ministry of Education, Bangladesh
- Authority: Government of Bangladesh
- Language: Bengali
- Campus: Urban
- Campus size: 3.5 acres
- Sports: Cricket, Football
- Website: cmsc.edu.bd

Chittagong Government Model School and College (Bengali: চট্টগ্রাম সরকারি মডেল স্কুল এন্ড কলেজ) is a government owned educational institution situated in the port city Chittagong, Bangladesh established by the Ministry of Education of the country. It is one of the eleven model educational institution established in the six divisional towns of the country.

== About ==
The institution offers education for students from first grade to twelfth grade. The teachers are appointed by the Ministry of Education, through a competitive recruitment examination.

== History ==
To meet the need of educational institutions in Bangladesh, the Ministry of Education established eleven Model schools and colleges in districts of Bangladesh. Chittagong Model School & College was one of them. It started her first HSC batch in 2007 and S.S.C in 2008.

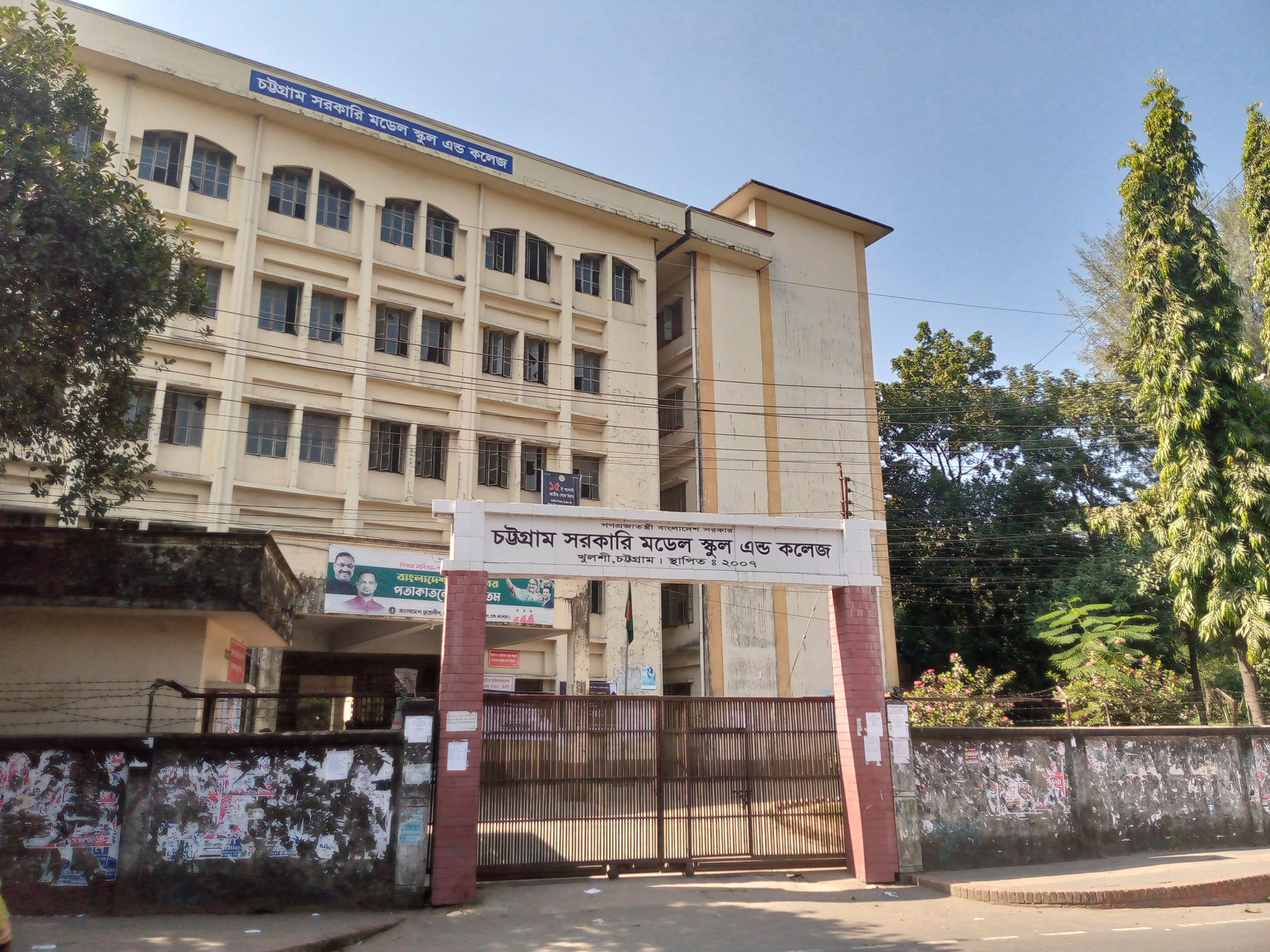
Main academic building

== Campus ==
The institution is known for its natural and architectural beauty which is surrounded by green hills, trees and gardens. The main academic building has five floors and is a rectangular-shaped building. It has laboratories for physics, chemistry, mathematics, and computer science. There is a library, seminar hall for teachers, gymnasium for male and female students, teacher's common-room, and common-room for guardians, accounts room, principal's room, computer operator's room and enough classrooms for students.

The quarter of the principal is inside the campus situated beside the academic building. The Technical Training Center (TTC), Chittagong is situated beside the institution.

== Admission ==
Admissions in grade I-IX are based on an entrance examination, which is competitive. Admission in HSC level is based on the result of Secondary School Certificate (SSC) examination. Every year it takes about 450 students in science, 300 in commerce and 150 in humanities group in HSC level. Students have to apply through sms method for the admission. Last year, requirement for applying for HSC admission was GPA 5.00 for Science, 4.00 for Commerce and 3.50 for Humanities group. Students are admitted among the applied, according to their merit position in the list provided by Chittagong Education Board.

In class I-IX there are almost 60 seats (30 for male and 30 for female) in every class. The students who pass SSC from this institution get opportunity to get themselves admitted into higher secondary level directly.

== Events and programs ==
CMSC events promote school spirit and are for enjoyment or for philanthropic causes. Some are open only to students in certain years, while others to the entire student population, alumni, and their friends and families.

Every year the institution authority arranges sporting events. The college organises a function on 21 February to observe International Mother Language Day every year. It holds programs on the occasions of Pohela Boishakh, Independence Day of Bangladesh, and National Victory Day.

== See also ==
- List of schools in Chittagong
