= Bandar Thana =

Thana in Chattogram Division, Bangladesh

Chittagong Bandar চট্টগ্রাম বন্দর
- Thana
- Chattogram Port Thana
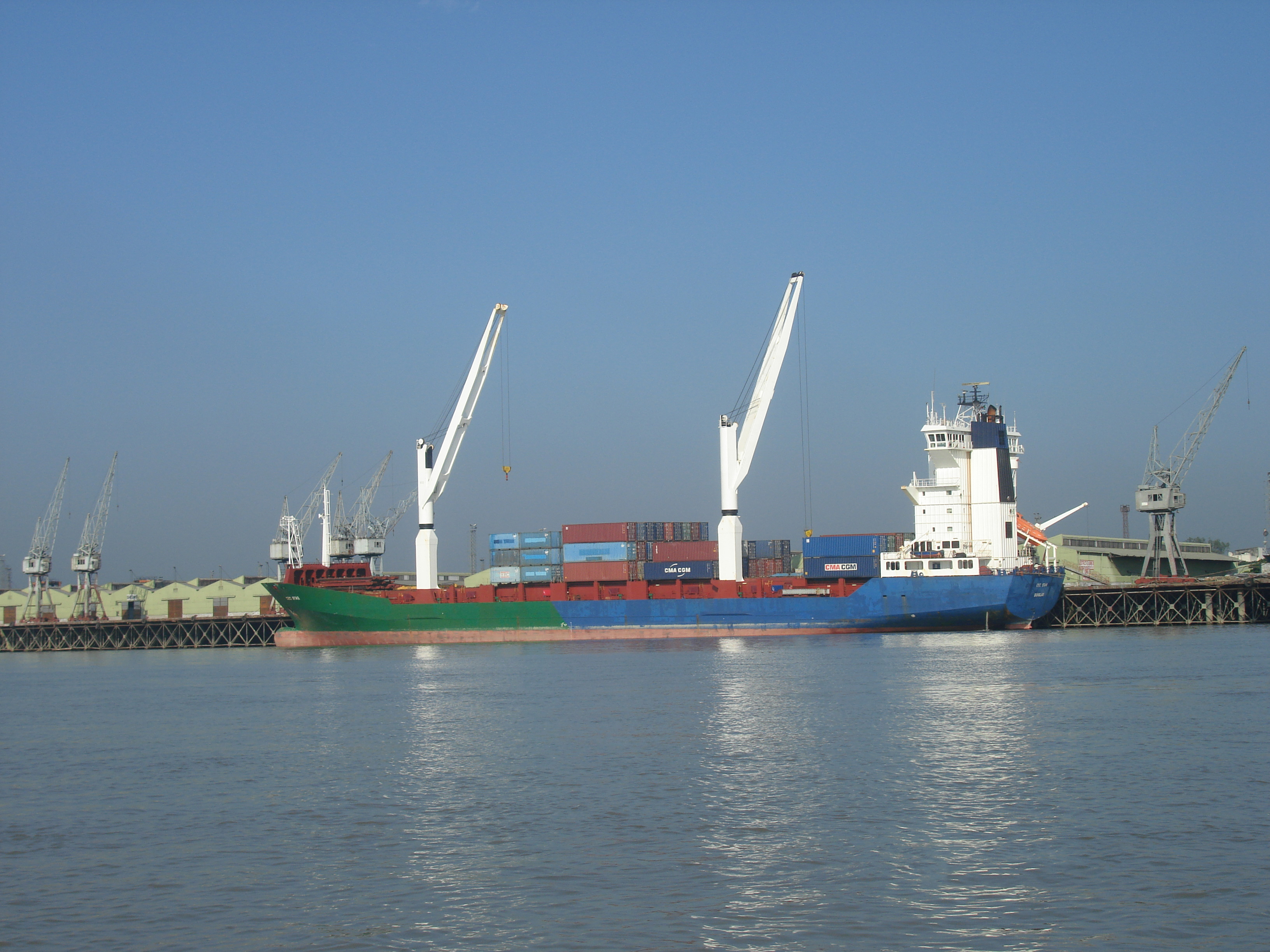
- The port of Chittagong

- Location in Bangladesh
- Coordinates: 22°16.8′N 91°47.5′E
- Country: Bangladesh
- Division: Chittagong Division
- District: Chittagong District

Area
  - Total: 44.63 km^{2} (17.23 sq mi)
- Elevation: 15 m (49 ft)

Population (2022)
  - Total: 171,054
  - Density: 4,207/km^{2} (10,900/sq mi)
- Time zone: UTC+6 (BST)
- Postal code: 4100
- Area code: 031
- Website: bangladesh.gov.bd/maps/images/chittagong/ChittagongBandarT.gif

Chattogram Bandar (Bengali: চট্টগ্রাম বন্দর) is a thana of Chattogram District in Chattogram Division, Bangladesh.

== Geography ==
Chittagong port is located at 22.2806°N 91.7917°E . It has 30762 households and total area 44.63 km^{2}.

== Demographics ==
At the 1991 Bangladesh census, Chittagong port had a population of 187,739, of whom 100,373 were aged 18 or older. Males constituted 57.22% of the population, and females 42.78%. Chittagong port had an average literacy rate of 56.5% (7+ years), against the national average of 32.4%.

== See also ==
- Upazilas of Bangladesh
- Districts of Bangladesh
- Divisions of Bangladesh
