= Akbarshah Thana =

Thana in Chattogram Division, Bangladesh

Akbor Shah আকবর শাহ
- Thana
- Location in Bangladesh Akbor Shah (Bangladesh)
- Coordinates: 22.3737°N 91.7810°E
- Country: Bangladesh
- Division: Chittagong Division
- District: Chittagong District
- Elevation: 15 m (49 ft)

Population (2022)
  - Total: 151,686
- Time zone: UTC+6 (BST)
- Postal code: 4207
- Area code: 031

Akbar Shah (Bengali: আকবর শাহ) is a thana under the Chattogram District in Chattogram Division, Bangladesh.

== Demographics ==
Religions in Akbarshah Thana (2022)
Religion	Percent
Islam	88.31%
Hinduism	11.18%
Buddhism	0.42%
Other or not stated	0.08%

According to the 2022 Bangladeshi census, Akbarshah Thana had 37,451 households and a population of 151,686. 8.71% of the population were under 5 years of age. Akbarshah had a literacy rate (age 7 and over) of 84.22%: 85.94% for males and 82.46% for females, and a sex ratio of 103.63 males for every 100 females.

== See also ==
- Upazilas of Bangladesh
- Districts of Bangladesh
- Divisions of Bangladesh
