= Chittagong City Corporation Municipal Model School and College =

Govt.Municipal Model High School
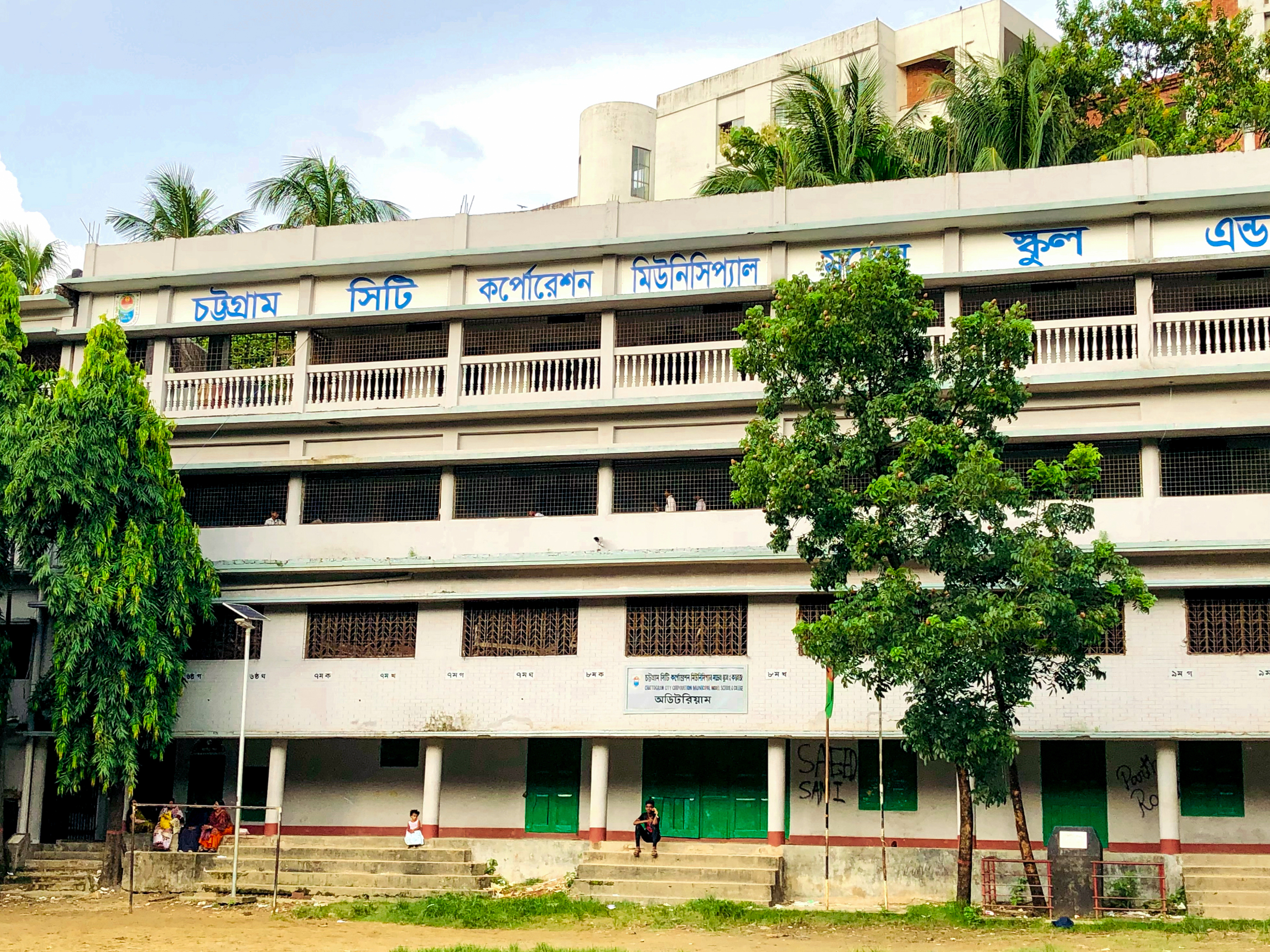
- Academic building, MMHS

Location
- Jane Alam dovas Road; Court hill Rd, Jubilee Rd, Chittagong 4000; Bangladesh
- 22.3360°N 91.8323°E

Information
- Former name: Municipal Model High School
- Type: Government
- Established: 1880; 146 years ago
- Founder: Shyamacharan Sen
- School district: Chittagong District
- Principal: Shahedul Kabir Chowdhury MSc(Botany); BSc(Hon's) University of Chittagong
- Teaching staff: 40+
- Grades: 6th to 12th Grade
- Enrollment: 2,400
  - Grade 10: 250+
- Average class size: 40 < 70
- Education system: National Curriculum (Ministry of Education Bangladesh)
- Classrooms: 35+
- Campus type: Urban
- Colors: White and Black
- Sports: Hockey
- Alumni: Anupam Sen Bangladeshi Sociologist, Author & Vice-chancellor of the Premier University.
- Website: School Website

Municipal Model High School (Bengali: চট্টগ্রাম মিউনিসিপাল মডেল উচ্চ বিদ্যালয়), established in 1880, is one of the oldest schools in Bangladesh.The school is located at the Chittagong Biapni Bitan. In fact, it is adjacent to the north boundary wall of the Market which people know as Newmarket in Chittagong. It provides education from 6th to 12th grade.

== History ==
In 1880, Municipal High School was established by a Chittagonian social worker named Shyamacharan Sen. It was first established as a junior English School. Founder Shyamacharan served as the first principal of Municipal High School.
