= Sadarghat, Chittagong =

Thana in Chattogram Division, Bangladesh

Sadarghat সদরঘাট
- Thana
- Location in Bangladesh
- Coordinates: 22°19′30″N 91°49′30″E
- Country: Bangladesh
- Division: Chittagong Division
- District: Chittagong District
- Elevation: 15 m (49 ft)

Population (2022)
  - Total: 106,519
- Time zone: UTC+6 (BST)
- Postal code: 4000
- Area code: 031
- Website: Official map of Sadarghat

Sadarghat (Bengali: সদরঘাট) is a thana under the Chattogram District in Chattogram Division, Bangladesh.

== Demographics ==
Religions in Sadarghat Thana (2022)
Religion	Percent
Islam	81.57%
Hinduism	17.76%
Buddhism	0.49%
Other or not stated	0.17%

According to the 2022 Bangladeshi census, Sadarghat Thana had 25,830 households and a population of 106,519. 7.25% of the population were under 5 years of age. Sadarghat had a literacy rate (age 7 and over) of 85.44%: 86.77% for males and 83.99% for females, and a sex ratio of 109.30 males for every 100 females.

== See also ==
- Upazilas of Bangladesh
- Districts of Bangladesh
- Divisions of Bangladesh
