= Panchlaish Thana =

Thana in Chattogram Division, Bangladesh

Panchlaish পাঁচলাইশ
- Thana
- Location in Bangladesh
- Coordinates: 22°22′N 91°49.5′E
- Country: Bangladesh
- Division: Chittagong Division
- District: Chittagong District

Area
  - Total: 27.45 km^{2} (10.60 sq mi)
- Elevation: 15 m (49 ft)

Population (2022)
  - Total: 219,903
  - Density: 7,044/km^{2} (18,240/sq mi)
- Time zone: UTC+6 (BST)
- Postal code: 4203
- Area code: 031
- Website: bangladesh.gov.bd/maps/images/chittagong/PanchlaishT.gif

Panchlaish (Bengali: পাঁচলাইশ) is a thana of Chattogram District in Chattogram Division, Bangladesh.

== Geography ==
Panchlaish is located at 22.3667°N 91.8250°E . It has 37105 households and total area 27.45 km^{2}.

== Demographics ==
Religions in Panchlaish Thana (2022)
Religion	Percent
Islam	89.76%
Hinduism	7.96%
Buddhism	2.05%
Other or not stated	0.23%

According to the 2022 Bangladeshi census, Panchlaish Thana had 52,444 households and a population of 219,903. 7.06% of the population were under 5 years of age. Panchlaish had a literacy rate (age 7 and over) of 88.14%: 89.60% for males and 86.48% for females, and a sex ratio of 113.37 males for every 100 females.

At the 1991 Bangladesh census, Panchlaish had a population of 193,357, of whom 112,099 were aged 18 or older. Males constituted 59.39% of the population, and females 40.61%. Panchlaish had an average literacy rate of 59.3% (7+ years), against the national average of 32.4%.

== Points of interest ==
Rupali Guitar, an 18-foot-high (5.5 m) stainless steel sculpture memorializing Ayub Bachchu, was erected in the Prabartak roundabout in 2019.

== See also ==
- Upazilas of Bangladesh
- Districts of Bangladesh
- Divisions of Bangladesh

== Notable residents ==
- Shakil Khan, film actor
