= Chittagong Independent University =

Private University in Chattogram, Bangladesh

- চিটাগং ইন্ডিপেন্ডেন্ট ইউনিভার্সিটি
- CIU Logo
- Other name: CIU
- Motto: Lord Advance me in knowledge
- Type: Private
- Established: 6 February 2013; 13 years ago
- Affiliations: University Grants Commission (UGC)
- Chancellor: President Mirza Fakhrul Islam Alamgir
- Vice-Chancellor: Professor Dr. M M Nurul Absar
- Location: Jamal Khan, Chittagong, 4000, Bangladesh; 22.3461°N 91.8340°E
- Campus: Urban
- Website: ciu.edu.bd

Chittagong Independent University (Bengali: চিটাগং ইনডিপেন্ডেন্ট ইউনিভার্সিটি or CIU) is a private university in Chattogram, Bangladesh.

It started its journey in Chittagong in 1999 as an additional campus of Independent University Bangladesh (IUB). IUB and the founding trust pioneered the establishment of private universities in Bangladesh. CIU was formed by the same trust ESTCDT after the amendment by the private university Act. which required that the Chittagong campus be registered as a separate university. Accordingly, CIU was founded on 6 February 2013 in succession.

== Admission ==
The applicants have to pass the competitive admission test administered by the university. The admission examination tests each student's potential to successfully pursue the undergraduate or graduate degree programs.

=== Semesters ===
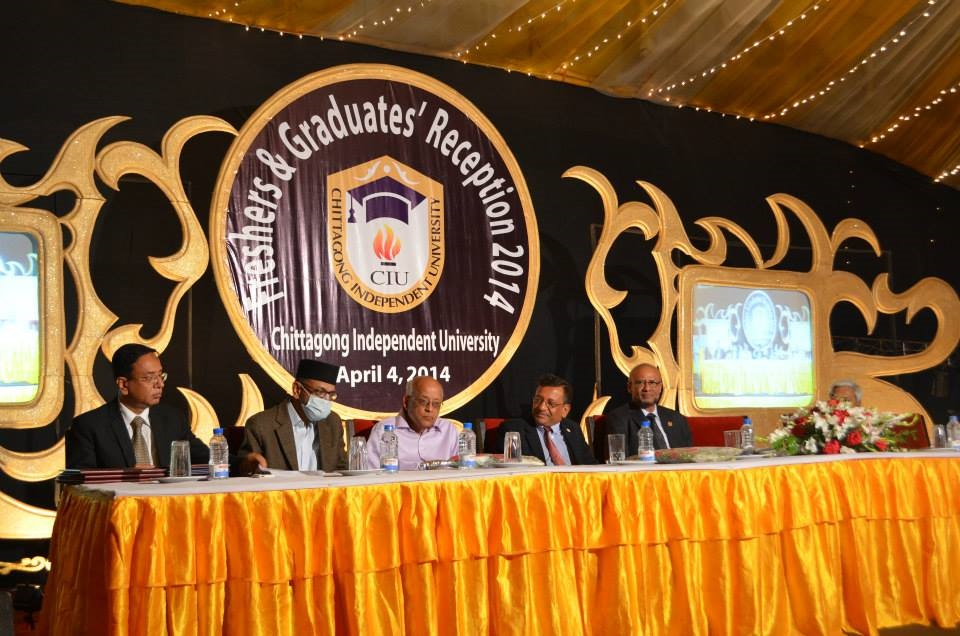
Reception programme in 2014 at the university

The academic year of the university incorporates two regular semesters (spring and autumn) and one short semester (summer). The duration of each semesters are:

- Spring Semester: January–April
- Summer Semester: May–August
- Autumn Semester: September–December

== List of vice-chancellors ==
- Mahfuzul Hoque Chowdhury (present)

== Academics ==
The medium of instruction of all academic programs at CIU is English. Classes are conducted by full participation of students (discussion, question-answer, projects).

=== Programs ===
CIU is a private higher education institution in Chattogram, Bangladesh, offering higher secondary and degree-granting programs across four primary academic schools: the CIU Business School, the School of Science and Engineering, the School of Law, and the School of Liberal Arts and Social Sciences. Its academic offerings span undergraduate degrees, including Bachelor of Business Administration (BBA), B.Sc. in Computer Science and Engineering (CSE), B.Sc. in Electrical and Electronic Engineering (EEE), LL.B. (Hons.), and BA in English, as well as postgraduate studies comprising Master of Business Administration (MBA), LL.M., and Master of Arts (MA) programs in specialized disciplines.

== Facilities ==
Library

The library of CIU is the collection of the knowledge and built up a collection in Business Administration, Science and Technology, Computer, Arts and Social Science. It is an open library system to students of CIU, which provides rich collection of books including journals, newsletter, thesis works, audio-visual materials and CDs. The library has online access to Emerald, Jstor, Oxford University Press Journal and Hinari. CIU has a fully functional digital library which has more than 10,000 documents. These documents include not only books and articles on science and engineering, but also on ranging topics like language, philosophy, history, social science, etc. It also stores over 3,000 theses and dissertations of universities from all over the world. The system is accessible through the internet. All books and journals titles can be accessed through CIU library online databases.

Lab facilities

CIU has physics lab, circuits lab, microprocessor and interfacing lab, digital signal processing lab, telecommunication lab, network lab, and machines lab. Among the equipments used for conducting laboratory classes in these labs include antenna and wave propagation trainer, spectrum analyzer, digital storage oscilloscope, digital and analogue communication trainer, fiber optics trainer, control system trainer, electrical machines training system, digital signal processing trainer, microprocessor trainer, industrial electronics training system, data communication and networking training system, mobile communication trainer. Besides these laboratories, CIU also has three fully equipped computer laboratories.;

Internship / senior project

All students are required to take part in an industrial internship or senior project as part of their four-year program. The internship experience gives them a hands-on experience of working in an industrial environment; while the senior projects give them an exposure to conduct guided research work.
