= Bayazid Thana =

Thana in Chattogram Division, Bangladesh

Bayazid Bostami Thana বায়েজীদ বোস্তামী
- Thana
- Bayejid Bostami Thana
- Location in Bangladesh Bayazid Bostami Thana (Bangladesh)
- Coordinates: 22.379447°N 91.820292°E
- Country: Bangladesh
- Division: Chittagong Division
- District: Chittagong District
- Elevation: 15 m (49 ft)

Population (2022)
  - Total: 392,242
- Time zone: UTC+6 (BST)
- Postal code: 4210
- Area code: 031

Bayazid Bostami (Bengali: বায়েজীদ বোস্তামী) is a thana of Chattogram District in Chattogram Division, Bangladesh. There are three wards under the Thana.

== History ==
This thana is named after the Persian Sufi Bayazid Bostami one of whose shrine is located under this thana. It was established on 27 May 2000.

== Geography ==
Total area of this thana is 17.58 km^{2} It is located at 22.379447°N 91.820292°E.

== Demographics ==
Religions in Bayejid Bostami Thana (2022)
Religion	Percent
Islam	93.63%
Hinduism	5.05%
Buddhism	1.21%
Other or not stated	0.11%

According to the 2022 Bangladeshi census, Bayejid Bostami Thana had 99,601 households and a population of 392,242. 8.76% of the population were under 5 years of age. Bayejid Bostami had a literacy rate (age 7 and over) of 81.43%: 83.31% for males and 79.51% for females, and a sex ratio of 102.84 males for every 100 females.

== See also ==
- Upazilas of Bangladesh
- Districts of Bangladesh
- Divisions of Bangladesh
- Administrative geography of Bangladesh
