= Patiya Adarsha High School =

School in Patiya, Chittagong, Bangladesh

Coordinates: 22.2937°N 91.9804°E

- পটিয়া আদর্শ উচ্চ বিদ্যালয় image_alt =
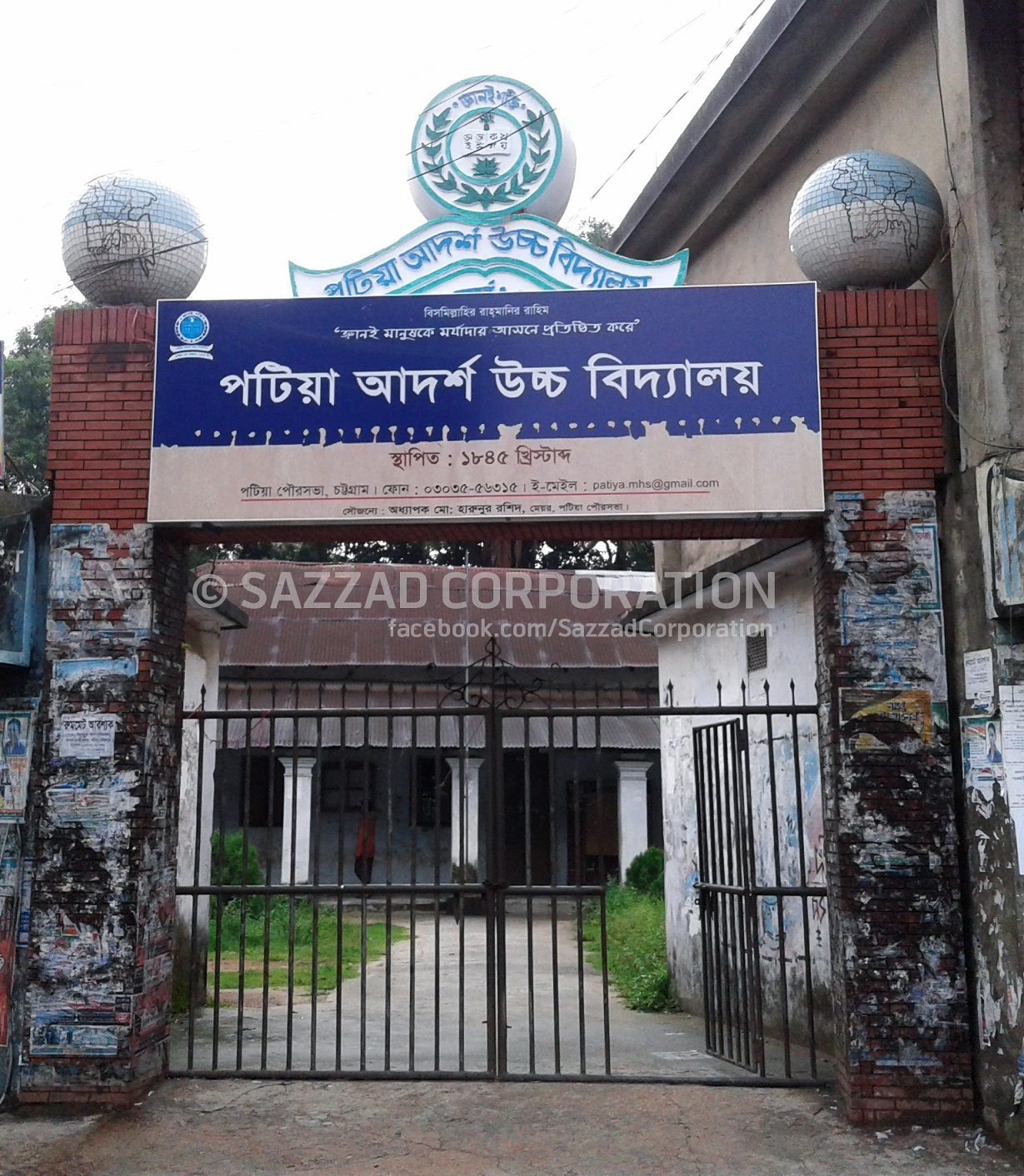
- Patiya, Chittagong; Bangladesh

Information
- Type: MPO(Half-Govt.) Affiliated School
- Established: 1845
- Head teacher: Mohammad Amir(acting)
- Enrollment: 1500 Approx.
- Affiliation: Ministry of Education — Board of Intermediate and Secondary Education, Chittagong
- Website: patiyamodelhighschool.simplesite.com

Patiya Aadorsho Uccho Bidyaloy (Patiya Model High School) is one of the oldest schools of Bangladesh. It was established in 1845 as an English-medium school by the founder Mr. Durga Kinkor Datta. The school was affiliated with Calcutta University in 1867. Now it is affiliated under Board of Intermediary and Secondary Education, Chittagong, Bangladesh.

== History ==
Patiya Model High School was established in 1845, first as a primary school, by Durgacharan Dutta in the village of Bhurshi under Patiya Upazila. Very soon, it was upgraded to a secondary school and with financial assistance provided by landlord Mir Yahia, it was converted to a junior English school, of which Durgacharan Dutta was the first headmaster. In 1859, it became a high English school and the first batch of students from the school appeared at the entrance examinations in 1867.

The first headmaster of the Patiya High English School was Rasikchandra Chattopadhyay. Suryakumar was the headmaster from 1907 and 1935.

Once female students were allowed to study in the school in limited numbers but now only male students are allowed to enroll.

Late Mohammad Abul Kashem, who later took the responsibility of the school as its headmaster, brought significant changes in the school both in the educational system and infrastructural development. Mohammad Abul Kasem became the Headmaster of Patiya Model High School as the successor of 'Surya Sen and Ramesh Chandra Gupta' in 1976. He went on retirement in 1991 after carrying out responsibilities as the Head Master for 16 years.

The school now has eighteen teachers and more than 6000 books are available in the school library. The school has a library having some rare collections. There are three two-storied buildings in the school campus apart from a playground and two ponds. The school is located a quarter mile from the Patiya Police Station.

== Head teachers ==
- Durga Kinkor Datta (1845–1864),
- Rashik Chandra Benerjee (1864–1906),
- Surjya Kumar Sen (1907–1935),
- Manindra Lal Kanungoy (1936–1945),
- Profulla Kumar Bhattacherjee (1946–1949),
- Romesh Chandra Gupta (1950–1974),
- Abdur Rashid (1974–1976),
- Abul Kashem (1976–1991),
- Nurul Absar (1992–2006),
- Tushar Kanti Das (acting) 2006–2016.
- Mizanur Rahman (acting 2016–2018, regular 2018–2022)
- Sunil Kumar Barua (2022) acting
- Mohammad Amir (2023–present) acting

== Notable alumni ==
- Khan Bahadur Jalal Uddin Ahmad passed entrance in 1904. He was an orator and politician. He was a minister of the then undivided Bangla Government. He was a professor of Calcutta University and an expert in languages.
