= Double Mooring Thana =

Thana in Chattogram Division, Bangladesh

Double Mooring ডবলমুরিং
- Thana
- Location in Bangladesh
- Coordinates: 22°20.3′N 91°48.5′E
- Country: Bangladesh
- Division: Chittagong Division
- District: Chittagong District

Government
  - Officer In charge (CMP): Mohammad Mohsin PPM

Area
  - Total: 26.99 km^{2} (10.42 sq mi)
- Elevation: 15 m (49 ft)

Population (2022)
  - Total: 249,344
  - Density: 11,854/km^{2} (30,700/sq mi)
- Time zone: UTC+6 (BST)
- Postal code: 4100
- Area code: 031
- Website: bangladesh.gov.bd/maps/images/chittagong/DoubleMooringT.gif

Double Mooring (Bengali: ডবলমুরিং) is a thana of Chattogram District in Chattogram Division, Bangladesh.

== Geography ==
Double Mooring is located at 22.3375°N 91.8083°E . It has 58780 households and total area 26.99 km^{2}. Post code 4100.

== Demographics ==
Religions in Doublemooring Thana (2022)
Religion	Percent
Islam	91.14%
Hinduism	6.91%
Buddhism	1.87%
Other or not stated	0.07%

According to the 2022 Bangladeshi census, Doublemooring Thana had 62,783 households and a population of 249,344. 7.70% of the population were under 5 years of age. Doublemooring had a literacy rate (age 7 and over) of 84.57%: 86.42% for males and 82.46% for females, and a sex ratio of 112.73 males for every 100 females.

At the 1991 Bangladesh census, Double Mooring had a population of 319,945, of whom 185,888 were aged 18 or older. Males constituted 58.8% of the population, and females 41.2%. Double Mooring had an average literacy rate of 56.6% (7+ years), against the national average of 32.4%.

== See also ==
- Upazilas of Bangladesh
- Districts of Bangladesh
- Divisions of Bangladesh
