= Bakalia Thana =

Thana in Chattogram Division, Bangladesh

Bakalia বাকলিয়া
- Thana
- Interactive map of Bakalia
- Coordinates: 22.351479°N 91.851867°E
- Country: Bangladesh
- Division: Chittagong Division
- District: Chittagong District
- Elevation: 15 m (49 ft)

Population (2022)
  - Total: 226,143
- Time zone: UTC+6 (BST)
- Postal code: 4203
- Area code: 031

Bakalia (Bengali: বাকলিয়া) is a thana of Chattogram District in Chattogram Division, Bangladesh. Bakalia thana with an area of 12.33 km^{2} is located between 22°26' and 22°19' north latitudes and between 91°50' and 91°54' east longitudes. It is bounded by Chandgaon Thana on the north, Karnaphuli Upazila and Karnaphuli river on the east and south, and Chattogram Kotwali Thana on the west.

== Demographics ==
Religions in Bakalia Thana (2022)
Religion	Percent
Islam	92.21%
Hinduism	7.47%
Other or not stated	0.32%

According to the 2022 Bangladeshi census, Bakalia Thana had 53,170 households and a population of 226,143. 8.94% of the population were under 5 years of age. Bakalia had a literacy rate (age 7 and over) of 75.50%: 76.77% for males and 74.17% for females, and a sex ratio of 105.94 males for every 100 females.

== Education ==
Bakalia Government College was established as a government college in 2016.

According to Banglapedia, Bakalia Government Laboratory School is a notable secondary school.

== See also ==
- Upazilas of Bangladesh
- Districts of Bangladesh
- Divisions of Bangladesh
