= Port City International University =

Private university in Chittagong, Bangladesh

- পোর্ট সিটি ইন্টারন্যাশনাল ইউনিভার্সিটি
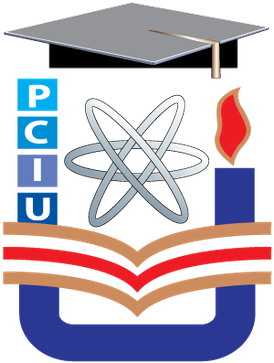
- Crest of Port City International University
- Other name: PCIU
- Type: Private, Research
- Established: May 17, 2013; 13 years ago
- Founder: Zahir Ahammed
- Accreditation: Institution of Engineers, Bangladesh; Institution of Textile Engineers and Technologists
- Affiliations: University Grants Commission (UGC)
- Budget: ৳54.90 crore (US$4.5 million) (2024-2025)
- Chairman: Md. Mojibur Rahman
- Chancellor: President Mirza Fakhrul Islam Alamgir
- Vice-Chancellor: Md. Nural Anwar
- Dean: Engr. Mafzal Ahmed (FoSE); Md. Fashiul Alam (FoBS); Mainul Hasan Chowdhury (FoHSSL)
- Academic staff: 250
- Administrative staff: 50
- Students: 6,000
- Undergraduates: 5,600
- Postgraduates: 400
- Location: 7-14, Nikunja Housing Society South Khulshi, Chittagong, Chittagong, Bangladesh; 22°21′34″N 91°48′35″E
- Campus: Urban
- Language: English
- Colors: Blue, Orange
- Website: portcity.edu.bd

Port City International University (Bengali: পোর্ট সিটি ইন্টারন্যাশনাল ইউনিভার্সিটি) or PCIU is a private university located in the 'port city' Chattogram, Bangladesh. The university was established under the Private University Act in 2013.

== History ==
The founding Chairman of PCIU is Mr. is Mr. Zahir Ahammed.

== Academics ==
=== Faculties and departments ===
Source: [1]

Academic activities are undertaken by 10 departments under three faculties. Twelve departments offer undergraduate courses.

==== Faculty of Science and Engineering ====
- B.Sc. and M.Sc. in Computer Science & Engineering (CSE)
- B.Sc. and M.Sc. in Civil Engineering (CE)
- B.Sc. in Electrical and Electronic Engineering (EEE)
- B.Sc. in Textile Engineering (TE)
- B.Sc. in Fashion Design and Technology
- Department of Natural Science (NSC)
  - Course of Mathematics
  - Course of Statistics
  - Course of Physics
  - Course of Chemistry
  - Course of History

==== Faculty of Humanities, Social Sciences & Law ====
- B.A. Hons and M.A. in English
- Bachelor of Laws (LLB Hons.)
- Master of Laws (LLM Final)
- Master of Laws (LLM Preliminary & Final)
- B.S.S (Hons.) & M.S.S (Hons.) in Broadcast & Print Journalism

==== Faculty of Business Studies and Administration ====
- Bachelor of Business Administration (BBA)
- Master of Business Administration (MBA)

==== Department of Economics ====
- B.S.S. (Hons.) in Economics
- M.S.S. in Economics (Final)

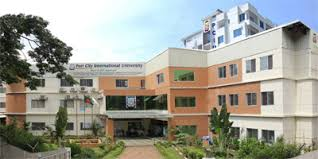
Port City International University

== Library ==
Port City International University (PCIU) Library has been developing from the very outset of its launch in 2013.
