= Chittagong District =

District of Bangladesh in Chittagong Division

Chittagong District চট্টগ্রাম জেলা
- District
- Chattogram District
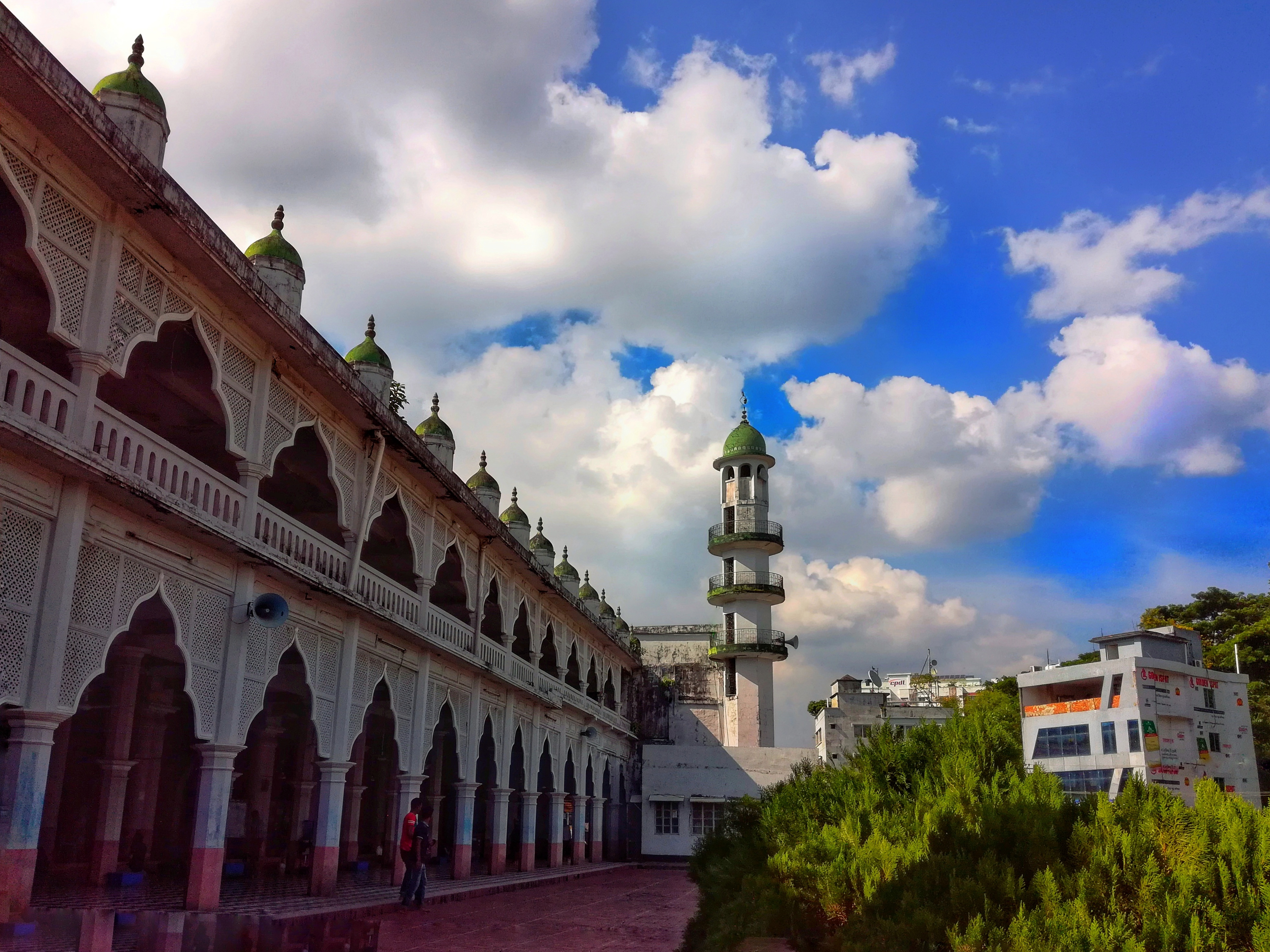
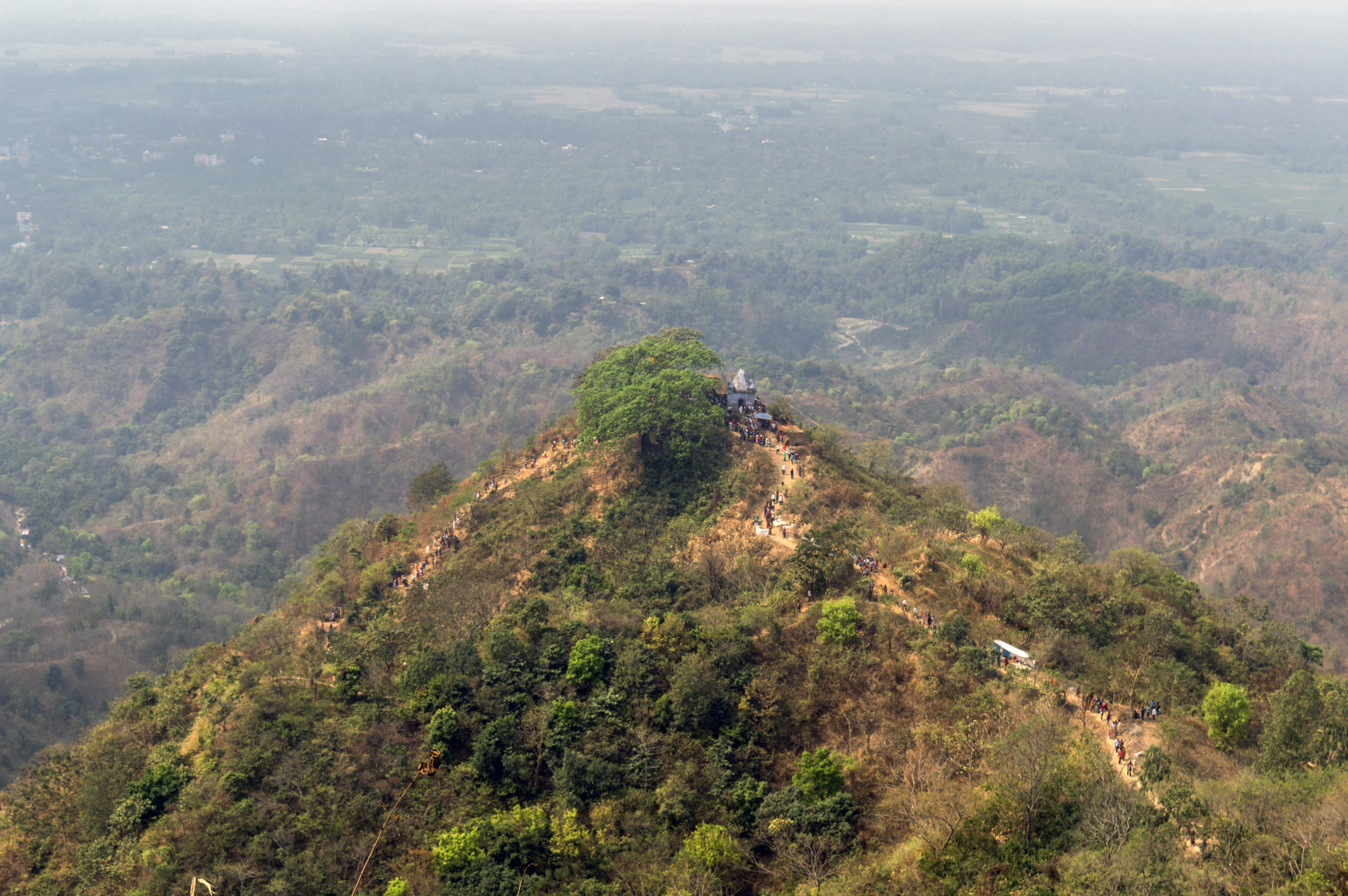
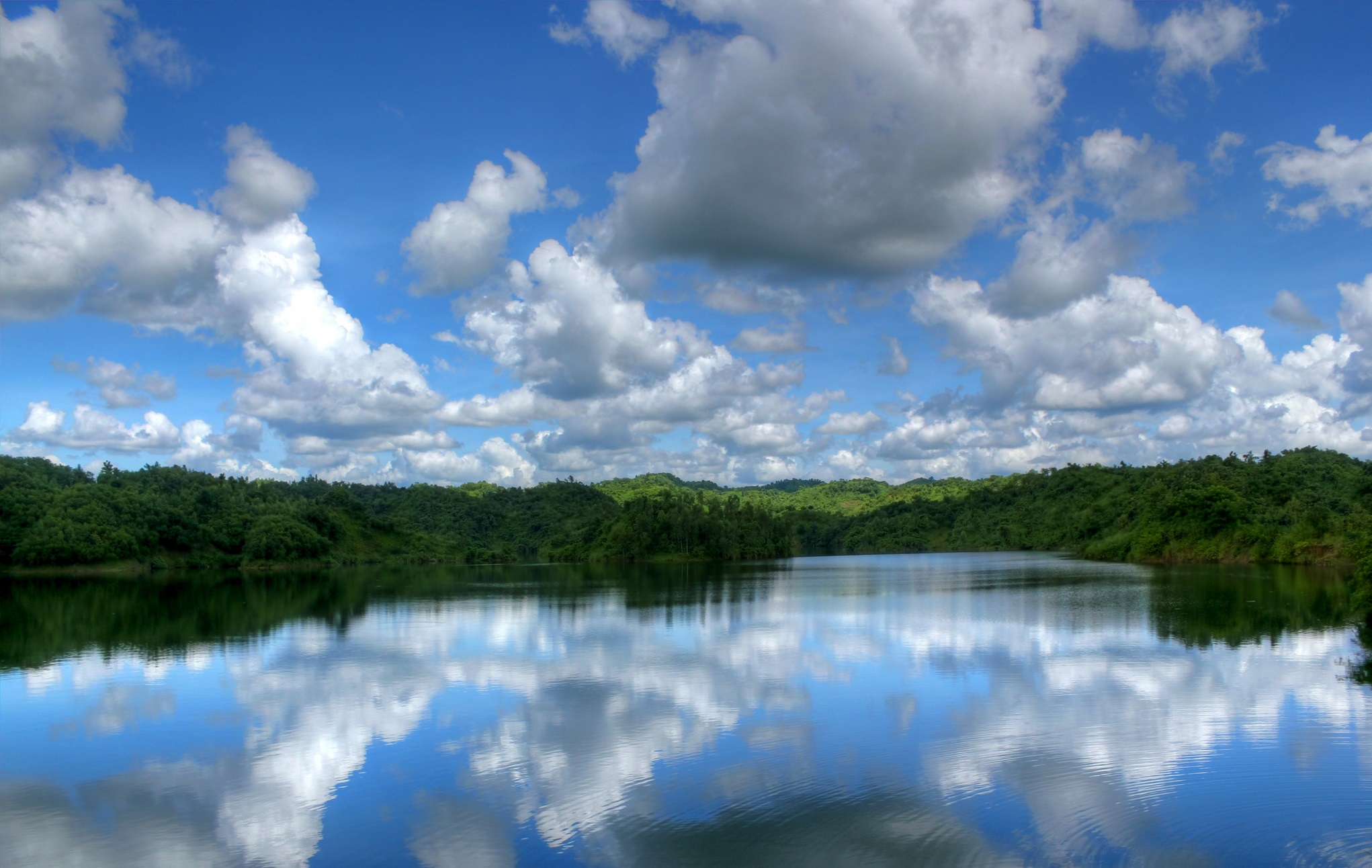
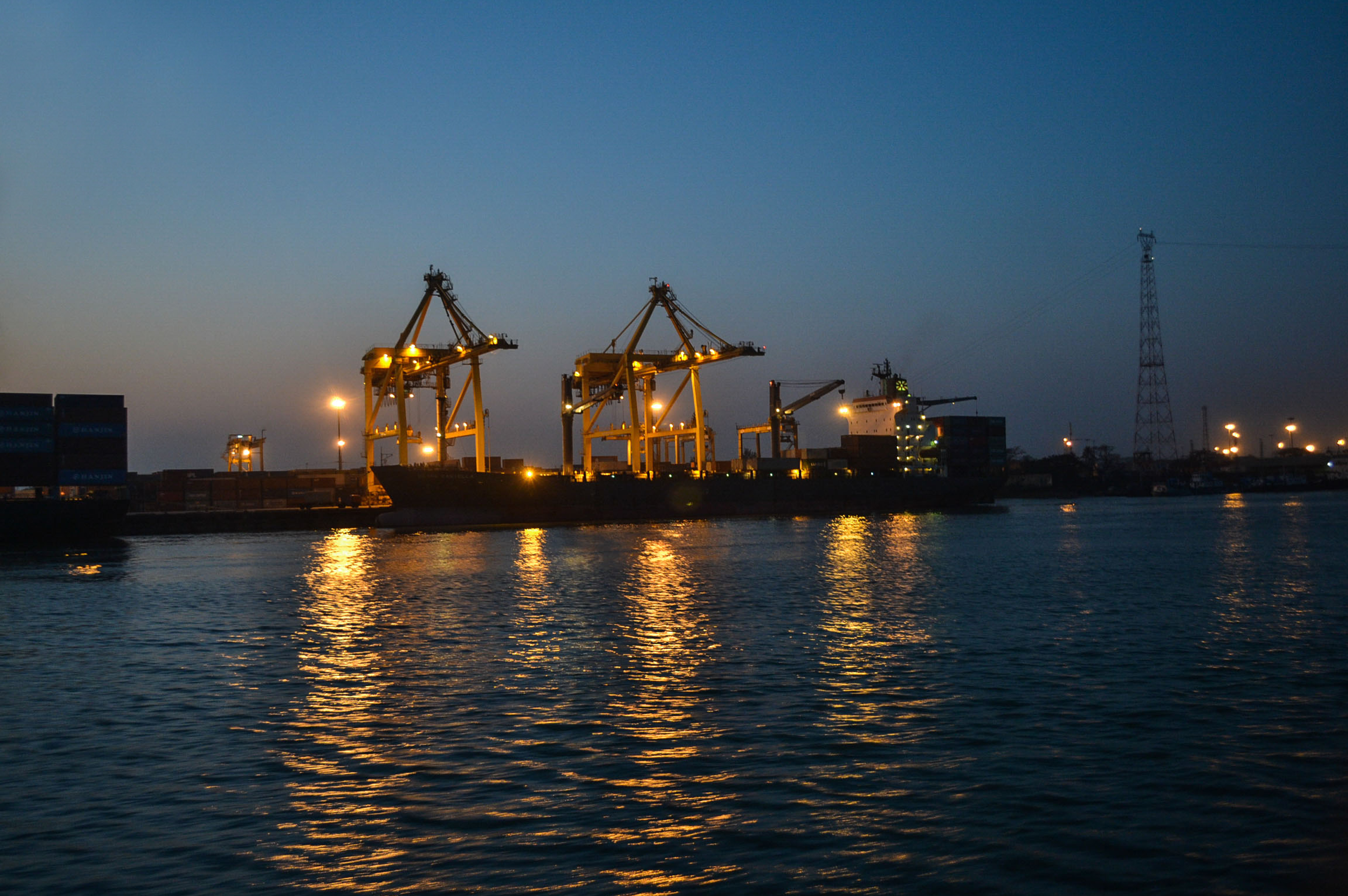
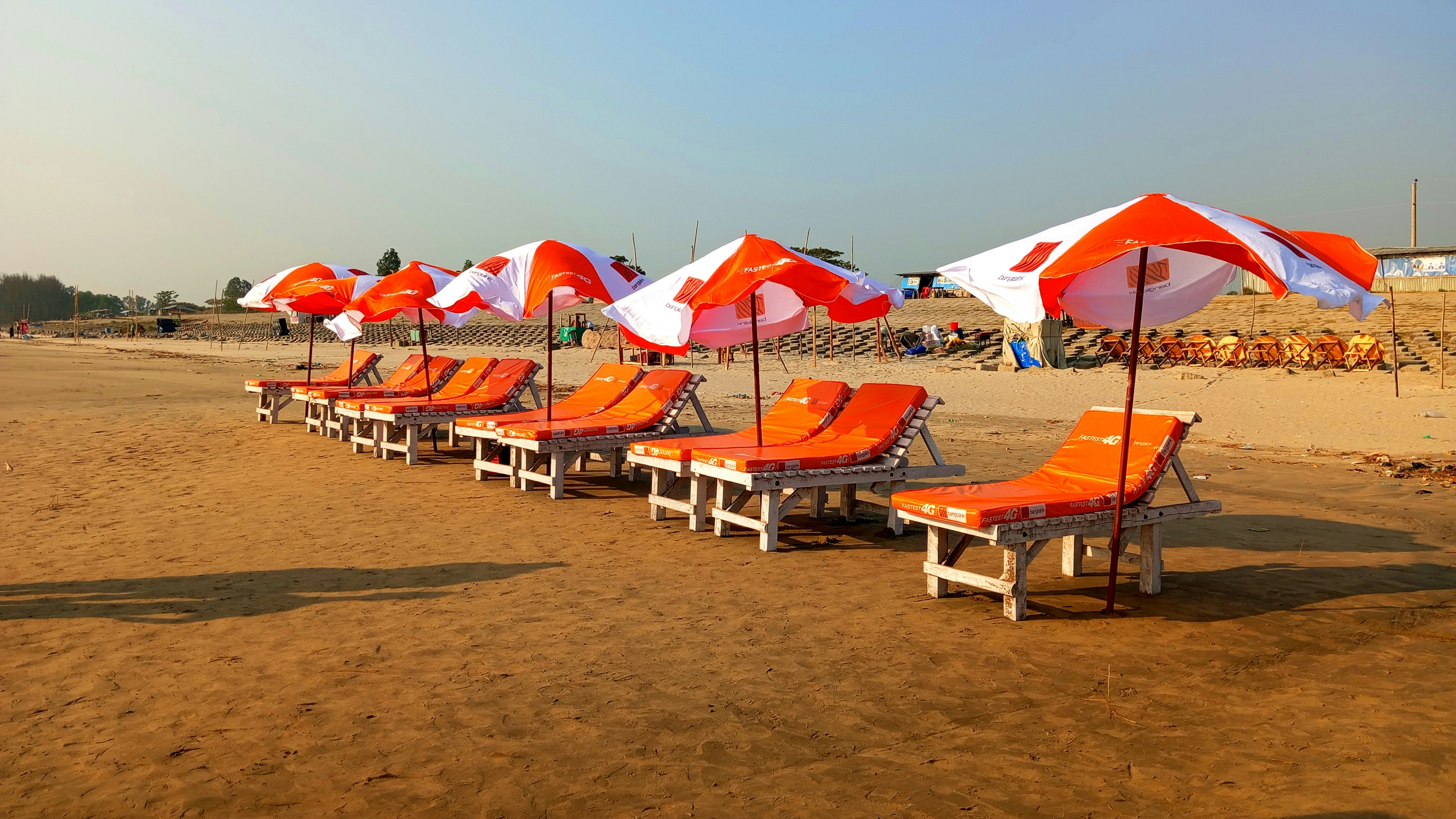
- Top to bottom: Anderkilla Shahi Jame Mosque; Chandranath Temple at Sitakunda (left) and Mahamaya Lake (right); Port of Chittagong along the Karnaphuli River; and Banshkhali Beach
- Interactive map of Chittagong District
- Coordinates: 22.3375°N 91.8389°E
- Country: Bangladesh
- Division: Chittagong Division
- Establishment: 1666; 360 years ago
- Capital: Chittagong

Government
  - Type: District Council
  - Deputy Commissioner: Farida Khanom
  - Police Superintendent: Md. Masud Alam

Area
  - Total: 5,282.92 km^{2} (2,039.75 sq mi)
  - Rank: 2nd in Bangladesh

Population (2022)
  - Total: 9,169,464
  - Rank: 2nd in Bangladesh
  - Density: 1,735.68/km^{2} (4,495.39/sq mi)
- Demonym(s): Chittagonian, Sitainga, Chatgaiya

Languages
  - Official: Bengali • English
- Time zone: UTC+06:00 (BST)
- Postal code: 4000
- Area code: 031
- ISO 3166 code: BD-10
- UN/LOCODE: BD CGP
- HDI (2019): 0.695 medium · 3rd of 20
- International Airport: Shah Amanat International Airport
- Website: chittagong.gov.bd

Chittagong District (Bengali: চট্টগ্রাম জেলা), officially Chattogram District, is a district located in south-eastern Bangladesh. It is a part of the Chittagong Division. The commercial capital of Bangladesh and the country's only two-dimensional city are both located in Chittagong District. In terms of establishment, this is the oldest district in Bangladesh, and by area, it is the second largest.

The district is also home to the second-largest sea beach in Bangladesh after Cox's Bazar, known as Banshkhali Sea Beach. In addition, the longest hanging bridge in Bangladesh is located in this district.

== Geography ==
Chittagong district is situated along the southeastern coast of Bangladesh, between the Bay of Bengal to the west, Cox's Bazar district to the south, the Chittagong Hill Tracts to the east, the Indian state of Tripura to the north and Feni district to the northwest. Within the Bay of Bengal is the island of Sandwip and several nearby islands, which together form an upazila of the district.

The district's topography is primarily defined by a series of low hill ranges running roughly parallel to the coast and with each other. Between these hill ranges are broad alluvial valleys with sandstone bedrock, and they are also divided by several major rivers, namely the Karnaphuli and Sangu. The most important of these ranges runs roughly from the tripoint with Feni district and Tripura in the north southeast to Chittagong city, known as the Sitakunda hills. This hill range is around 70 kilometres in length and its highest point, Chandranath, is around 350 metres in height. Along the eastern border with Khagrachhari district lies broken hill country. Another set of hills enters the district in the western part of Rangunia Upazila and ends at the Karnaphuli. South of the Karnaphuli, the hills run southeast through the eastern part of Patiya and Chandanaish upazilas to the Sangu River. South of the Sangu lies another hill range close to the coast which divides Banskhali Upazila from Satkania and Lohagara Upazilas, and continues into Cox's Bazar district. The southeastern border with Bandarban district lies along the foothills of the Hill Tracts. To the west of the hill ranges lies a coastal plain with a small width, and along the shore there are numerous beaches which have become tourist destinations.

=== Rivers ===
The major rivers running through Chittagong district are the Feni, Karnaphuli and Sangu.

The Feni arises in Tripura state, and forms the entire border between Tripura and Chittagong district. It separates the Sitakunda hill range from the hill ranges in Tripura to the north. After fully entering Bangladesh, it flows southwest, meandering slightly, roughly along the border between Mirsharai Upazila with Feni district before entering the Bay of Bengal amid tidal flats.

The Karnaphuli enters Chittagong district at Chandraghona in Rangunia Upazila. It goes through several large meanders and divides the Patiya hill range from the hills to their north. It flows west before turning southwest near Boalkhali and forms the southern limits of Chittagong city, entering the sea near Patenga thana. One of its main tributaries is the Halda river. The Halda arises in the Chittagong Hill tracts and flows west into Fatikchhari Upazila. It then turns southeast, flowing past Fatikchhari and Hathazari before entering the Karnaphuli near the northeasternmost part of Chittagong city.

The Sangu river arises in Bandarban district of the Chittagong Hill Tracts, and enters Chittagong district at Dhopachari in Chandanaish Upazila. It forms most of the border between Chandanaish and Satkania upazilas, as well as between Anowara and Banshkhali upazilas, before entering the sea 16 kilometres south of the mouth of the Karnaphulil.

There are several khals also in the district.

== History ==
Because of the natural harbour, Chittagong had been an important location for trade, drawing Arab traders as early as the 9th century CE. The region fell under the rule of kings from Arakan in the 16th and 17th centuries. During the 17th century, the region also faced a lot of attacks by Portuguese pirates, who occupied Sandwip for a long time. The Mughal Army under Shaista Khan conquered Chittagong in 1666 and established administration here. The district was later ceded to the British. The Chittagong Hill Tracts were separated from Chittagong in 1860. In 1947, Chittagong came under Pakistan and became part a district of East Pakistan. Port of Chittagong was a big spot for exports and imports of Pakistan. After the liberation of Bangladesh, Cox's Bazar District was separated in 1984.

== Administration ==
- Administrator of Zila Porishod: M A Salam
- Deputy Commissioner (DC): Mohammad Elius Hossain

== Subdivisions ==
Chittagong District upazila geocode map

There are 15 upazilas and 33 thanas within Chittagong District. There are 16 Thanas for the Chattogram Metropolitan Police covered area including 2 for Fatikchhari Upazila, 2 for Mirsharai Upazila, and 1 for each of the remaining 13 upazilas.

The upazilas are:

1. Mirsharai Upazila
2. Fatikchhari Upazila
3. Sandwip Upazila
4. Sitakunda Upazila
5. Hathazari Upazila
6. Raozan Upazila
7. Rangunia Upazila
8. Karnaphuli Upazila
9. Boalkhali Upazila
10. Patiya Upazila
11. Anwara Upazila
12. Chandanaish Upazila
13. Satkania Upazila
14. Banshkhali Upazila
15. Lohagara Upazila
16. Fatikchhari North Upazila An upcoming upazila be formed by dividing the existing Fatikchhari Upazila.

The thanas for the Chattogram Metropolitan Police covered area are:

1. Akbar Shah Thana
2. Bakoliya Thana
3. Bandar Thana
4. Bayazid Bostami Thana
5. Chandgaon Thana
6. Chawkbazar Thana
7. Chittagong Kotwali Thana
8. Double Mooring Thana
9. EPZ Thana
10. Halishahar Thana
11. Khulshi Thana
12. Pahartali Thana
13. Panchlaish Thana
14. Patenga Thana
15. Sadarghat Thana

The thanas for the Fatikchhari Upazila are:

1. Bhujpur Thana
2. Fatikchhari Thana

The thanas for the Mirsharai Upazila are:

1. Jorarganj Thana
2. Mirsharai Thana

== Demographics ==
According to the 2022 Census of Bangladesh, Chittagong District had 2,143,909 households and a population of 9,169,465. The population density was 1,736 people per km^{2}. 1,729,570 (18.9%) inhabitants were under 10 years of age. Chittagong District had a literacy rate (age 7 and over) of 81.1%, compared to the national average of 74.8%, and a sex ratio of 1006 females per 1000 males. Approximately, 53.3% (4,885,216) of the population lived in urban areas.

Historical population
Year	Pop.	±% p.a.
1974	3,506,150	—
1981	4,465,158	+3.51%
1991	5,296,127	+1.72%
2001	6,612,140	+2.24%
2011	7,616,352	+1.42%
2022	9,169,465	+1.70%

=== Religion ===
Religions in Chittagong District (2022)
Religion	Percent
Islam	87.53%
Hinduism	10.72%
Buddhism	1.63%
Other or not stated	0.12%

Religion in present-day Chittagong District (Note: Sadar subdivision of Chittagong district and Sandwip thana of Noakhali district)
	1941		1981		1991		2001		2011		2022	
Religion	Pop.	%	Pop.	%	Pop.	%	Pop.	%	Pop.	%	Pop.	%
Islam	1,402,130	72.49%	3,696,639	82.79%	4,444,739	83.92%	5,661,396	85.62%	6,618,657	86.90%	8,026,102	87.53%
Hinduism	470,026	24.30%	654,654	14.66%	728,596	13.76%	817,745	12.37%	861,494	11.31%	982,604	10.72%
Buddhism	—N/a	—N/a	99,556	2.23%	106,595	2.01%	118,435	1.79%	121,169	1.59%	149,775	1.63%
Others (Note: Including Jainism, Christianity, Buddhism, Zoroastrianism, Judaism, Ad-Dharmis, or not stated)	62,212	3.22%	14,309	0.32%	16,197	0.31%	14,564	0.22%	15,032	0.20%	10,984	0.12%
Total Population	1,934,368	100%	4,465,158	100%	5,296,127	100%	6,612,140	100%	7,616,352	100%	9,169,465	100%

Chittagong is multi-religious. In 2011 Muslims were 86.90%, while Hindus and Buddhists were 11.31% and 1.59% respectively. Chittagong has the largest population of Hindus of any district in Bangladesh. All religions are increasing in numbers, with Hindus and Buddhists growing more slowly.

Chittagong District has 13,148 mosques, 1025 Hindu temples, 535 Buddhist temples and 192 churches. Fakira Mosque in Hathazari, Musa Khan Mosque, Hafez Para Jame Mosque in Putibila, Lohagara, Kura Katni Mosque, Hashimpur Kadam Rasool Mosque in Chandanaish, the 16th century Kala Mosques, Chhuti Khan Mosque, Kadam Mobara Mosque, Andar Killah Mosque, Bakshi Hamid Mosque of Bashkhali, and East Gomdandi Chowdhury Para Old Mosque of Boalkhali are famous mosques in Chittagong. Also Badar Awlia Dargah is a tomb in Chittagong.

In 2011, the ethnic population was 32,165, consisting mainly of Tripuris and Chakmas. In 2022, this increased to 48,245 (0.53% of the population).

== Education ==
=== Colleges ===
- Chittagong College
- Ispahani Public School & College
- Patiya Government College
- Chittagong Cantonment Public College
- Government Hazi Mohammad Mohsin College
- Government City College, Chattogram
- Government College of Commerce, Chittagong
- Faujdarhat Cadet College
- Professor Kamal Uddin Chowdhury College

=== Universities ===
- Chittagong University
- Southern University Bangladesh
- Chittagong University of Engineering & Technology
- Chittagong Independent University
- Port City International University.
- BGC Trust University Bangladesh
- International Islamic University Chittagong
- East Delta University
- Premier University, Chittagong
- Chittagong Veterinary and Animal Sciences University
- Chittagong Medical University
- University of Science and Technology, Chittagong

=== Others ===
- Chittagong Medical College
- Chittagong Polytechnic Institute
- Textile Engineering College, Chittagong

== Language and culture ==
The official language of Chittagong is Standard Bengali. However, the main language spoken is Chittagonian, which has its own grammar, phonology and vocabulary.

== Notable people ==
- Hafez Ahmadullah
- Yahya Alampuri
- Ashish Bhadra
- Nurul Abedin
- Oli Ahmad
- Mahbubul Alam
- Mohit Ul Alam
- Ayub Bachchu
- Shyam Sundar Baishnab
- Partha Barua
- Sukomal Barua
- Abdul Karim Sahitya Bisharad
- Abdul Haq Choudhury
- Shantanu Biswas
- Sri Chinmoy
- Pramod Ranjan Choudhury
- Mehazabien Chowdhury
- Rony Chowdhury
- Salahuddin Quader Chowdhury
- Sarat Chandra Das
- Maitreyi Devi
- Charles John Stanley Gough
- Ehsanul Haque
- Enamul Haque
- Enamul Haque
- Chandra Kalindi Roy Henriksen
- Rabiul Hoque
- Somnath Hore
- Ashraful Hossain
- Nazmul Huq
- Tamim Iqbal
- Mamunul Islam
- Nasiruddin Chowdhury
- Nurul Islam
- Mirza Ahmad Ispahani
- Rubayyat Jahan
- Binoy Bashi Joldas
- Abul Kashem Khan
- Akram Khan
- Allauddin Khan
- Dawlat Wazir Bahram Khan
- Morshed Khan
- Dipa Ma
- Arman Aziz
- Anandamayi Ma
- Abdul Mannan
- Suddhananda Mahathero
- Nusrat Faria Mazhar
- Adolph Medlycott
- Minhajul Abedin
- A. B. M. Mohiuddin Chowdhury
- Moniruzzaman
- Anagarika Munindra
- Masuma Rahman Nabila
- Wasfia Nazreen
- Ayub Quadri
- Gulamur Rahman
- Minar Rahman
- Mojibur Rahman
- Mihir Rakshit
- Ramesh Shil
- Tridev Roy
- Bibi Russell
- Iftekhar Sajjad
- Blanaid Salkeld
- Anupam Sen
- Nabinchandra Sen
- Rajat Sen
- Surya Sen
- Jatindra Mohan Sengupta
- Nikhil Baran Sengupta
- Jiban Ghoshal
- Tarakeswar Dastidar
- Ahmed Sharif
- Lokman Khan Sherwani
- L. K. Siddiqi
- Shakhawat Hossain Rony
- Shahidul Alam Sohel
- Jack Stephens
- Pritilata Waddedar
- Yasir Ali
- Motiur Rahman Munna
- Monica Yunus
- Muhammad Yunus
- Zamor

== See also ==
- Chittagong
- Divisions of Bangladesh
- Cox's Bazar
- Districts of Bangladesh
- List of colleges in Sylhet
- List of people from Sylhet
- Divisions of Bangladesh
- Upazila
- Thana
