= Kazem Ali School and College =

Secondary school in Chittagong, Bangladesh

Coordinates: 22.3514°N 91.8366°E

Information
- Established: 1885; 141 years ago

Kazem Ali School and College is an educational institution in Chittagong, Bangladesh. It is situated beside Chittagong College Road near Gani Bakery.

== History ==
The school is named after Kazem Ali Master who was born 11 August 1852. He was known as "Sheikh-e-Chatgam".

In 1836 the British Government replaced the existing languages by English in the education sector. The Hindu community welcomed this while the Muslims neglected English, thinking the replacement harmful to tradition. As a result, very few Muslim students were found in the schools which led to religious discrimination between Hindu and Muslim students.

This feeling in the Muslim community made some progressive people unhappy. So, they started thinking what to do with that including Kazim Ali Master. In 1885, the "Shekh-e-Chatgam" established a school named Chittagong Middle English School. In 1886, it became a high school. After the death of Kazem Ali Master in 1926, the school was named Kazem Ali High School.

The first headmaster of the school was Nalinikanto Sen. It also opened a college in 2012.
