= Khulshi Thana =

Neighborhood in Chittagong, Bangladesh

Khulshi (Bengali: খুলশী) is an upscale residential and commercial neighbourhood and a thana located in Chittagong, Bangladesh. It falls within the administrative division of the Chattogram City Corporation.

== Demographics ==
Religions in Khulshi Thana (2022)
Religion	Percent
Islam	92.60%
Hinduism	5.43%
Buddhism	1.64%
Other or not stated	0.34%

According to the 2022 Bangladeshi census, Khulshi Thana had 50,632 households and a population of 207,795. 8.01% of the population were under 5 years of age. Khulshi had a literacy rate (age 7 and over) of 83.08%: 85.21% for males and 80.77% for females, and a sex ratio of 108.27 males for every 100 females.

According to the 2011 Bangladeshi census, the Khulshi Thana has a literacy rate is 81.06% and a population of around 207,775 as of the 2022 Population and Housing Census. The area of Khulshi Thana is 13.12 sq km.

== See also ==
- Upazilas of Bangladesh
- Districts of Bangladesh
- Divisions of Bangladesh
- Thanas of Bangladesh
- Union councils of Bangladesh
- Administrative geography of Bangladesh
- Chittagong
