= South Kattali Ward =

South Kattali দক্ষিণ কাট্টলী
- Ward
- No. 11 South Kattali Ward
- Coordinates: 22°21′N 91°46.3′E
- Country: Bangladesh
- Division: Chittagong Division
- District: Chittagong District
- Metropolis: Chittagong
- Thana: Pahartali Thana (Main area); Halishahar Thana (Partial area)
- Jatiya Sangsad constituency: Chittagong-10
- Formed: 1989; 37 years ago

Government
  - Type: Mayor–Council
  - Body: Chattogram City Corporation
  - Councillor: Vacant

Area
  - Total: 3.73 km^{2} (1.44 sq mi)

Population (2022)
  - Total: 116,578
  - Density: 31,300/km^{2} (80,900/sq mi)
- Time zone: UTC+6 (BST)
- Postal code: 4217
- Website: ccc.gov.bd

South Kattali (Bengali: দক্ষিণ কাট্টলী) is Ward No. 11 of the Chattogram City Corporation. Administratively, the ward falls mainly under Pahartali Thana, with some areas extending into Halishahar Thana within Chattogram, Bangladesh.

== Size ==
South Kattlai ward has an area of 3.73 km^{2} (1.44 sq mi).

== Population data ==
The total population of South Kattali ward is 104,455 as per 2022 Census. Of these 53,200 are males and 51,255 are females. Total families are 20,613.

== Location and boundaries ==
Chattogram City Corporation Location of South Kattali Ward in the North-West. It is bounded on the South by 26 No. North Halishahar Ward, on the east by 12 No. Saraipara Ward and 25 No. Rampur Ward, on the north by 10 No. North Kattali Ward and on the West by Bay of Bengal.

== History ==
South Kattali, historically part of the larger Kattali region on the western side of Chattogram, developed as a coastal settlement influenced by its proximity to the Bay of Bengal and the Karnaphuli river port zone. The area gradually expanded during the late 20th century as urbanization spread from the industrial belt of Pahartali and Halishahar.

The ward was formally incorporated into the administrative structure of the Chattogram City Corporation (CCC) after the city’s municipal expansion phases, which reorganized local governance into 41 wards. With increasing population growth, residential development, and the rise of small industries, South Kattali evolved into a mixed residential and semi-industrial neighborhood.

In recent decades, infrastructural improvements—including road expansion, educational institutions, and commercial centers—have contributed to the ward’s transformation. Today, South Kattali plays an important role as a link between the port-adjacent industrial zones and the northern residential areas of Chattogram.

== Councillor list ==
Election	Councillor	Party
1994	Siddique Ahmad Chowdhury	Bangladesh Awami League
2000	Sheikh Mohammad Shahjahan	Bangladesh Nationalist Party
2005	Siddique Ahmad Chowdhury	Bangladesh Awami League
2010	Morshed Aktar Chowdhury	Bangladesh Awami League
2015	Morshed Aktar Chowdhury	Bangladesh Awami League
2021	Mohammad Ismail	Bangladesh Awami League

== Election results ==
2021 Chattogram City Corporation election: South Kattali-11
Party	Candidate	Votes	%	±%
AL	Mohammad Ismail	5,514	60.12	
Independent	Morshed Aktar Chowdhury	2,276	24.81	
Independent	Khandaker Enamul Haque	693	7.56	
Majority		3,238	35.31	
Turnout		9,172	14.77	
Registered electors		62,086		
AL hold				
