= Chattogram City Corporation =

Local governing body of Chattogram, Bangladesh

Coordinates: 22.3424°N 91.8367°E

Chattogram City Corporation চট্টগ্রাম সিটি কর্পোরেশন
- Emblem of the Chattogram City Corporation

Type
- Type: City Corporation

History
- Founded: 30 September 1989; 37 years ago
- New session started: 3 November 2024

Leadership
- Mayor: Dr. Shahadat Hossain, BNP since 3 November 2024
- Deputy Mayor: Vacant since 19 August 2024
- Chief Executive Officer: Sheikh Muhammad Tauhidul Islam since 22 January 2023

Structure
- Seats: Vacant seats 55 councillors
- Length of term: Up to five years

Elections
- Voting system: First past the post
- First election: 30 January 1994
- Last election: 27 January 2021
- Next election: TBD

Meeting place
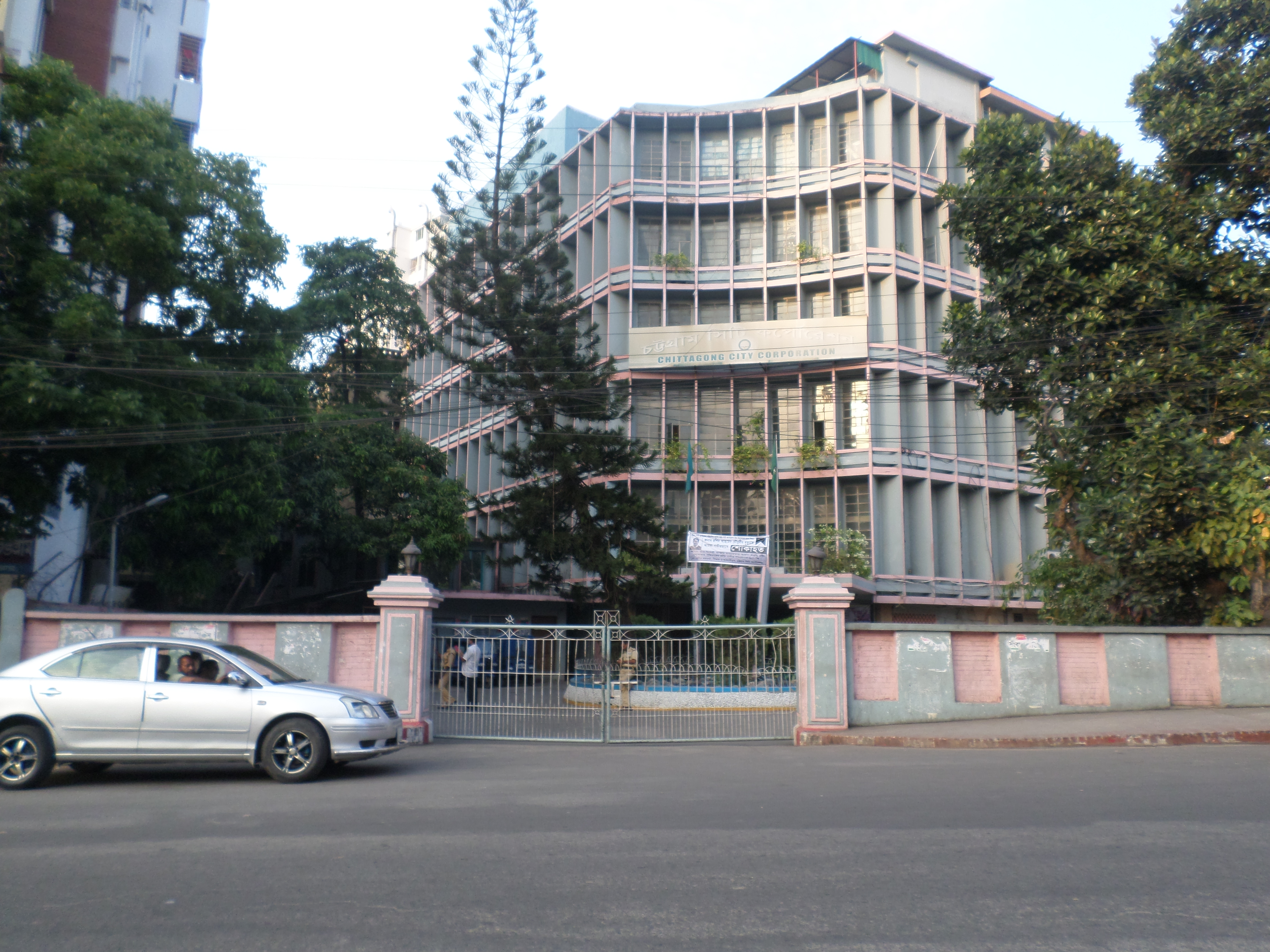
- Nagar Bhaban, Chattogram

Website
- www.ccc.gov.bd

Chattogram City Corporation (Bengali: চট্টগ্রাম সিটি কর্পোরেশন; abbreviated as CCC) is a local governing body that administers all civic services in Chattogram, the second largest city of Bangladesh. The CCC government is elected by popular vote every five years. It is headed by a mayor, who presides over 55 councillors. The City Corporation operates under provisions of The City Corporation Act, 2009.

== Administration ==
The CCC is divided into 16 thanas: Akbarshah, Bakalia, Bandar, Bayazid, Chandgaon, Double Mooring, Halishahar, Khulshi, Kotwali, Pahartali, Panchlaish, Patenga, Chawkbazar, Sadarghat, EPZ, and Karnaphuli. The thanas are subdivided into 41 wards and 211 mahallas. The CCC also administers a portion of adjoining Hathazari Upazila.

== Services ==
The CCC Government is responsible for administering and providing basic infrastructure to the city.

Departments	Services
Electricity	Maintenance of road lighting and street lamps.
Urban Planning and Development	Development and renovation of roads, drains, canals, bridges, culverts and footpaths etc.
Urban Planning and Development	Land development and city beautification.
Urban Planning and Development	Urban expansion and development of planned residential areas.
Engineering	Granting permission to cut roads for laying gas, water lines.
Engineering	Building Design Approval, Contractor Registration, Contractor Renewal, Land Demarcation Certificate.
Transportation and Communication	Urban transport system and de-congestion.
Transportation and Communication	City traffic control and parking management.
Transportation and Communication	Emergency transportation and storage of corpses.
Transportation and Communication	Construction and Management of Bus Terminals.
Transportation and Communication	Road roller hire, provision of ambulance for sick patients.
Waste Management and Cleaning	Solid waste management and street cleaning.
Waste Management and Cleaning	Clearing drains and eliminating waterlogging.
Waste Management and Cleaning	Mosquito eradication.
Health	Management of Matrisadan Hospital and General Hospital Charitable Hospital and Homeo Charitable Hospital
Health	Immunization of mothers and children, deworming and conduct of vitamin A+ campaign under EPI programme.
Health	Diploma in Midwifery Institute and Management of Health Technology.
Registrar	Registration of births/deaths and issuance of certificates.
Registrar	Issuance of nationality, inheritance and character certificates.
Education	Conducting Secondary and Higher Secondary Schools, Furkaniya Madrasas, Sanskrit Tolls and Kindergartens.
Education	Management of computer institutes and technical training institutes.
Education	Management of Adult Education and Teacher Training Centres.
Education	Conducting theater institutes for healthy development in cultural activities.
Water Supply and Sewerage	Water supply and sewerage in Chattogram city under Chattogram WASA.
Revenue	New issue/renewal of trade license, change of name and change of ownership.
Revenue	Issuance of holding number, change of number, collection of holding tax and reduction of tax, cancellation of holding name etc.
Revenue	Allotment of shops owned by the Corporation, transfer of shops, allotment of market shops, lease of huts, maintenance of fixed assets of the Corporation.
Security and Law and Order	Coordinating with concerned authorities to ensure city security.
Security and Law and Order	Installing and monitoring CCTV cameras.
Magistracy	Settlement of cases through arbitration and appellate court proceedings.
Magistracy	Mobile court to conduct anti-adulteration campaign.
Housing and Public Works	Distribution of residential plots and flats to solve the city's housing crisis.
Social Welfare	Celebration of National Days, Annual Donations.
Social Welfare	Construction of children's parks to increase children's recreational facilities.
Environmental Protection	Controlling climate pollution and tackling the effects of climate change.
Environmental Protection	Greening and establishing urban gardens and planting trees.

== Annual budget ==
Chattogram City Corporation (CCC) has announced a budget of ৳2145.42 crore (US$170 million) for 2025-2026 fiscal year.

== Ward and councillor list ==
Ward serial of CCC

#	Ward	Councillor	Party
1	South Pahartali	Vacant	TBD
2	Jalalabad	Vacant	TBD
3	Panchlaish	Vacant	TBD
4	Chandgaon	Vacant	TBD
5	Mohra	Vacant	TBD
6	East Sholashahar	Vacant	TBD
7	West Sholashahar	Vacant	TBD
8	Sholokbahar	Vacant	TBD
9	North Pahartali	Vacant	TBD
10	North Kattali	Vacant	TBD
11	South Kattali	Vacant	TBD
12	Saraipara	Vacant	TBD
13	Pahartali	Vacant	TBD
14	Lalkhan Bazar	Vacant	TBD
15	Bagmaniram	Vacant	TBD
16	Chawkbazar	Vacant	TBD
17	West Bakalia	Vacant	TBD
18	East Bakalia	Vacant	TBD
19	South Bakalia	Vacant	TBD
20	Dewan Bazar	Vacant	TBD
21	Jamal khan	Vacant	TBD
22	Enayet Bazar	Vacant	TBD
23	North Pathantooly	Vacant	TBD
24	North Agrabad	Vacant	TBD
25	Rampur	Vacant	TBD
26	North Halishahar	Vacant	TBD
27	South Agrabad	Vacant	TBD
28	Pathantooly	Vacant	TBD
29	West Madarbari	Vacant	TBD
30	East Madarbari	Vacant	TBD
31	Alkaran	Vacant	TBD
32	Andarkilla	Vacant	TBD
33	Firingee Bazar	Vacant	TBD
34	Patharghata	Vacant	TBD
35	Boxirhat	Vacant	TBD
36	Gosaildanga	Vacant	TBD
37	North Middle Halishahar	Vacant	TBD
38	South Middle Halishahar	Vacant	TBD
39	South Halishahar	Vacant	TBD
40	North Patenga	Vacant	TBD
41	South Patenga	Vacant	TBD
Reserved Women's Councillor
42	Reserved women's seat-1	Vacant	TBD
43	Reserved women's seat-2	Vacant	TBD
44	Reserved women's seat-3	Vacant	TBD
45	Reserved women's seat-4	Vacant	TBD
46	Reserved women's seat-5	Vacant	TBD
47	Reserved women's seat-6	Vacant	TBD
48	Reserved women's seat-7	Vacant	TBD
49	Reserved women's seat-8	Vacant	TBD
50	Reserved women's seat-9	Vacant	TBD
51	Reserved women's seat-10	Vacant	TBD
52	Reserved women's seat-11	Vacant	TBD
53	Reserved women's seat-12	Vacant	TBD
54	Reserved women's seat-13	Vacant	TBD
55	Reserved women's seat-14	Vacant	TBD

== Deputy mayor ==
The deputy mayor (also known as Panel mayor) is a second-ranking official of city corporation. 3 Panel mayors are appointed from the council member to assist the mayor through voting. The 1st panel mayor with the highest number of votes is appointed as deputy mayor or acting mayor. In the absence of the mayor, the deputy mayor controls all functions of the City Corporation. Other 2 Panel mayors also assist mayor and to oversee major offices within the executive branch of the CCC.

Serial No.	Post	Name
01	Panel Mayor 1	Vacant
02	Panel Mayor 2	Vacant
03	Panel Mayor 3	Vacant

== List of mayors ==
Status

Acting Mayor and Administrator

No.	Portrait	Name (Birth–Death)	Election	Term of office			Political party	Reference
No.	Portrait	Name (Birth–Death)	Election	Took office	Left office	Time in office	Political party	Reference
1		Mahmudul Islam Chowdhury	–	30 September 1989	4 December 1990	1 year, 65 days	Jatiya Party (Ershad)	
–		M. A. Bari (Divisional Commissioner)	–	13 December 1990	11 May 1991	149 days	Independent	
2		Mir Mohammad Nasiruddin	–	12 May 1991	20 December 1993	2 years, 222 days	Bangladesh Nationalist Party	
–		Omar Farooq (Divisional Commissioner)	–	21 December 1993	10 March 1994	79 days	Independent	
3		A. B. M. Mohiuddin Chowdhury (1944–2017)	1994; 2000; 2005	11 March 1994	29 March 2007	13 years, 18 days	Bangladesh Awami League	
—		M. Manjur Alam (Acting Mayor)	—	29 March 2007	4 September 2008	1 year, 159 days	Bangladesh Awami League	
3		A. B. M. Mohiuddin Chowdhury (1944–2017)	—	4 September 2008	1 February 2010	1 year, 150 days	Bangladesh Awami League	
4		M. Manjur Alam	2010	10 June 2010	6 May 2015	4 years, 330 days	Bangladesh Nationalist Party	
5		A. J. M. Nasir Uddin	2015	7 May 2015	4 August 2020	5 years, 89 days	Bangladesh Awami League	
–		Mohammed Khorshed Alam Sujon (Administrator)	–	5 August 2020	6 February 2021	185 days	Bangladesh Awami League	
6		Rezaul Karim Chowdhury	2021	15 February 2021	19 August 2024	3 years, 217 days	Bangladesh Awami League	
–		Md. Tofayel Islam (Administrator)	–	19 August 2024	3 November 2024	76 days	Independent	
7		Shahadat Hossain	–	3 November 2024	Present	2 years, 10 days	Bangladesh Nationalist Party	

== Elections ==
=== Election result 2021 ===
Chattogram Mayoral Election 2021
Party	Candidate	Votes	%	±%
AL	Rezaul Karim Chowdhury	3,69,248	84.79	N/A
BNP	Dr. Shahadat Hossain	52,489	12.05	N/A
IAB	Md. Jannatul Islam	4,980	1.14	N/A
BIF	M.A Matin	2,126	0.49	N/A
Islamic Front	Muhammad Waheed Murad	1,109	0.25	N/A
Majority		3,16,759	72.74	
Turnout		4,36,543	22.52	
Registered electors		19,38,706		
AL hold				

=== Election result 2015 ===
Chattogram Mayoral Election 2015
Party	Candidate	Votes	%	±%
AL	A J M Nasir Uddin	4,75,361	57.87	N/A
BNP	M. Manjur Alam	3,04,837	37.11	N/A
BIF	M.A Mannan	11,655	1.42	N/A
IAB	Wazed Hossain	9,868	1.18	N/A
JP(E)	Solayman Alam Sheth	6,131	0.75	N/A
Majority		1,70,524	20.76	
Turnout		8,68,664	47.90	
Registered electors		18,13,600		
AL gain from BNP				

=== Election result 2010 ===
Chattogram Mayoral Election 2010
Party	Candidate	Votes	%	±%
BNP	M. Manjur Alam	4,79,145	54.20	N/A
AL	A. B. M. Mohiuddin Chowdhury	3,83,617	43.40	N/A
Independent	Mofazzal Hossain	8,813	1.00	N/A
IAB	Rafiq Islam	6,521	0.74	N/A
JP(E)	Solayman Alam Sheth	2,083	0.24	N/A
Majority		95,528	10.8	
Turnout		8,85,065	52.25	
Registered electors		16,93,954		
BNP gain from AL				

=== Election result 2005 ===
Chattogram Mayoral Election 2005
Party	Candidate	Votes	%	±%
AL	A. B. M. Mohiuddin Chowdhury	3,50,891		N/A
BNP	Mir Mohammad Nasiruddin	2,59,410		N/A
Majority		91,481		
Turnout		6,10,301		
AL hold				

== List of wards by thana/upazila ==
- Hathazari Upazila: Ward No. 01 (part)
- Bayazid: Ward No. 02
- Chandgaon: Ward No. 04, 05, 06
- Panchlaish: Ward No. 01 (part), 02, 03, 07, 08 (part), 15 (part), 16 (part)
- Akbarsha: Ward No. 10
- Pahartali: Ward No. 09 (part), 11 (part), 12 (part)
- Khulshi: Ward No. 08 (part), 09 (part), 13, 14
- Bakoliya: Ward No. 17, 18, 19, 35 (part)
- Kotwali: Ward No. 20, 21, 22, 30 (part), 31, 32, 33, 34, 35 (part), 15 (part), 16 (part)
- Halishahar - Ward No. 11 (part), 24 (part), 25, 26
- Double Mooring: Ward No.12 (part), 23, 24 (part), 27, 28, 29, 30 (part), 36 (part)
- Bandar: Ward No. 36 (part), 37, 38, 39 (part)
- Patenga: Ward No. 39 (part), 40, 41
