= 2021 Chattogram City Corporation election =

Mayoral election in Bangladesh

- 27 January 2021
- Registered: 1,938,706 (▲6.91 pp)
- Turnout: 22.52% (▼25.38 pp)
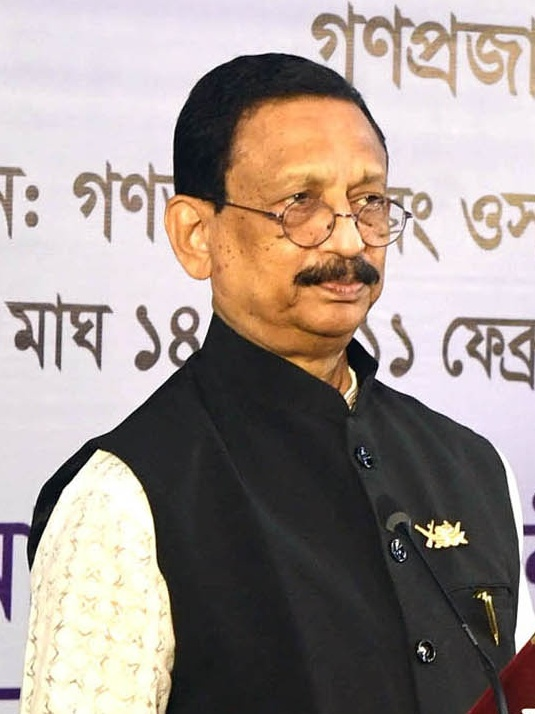

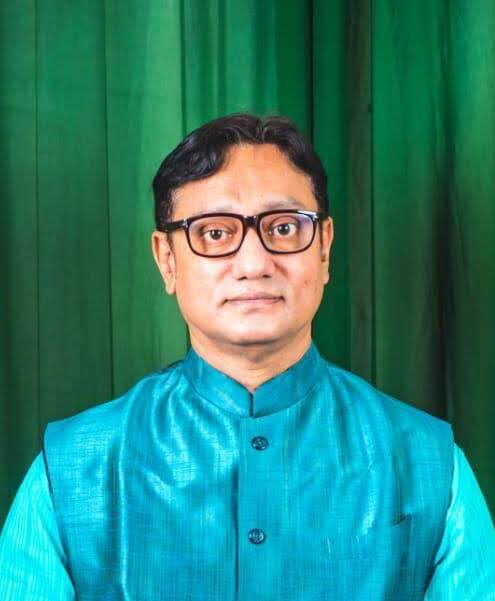
	First party	Second party
Candidate	Rezaul Karim Chowdhury	Dr. Shahadat Hossain
Party	AL	BNP
Popular vote	369,248	52,489
Percentage	84.79%	12.05%
Swing	▲26.92pp	▼25.06pp
Mayor before election
A. J. M. Nasir Uddin
AL
Elected Mayor
Rezaul Karim Chowdhury
AL
- Council election
- 27 January 2021; 55 seats in the Chattogram City Corporation (Note: Of the total 54 seats, one was won uncontested.); 28 February 2021 (Re-election in 1 seat)
Party	Leader	Seats	+/–
AL	Rezaul Karim Chowdhury	42	−4
BNP	Dr. Shahadat Hossain	0	−7
Jamaat	Didn't contest	0	−2
Independent	—	13	+13
This lists parties that won seats. See the complete results below.

The 2021 Chattogram City Corporation election was a local government election in the city of Chattogram, Bangladesh, held on 27 January 2021 to elect the Mayor of Chittagong and the Chittagong City Council. The election resulted in a victory for the Awami League candidate Rezaul Karim Chowdhury. In the 55 member City Council, the Awami League won 42 seats, while the Independents won 13 seats. However, the results were rejected by the main opposition candidate, Dr. Shahadat Hossain of the Bangladesh Nationalist Party. This election was marred by violence and it was not seen as a free, fair and credible election. Later in 2024, after ruling Awami League regime fell, vote rigging by Awami League was confirmed in this election.

== Background ==
The Chattogram City Corporation (CCC) is the governing body responsible for the administration of Chattogram, the second-largest city in Bangladesh. The term of the previous mayor, A. J. M. Nasir Uddin, elected in 2015, ended in 2020. The election was originally scheduled to take place in March 2020 but was postponed due to the COVID-19 pandemic.

== Campaign ==
The 2021 Chattogram City Corporation (CCC) election featured major political parties focusing on urban governance, port-city infrastructure, and long-standing civic problems. Key themes included waterlogging, traffic congestion, corruption allegations, waste management, and improvement of basic municipal services.

=== Awami League ===
The ruling Bangladesh Awami League nominated Rezaul Karim Chowdhury as its mayoral candidate. His campaign highlighted commitments to resolving the chronic waterlogging problem through canal restoration projects, expansion of drainage networks, and coordination with the Chittagong Development Authority (CDA). Rezaul also pledged improved road repairs, digitalization of civic services, efficient waste collection, and strong measures to curb corruption in municipal contracting.

=== Bangladesh Nationalist Party (BNP) ===
The Bangladesh Nationalist Party nominated Dr. Shahadat Hossain as its mayoral candidate. Shahadat's campaign emphasized mismanagement, irregularities, and corruption allegations within the previous CCC administration. He promised transparent city governance, modern waste-management systems, proper maintenance of roads and footpaths, and solutions to traffic congestion and disorderly urban growth. His manifesto also focused on public health, dengue prevention, clean water supply, and restoring public trust in municipal operations.

=== Other issues ===
Residents across Chattogram raised a number of recurring concerns, including:

- severe waterlogging during monsoon due to clogged drains and encroached canals
- chronic traffic congestion in key commercial corridors
- irregular waste collection and lack of modern disposal facilities
- damaged roads, footpaths, and poor street lighting in many wards
- environmental degradation, hill-cutting, and loss of open spaces
- lack of coordination between CCC, CDA, and WDB, causing delays in major projects

=== Election environment ===
Voting was held using Electronic Voting Machines (EVM) in all centers. National observers noted a generally peaceful environment, although turnout remained modest. Public concerns over service delivery, transparency, and infrastructure sustainability heavily shaped the overall campaign narrative.

== Candidates ==
The election was mainly contested between candidates of the two major political parties in Bangladesh:

List of mayoral candidates
Party	Flag	Symbol	Candidates
Bangladesh Awami League			Rezaul Karim Chowdhury
Bangladesh Nationalist Party			Dr. Shahadat Hossain

Other minor candidates from smaller parties and independent candidates also participated.

Ward		Bangladesh Awami League		Bangladesh Nationalist Party	
1	South Pahartali	AL	Gazi Md. Shafiul Azim	BNP	Sirajul Islam Rashed
2	Jalalabad	AL	Mohammad Ibrahim	BNP	Md. Yakub Chowdhury
3	Panchlaish	AL	Kofil Uddin Khan	BNP	Mohammad Elias
4	Chandgaon	AL	Md. Saifuddin Khaled	BNP	Mahabubul Alam
5	Mohra	AL	Mohammad Kazi Nurul Amin	BNP	Mohammad Azam
6	East Sholashahar	AL	M Ashraful Alam	BNP	Hasan Liton
7	West Sholashahar	AL	Md. Mobarak Ali	BNP	Iskandar Mirza
8	Sholokbahar	AL	Md. Morshed Alam	BNP	Hasan Chowdhury
9	North Pahartali	AL	Nurul Absar Mia	BNP	Abdus Sattar Salim
10	North Kattali	AL	Nishar Uddin Ahmed	BNP	Rafiq Uddin Chowdhury
11	South Kattali	AL	Mohammad Ismail	BNP	Sohrab Hossain Chowdhury
12	Saraipara	AL	Md. Nurul Amin	BNP	Shamsul Alam
13	Pahartali	AL	Md. Wasim Uddin Chowdhury	BNP	Jahangir Alam Dulal
14	Lalkhan Bazar	AL	Abul Hasnat Md. Belal	BNP	Abdul Halim
15	Bagmaniram	AL	Mohammad Gias Uddin	BNP	Chowdhury Saifuddin Rashed Siddiqui
16	Chawkbazar	AL	Syed Golam Haider Mintu	BNP	AKM Salahuddin Kausar Labu
17	West Bakalia	AL	Mohammad Shahidul Alam	BNP	AKM Ariful Islam
18	East Bakalia	AL	Mohammad Harun or Rashid	BNP	Mohammad Mohiuddin
19	South Bakalia	AL	Md. Nurul Alam	BNP	Yasin Chowdhury
20	Dewan Bazar	AL	Chowdhury Hasan Mahmud Hasni	BNP	Hafizul Islam Majumdar Milon
21	Jamal khan	AL	Shaibal Das Sumon	BNP	Abu Md. Mohsin Chowdhury
22	Enayet Bazar	AL	Mohammad Salim Ullah	BNP	M.A. Malek
23	North Pathantooly	AL	Mohammad Javed	BNP	Mohammad Mohsin
24	North Agrabad	AL	Nazmul Haque Duke	BNP	SM Faridul Alam
25	Rampur	AL	Abdus Sabur Liton	BNP	Shahid Md. Chowdhury
26	North Halishahar	AL	Mohammad Hossain	BNP	Md. Abul Hashem
27	South Agrabad	AL	Md. Sheikh Zafrul Haider Chowdhury	BNP	Mohammad Sekandar
28	Pathantooly	AL	Nazrul Islam Bahadur	BNP	SM Jamal Uddin Jasim
29	West Madarbari	AL	Golam Mohammad Zobair	BNP	Md. Salah Uddin
30	East Madarbari	AL	Ataullah Chowdhury	BNP	Habibur Rahman
31	Alkaran	AL	Md. Abdus Salam	BNP	Didarur Rahman Labu
32	Andarkilla	AL	Jahar Lal Hazari	BNP	Syed Abul Basar
33	Firingee Bazar	AL	Mohammad Salahuddin	BNP	Aktar Khan
34	Patharghata	AL	Pulak Khastagir	BNP	Ismail Bali
35	Boxirhat	AL	Haji Nurul Haque	BNP	Advocate Tariq Ahmad
36	Gosaildanga	AL	Jahangir Alam Chowdhury	BNP	Mohammad Harun (Doc)
37	North Middle Halishahar	AL	Md. Hossain Murad	BNP	Mohammad Osman
38	South Middle Halishahar	AL	Golam Md. Chowdhury	BNP	Hanif Saudagar
39	South Halishahar	AL	Ziaul Haque Sumon	BNP	Sarfraz Quader
40	North Patenga	AL	Abdul Barek	BNP	Mohammad Harun
41	South Patenga	AL	Saleh Ahmad Chowdhury	BNP	Md. Nurul Afshar
Reserved Women's Councillor
42	Reserved women's seat-1	AL	Syeda Kashpia Nahrin	BNP	Roksana Begum
43	Reserved women's seat-2	AL	Zobaira Nargis Khan	BNP	Shahenewaz Chowdhury Minu
44	Reserved women's seat-3	AL	Zohra Begum	BNP	Jinnatun Nesha Jinu
45	Reserved women's seat-4	AL	Tashlima Begum Nurjahan	BNP	Sakina Begum
46	Reserved women's seat-5	AL	Shiuli Dey	BNP	Monoara Begum Moni
47	Reserved women's seat-6	AL	Shaheen Akhtar Rozi	BNP	Mahmuda Sultana Jharna
48	Reserved women's seat-7	AL	Rumki Sengupta	BNP	Advocate Parveen Akhter Chowdhury
49	Reserved women's seat-8	AL	Neelu Nag	BNP	Arjun Nahar Manna
50	Reserved women's seat-9	AL	Noor Akhtar Prama	BNP	Khaleda Borhan
51	Reserved women's seat-10	AL	Hoore Ara Begum	BNP	Jasmina Khanom
52	Reserved women's seat-11	AL	Jinnat Ara Begum	BNP	Kamrun Nahar Liza
53	Reserved women's seat-12	AL	Afroza Zahoor	BNP	Sahida Khanom
54	Reserved women's seat-13	AL	Lutfunnesa Dobash Baby	BNP	Monoara Begum
55	Reserved women's seat-14	AL	Shahanur Begum	BNP	Zahida Hossain

== Timeline ==
Poll Event	Schedule
Official declaration from the Election Commission	14 December 2020
Declaration of the schedule	14 December 2020
Application deadline for candidates	30 December 2020
Scrutiny of nomination	2 January 2021
Last date for withdrawal of nomination	7 January 2021
Symbol allocation	8 January 2021
Start of campaign period	8 January 2021
End of campaign period	25 January 2021
Date of poll	27 January 2021
Date of counting of votes	27 January 2021

== Electoral system ==
The election was conducted using electronic voting machines (EVMs) in all 735 polling stations in the city. Around 1.92 million voters were registered to cast their vote. This was one of the first large-scale uses of EVMs in local elections in Bangladesh, a move that was both praised and criticized by various political parties.

The corporation area is divided into 41 wards. The corporation elects:

- Mayor, directly elected by the voters of Chattogram.
- 41 Ward Councillors, one from each ward, elected directly.
- 14 Reserved Women Councillors, elected from groups of three wards.

== Mayoral election results ==
The results were announced later in the evening on 27 January 2021. Rezaul Karim Chowdhury, the Awami League candidate, won the mayoral race by a wide margin, receiving approximately 369,248 votes, while Shahadat Hossain of the BNP garnered 52,489 votes.

Rezaul Karim Chowdhury succeeded A. J. M. Nasir Uddin as mayor of Chattogram. The Awami League also secured the majority of the councilor positions in the 41 wards of the Chattogram City Corporation.

Candidate	Party	Votes	%
Rezaul Karim Chowdhury	Bangladesh Awami League	369,248	84.79
Dr. Shahadat Hossain	Bangladesh Nationalist Party	52,489	12.05
Md. Jannatul Islam	Islami Andolan Bangladesh	4,980	1.14
Abul Manzoor	National People's Party	4,653	1.07
M A Matin	Bangladesh Islami Front	2,126	0.49
Muhammad Waheed Murad	Islamic Front Bangladesh	1,109	0.25
Khokon Chowdhury	Independent	885	0.20
Total		435,490	100.00
Valid votes		435,490	99.76
Invalid/blank votes		1,053	0.24
Total votes		436,543	100.00
Registered voters/turnout		1,938,706	22.52
Bangladesh Awami League hold			

== Council election results ==
=== Party-wise ===
2021 CCC council election results (party-wise)
Party	Leader	Councilor contested seats	Councilor elected in Seats	Ward Councilors	Reserved Women Councilors
Bangladesh Awami League	Rezaul Karim Chowdhury	55	42 / 55	33	9
Independent	unknown		13 / 55	8	5
Total			55	41	14

== Violence ==
The election day was marked by reports of violence in multiple wards across the city. Several clashes were reported between supporters of the ruling Awami League and the opposition BNP. In one such incident, a polling agent of a BNP-backed councilor candidate was killed, prompting further criticism of the law enforcement agencies and the fairness of the electoral process.

According to local media reports, around 20 people were injured in election-related violence, and allegations of vote rigging and irregularities were rampant. Despite these issues, the Election Commission of Bangladesh declared the election successful and largely peaceful.

== Aftermath and Reactions ==
After the Chattogram City Corporation Election of 2021, reactions were deeply divided. The ruling party, the Awami League (AL), celebrated the victory of their candidate, Rezaul Karim Chowdhury. They claimed that the election had been conducted fairly and that the result represented the will of the people of Chattogram. Rezaul Karim, in his post-election statements, promised to continue the development projects started by the previous mayor, A. J. M. Nasir Uddin.

On the other hand, the opposition, particularly the Bangladesh Nationalist Party (BNP), rejected the election results outright. They accused the Awami League of voter suppression, vote rigging, and using law enforcement to intimidate opposition supporters. Shahadat Hossain, the BNP candidate, demanded an investigation into the alleged irregularities and called for the election results to be annulled. The BNP also organized protests, claiming that the use of electronic voting machines (EVMs) had made it easier to manipulate the results in favor of the ruling party. Shahadat Hossain's call for investigation was rejected and Rezaul Karim Chowdhury was sworn in as the 6th Mayor of Chattogram City Corporation on 11 February 2021. Rezaul Karim couldn't fulfill his term as Sheikh Hasina's regime fell in 2024 amid mass protests. On 19 August, Rezaul Karim Chowdhury, along with the mayors of other city corporations, was removed from his position and replaced by the Divisional Commissioners.
