= Chattogram City Corporation Public Library =

Library in Chattogram, Bangladesh

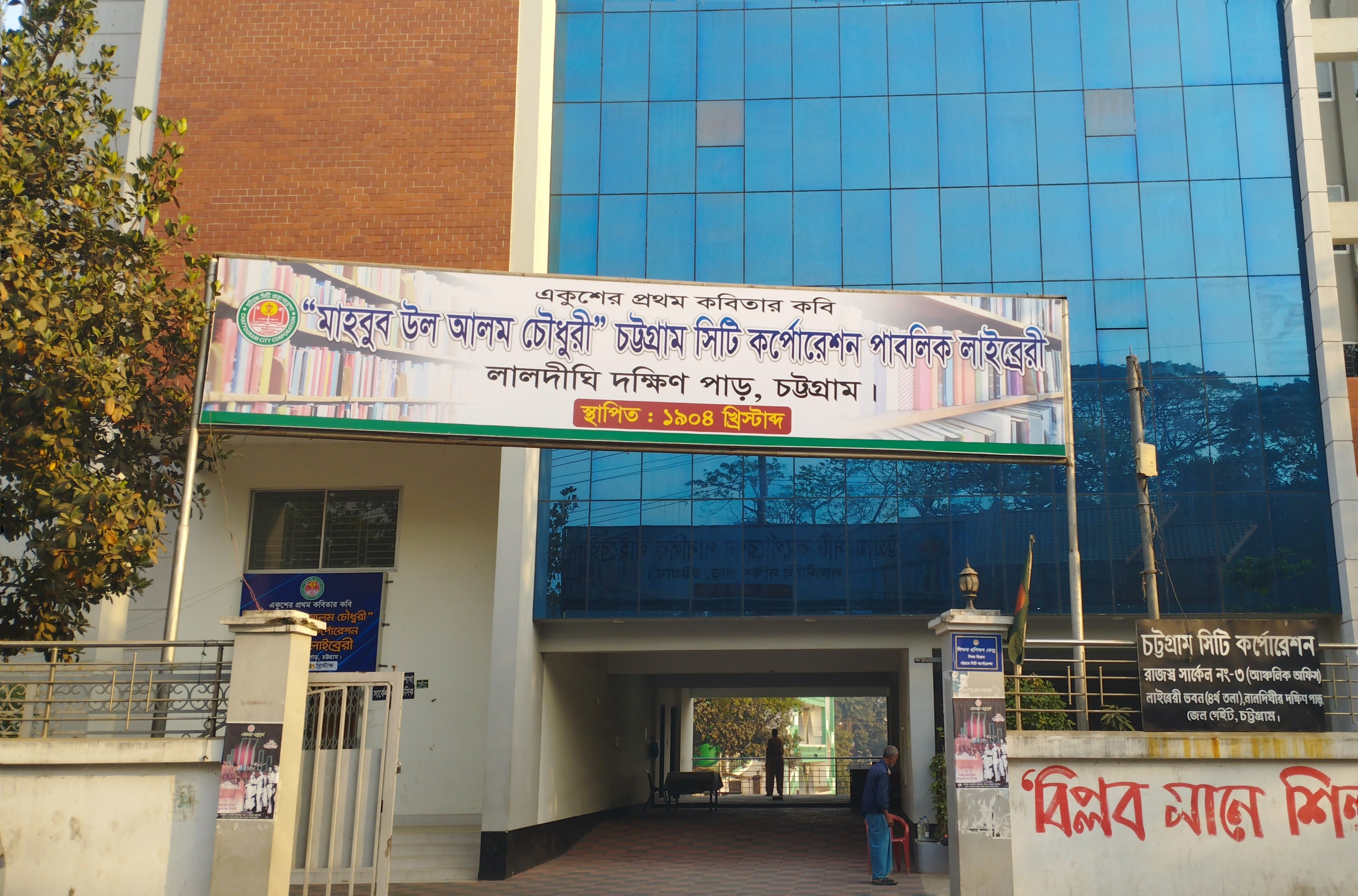
- Formation: 1904; 122 years ago
- Founder: Chittagong Municipality
- Type: Library
- Legal status: Public Library
- Headquarters: Chattogram, Bangladesh
- Location: 1, Jail Road, South bank of Lal Dighi, Chattogram 4000
- Coordinates: 22.3374°N 91.8378°E
- Region served: Bangladesh
- Official language: Bengali
- Parent organization: Chattogram City Corporation

Chattogram City Corporation Public Library (Bengali: চট্টগ্রাম সিটি কর্পোরেশন পাবলিক লাইব্রেরি) (Officially: Mahbub Ul Alam Choudhury Chattogram City Corporation Public Library (Bengali: মাহবুব উল আলম চৌধুরী চট্টগ্রাম সিটি কর্পোরেশন পাবলিক লাইব্রেরি) is the first public library in Chattogram. Currently, the Chittagong City Corporation is responsible for managing it. The library was renamed "Mahbub ul Alam Chowdhury" Chittagong City Corporation Public Library in 2023, after Mahbub Ul Alam Choudhury, the poet of the first poem of Ekushey.

== Location ==
The Chattogram City Corporation Public Library is located on the 5th and 6th floors of a newly constructed multi-storey building on the southern bank of the historic Laldighi of Chattogram city. Next to it are the Chattogram Central Jail and Laldighi Maidan.

== History ==
The library was established on June 8, 1904, in the first building of the Chittagong Municipality, under the name Chittagong Municipal Library. The building was built even before the establishment of the library in 1858. At that time, it was used as the office of the District Magistrate. When the Chittagong Municipal Committee was formed on 22 June 1863, the building began to be used as its office. Later, in 1904, the Chittagong Municipality was shifted to Andarkilla and the library was established there. At that time, the British Council Library was located on its ground floor. In 1921–1922, the then Chairman of Chittagong Municipality, Nur Ahmed, took the initiative to expand the library. Finally, in 1923, the Chittagong City Corporation Public Library was shifted from Andarkilla to its present location on the banks of Laldighi.

After the independence of Bangladesh, the name of Chittagong Municipal Library was changed to Chattogram City Corporation Public Library. In 2018 when Govt change the city name from Chittagong to Chattogram. It also effective with this library name.

In 2017, the century-old and historic three-storey building of the Chattogram City Corporation Public Library was demolished. As a result, all the books and other materials of the library were transferred to the Urban Health Complex in Bibirhat of the city. Where, the books were stored in 900 bags on the 3rd floor of the building. Under the 'Re-construction of Laldighi Central Disaster Management Control Office Library and Community cum Cyclone Shelter' project, the Ministry of Housing and Public Works took the initiative to construct a new building at a cost of about 15 crore taka with JICA funding. After the completion of the construction work in 2020, Professor Anupam Sen inaugurated the new 8-storey building on 14 December. During the tenure of former City Corporation Administrator Khorshed Alam Sujon, the 5th and 6th floors of the building were allocated for the library in 2020 and the public library is currently operating here. The size of each floor of the library is 4,000 square feet. It is worth noting that the ground floor of the multi-storey building has been allocated for car parking, the second floor for a conference room, the third floor for a cyclone shelter, the fourth floor for a teacher training center, the seventh floor for the sports XI office, and the eighth floor for a rest house. In 2021, during the COVID-19 pandemic, a 50-bed isolation center was built on the second and third floors of the building.

== Collection ==
At one time, the Chattogram City Corporation Public Library had a collection of about 45,000 books. In addition, it had a collection of several hundred-year-old books of Bengali-English literature, gadgets, periodicals, newspapers, patents published from Kolkata, and various documents of the British era. Here is the first edition of Romeo and Juliet written by William Shakespeare in ancient paintings. In addition to two books that are three and a half centuries old, the library has a collection of more than three hundred books that are centuries old.

Later, educational institutions took books from here at different times. In 2017, for the sake of rebuilding the library building, books and other newspapers, magazines, gadgets and periodicals were transferred to the third floor of the Urban Health Complex in Bibirhat, Chattogram. Where, due to being kept in sacks, various old books were damaged. In 2020, the library resumed its activities in the new building. The library also has a gallery with photographs, biographies and works of various important people of Chattogram.
