= Rampur Ward =

Rampur রামপুর
- Ward
- No. 25 Rampur Ward
- Coordinates: 22°20.4′N 91°47.7′E
- Country: Bangladesh
- Division: Chittagong Division
- District: Chittagong District
- Metropolis: Chittagong
- Thana: Halishahar
- Jatiya Sangsad constituency: Chittagong-10

Government
  - Type: Mayor–Council
  - Body: Chattogram City Corporation
  - Councillor: Vacant

Area
  - Total: 1.81 km^{2} (0.70 sq mi)

Population (2022)
  - Total: 62,756
  - Density: 34,700/km^{2} (89,800/sq mi)
- Time zone: UTC+6 (BST)
- Postal code: 4224
- Website: ccc.gov.bd

Rampur (Bengali: রামপুর) is the No. 25 Ward of Chattogram City Corporation and a part of Halishahar Thana, Bangladesh.

== Size ==
Rampur Ward has an area of 1.81 km^{2} (0.70 sq mi).

== Population data ==
According to the 2011 Census of Bangladesh, the ward had a population of 50,366. The average household size was 4.6. The literacy rate (age 7 and over) was 70.3%, compared to the national average of 51.8%.

== Councillor list ==
Election	Councillor	Party
2005	Faiz Ahmed	Bangladesh Awami League
2010	Abdus Sabur Liton	Bangladesh Awami League
2015	SM Ershad Ullah	Bangladesh Awami League
2021	Abdus Sabur Liton	Bangladesh Awami League
