= Government Muslim High School =

Government Muslim High School, Chittagong
- গভ. মুসলিম হাই স্কুল, চট্টগ্রাম
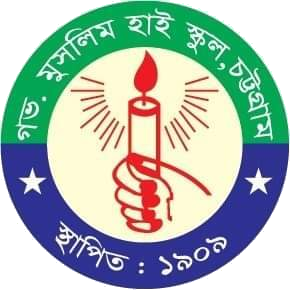
- Logo of Govt. Muslim High School
- Court Road, Chattogram; Chattogram, Kotwali; Bangladesh

Information
- Type: Public Secondary School, Doubleshift
- Motto: জ্ঞানই শক্তি (Knowledge is Power)
- Religious affiliation: Islam (1909-2024; presently not considered)
- Established: 1909; 117 years ago
- Founder: British Government
- School district: Chattogram
- Headmaster: Morsheduz Zaman
- Faculty: 3
- Grades: 5th-10th
- Enrollment: 2500
- Campus size: 20 Acres
- Colours: Blue, Green
- Demonym: Muslimians
- Website: gmhsctg.tsmts.com

Government Muslim High School, Chittagong (Bengali: গভ. মুসলিম হাই স্কুল, চট্টগ্রাম) is a public secondary boys-only school in the court hill area of Kotwali Thana, Chittagong, Bangladesh. It was established in 1874 as the Chittagong Madrasah and was separated in 1909. The school's enrollment is currently 2,501 students.

== History ==
Chittagong Government Madrasah's Anglo-Persian Department was split off to form the school in 1909. Originally it operated out of part of the local Registration Office building. The school opened at first with madrasah and Bengali departments. The first headmaster, from 1910 to 1915, was Khan Shaheb Wahaidun Nabi. It moved to a permanent site in 1916, and was renamed Chittagong Government Muslim High School. In 1953, the Urdu department was also established. In 1970 the school expanded into a new building. There was also a small mosque, which was subsequently enlarged. In 2005 the government established another two buildings, a science lab building and an administration building.

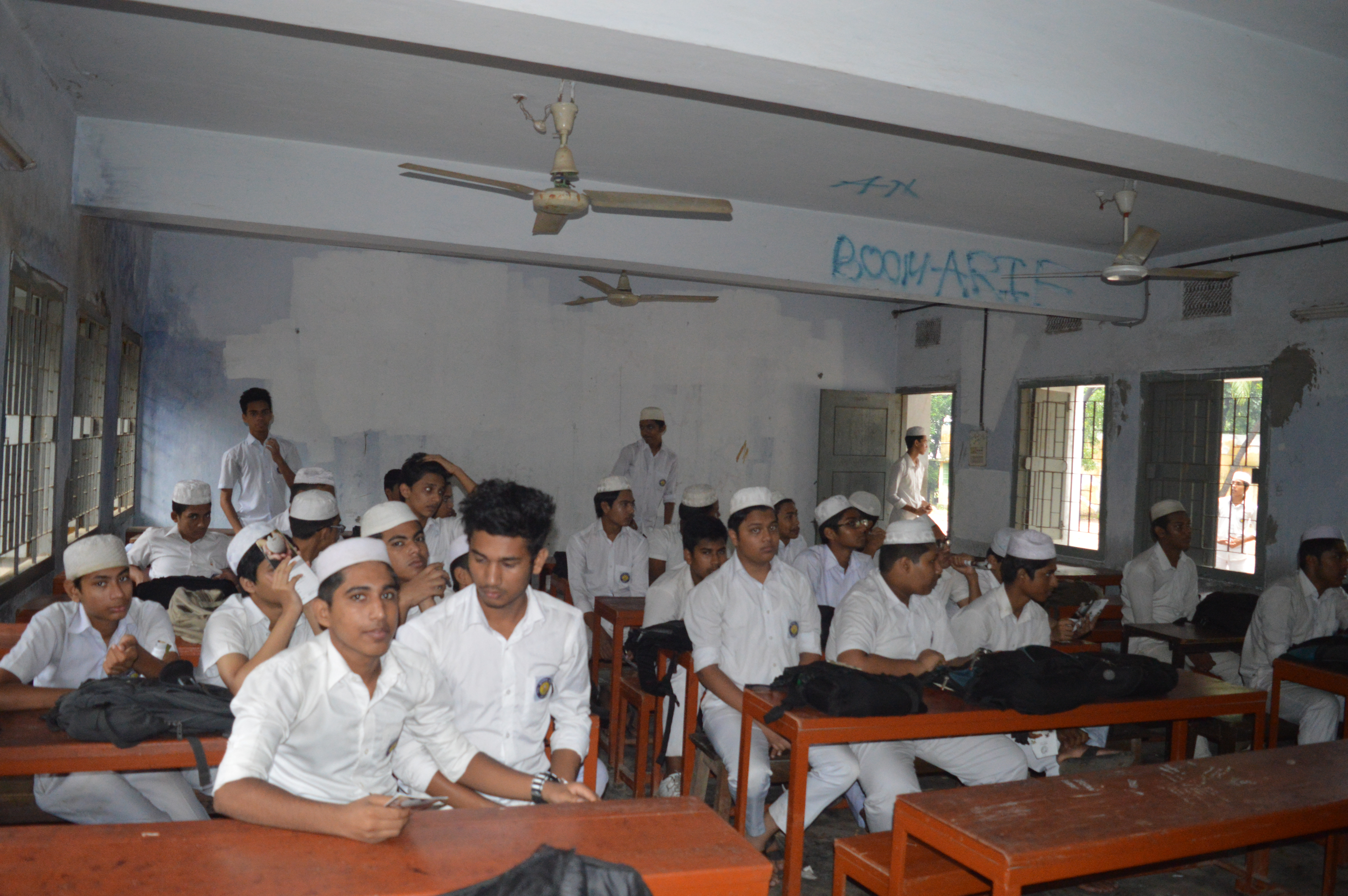
Students participating in a Wikipedia education program organised by Wikimedia Bangladesh in 2015.

The school has a hostel and headmaster's cottage. In front of the school building, there is a large playground. The school has a library which contains more than 2000 books.

== Notable alumni ==
- Ayub Bachchu, Bengali musician
- Mahmudunnabi Chowdhury, former Minister for Relief and Rehabilitation
- Sultan Ahmed, Rohingya longest serving legislator and member of parliament
- Rezaul Karim Chowdhury, Bangladeshi Politician and Mayor of Chittagong
- Sultan Ahmed Chowdhury, 2nd Deputy Speaker of Parliament and former minister
- Piplu Khan, (b. ?) Bangladeshi filmmaker
- Hasan Mahmud, Foreign Minister, Bangladesh. ex-Minister of Information.
- Sarwar Jahan Nizam, former Navy chief Vice Admiral
- A J M Nasir Uddin, former Mayor of Chittagong and Vice President of Bangladesh Cricket Board
- Muhammad Fouzul Kabir Khan, Adviser for Road Transport and Bridges, Adviser for Railways, Adviser for Power, Energy and Mineral Resources
