= 2010 Chattogram City Corporation election =

Mayoral election in Bangladesh

- 10 June 2010
- Registered: 1,688,677 (▲48.35 pp)
- Turnout: 54.51% (▲0.88pp)
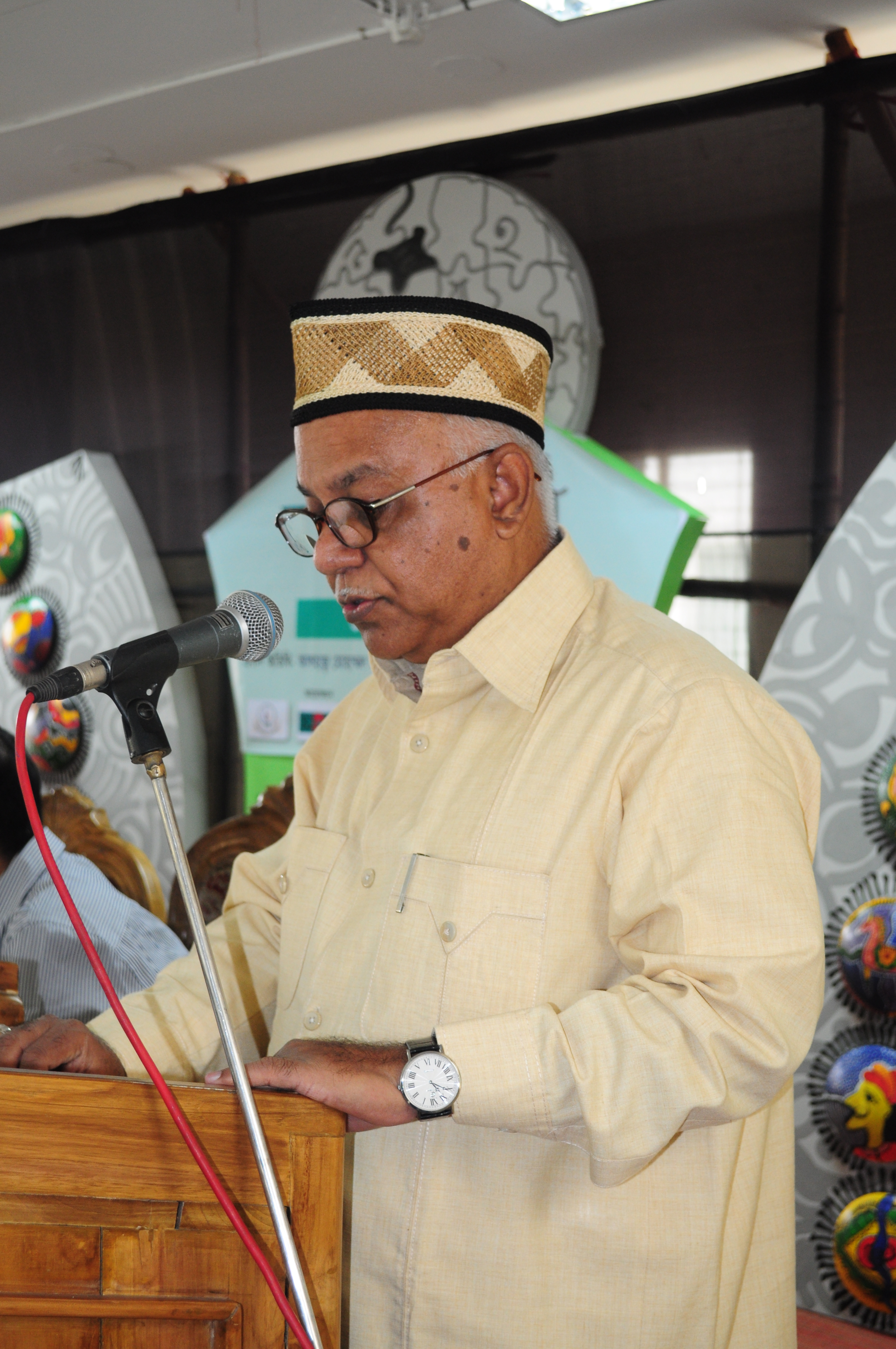

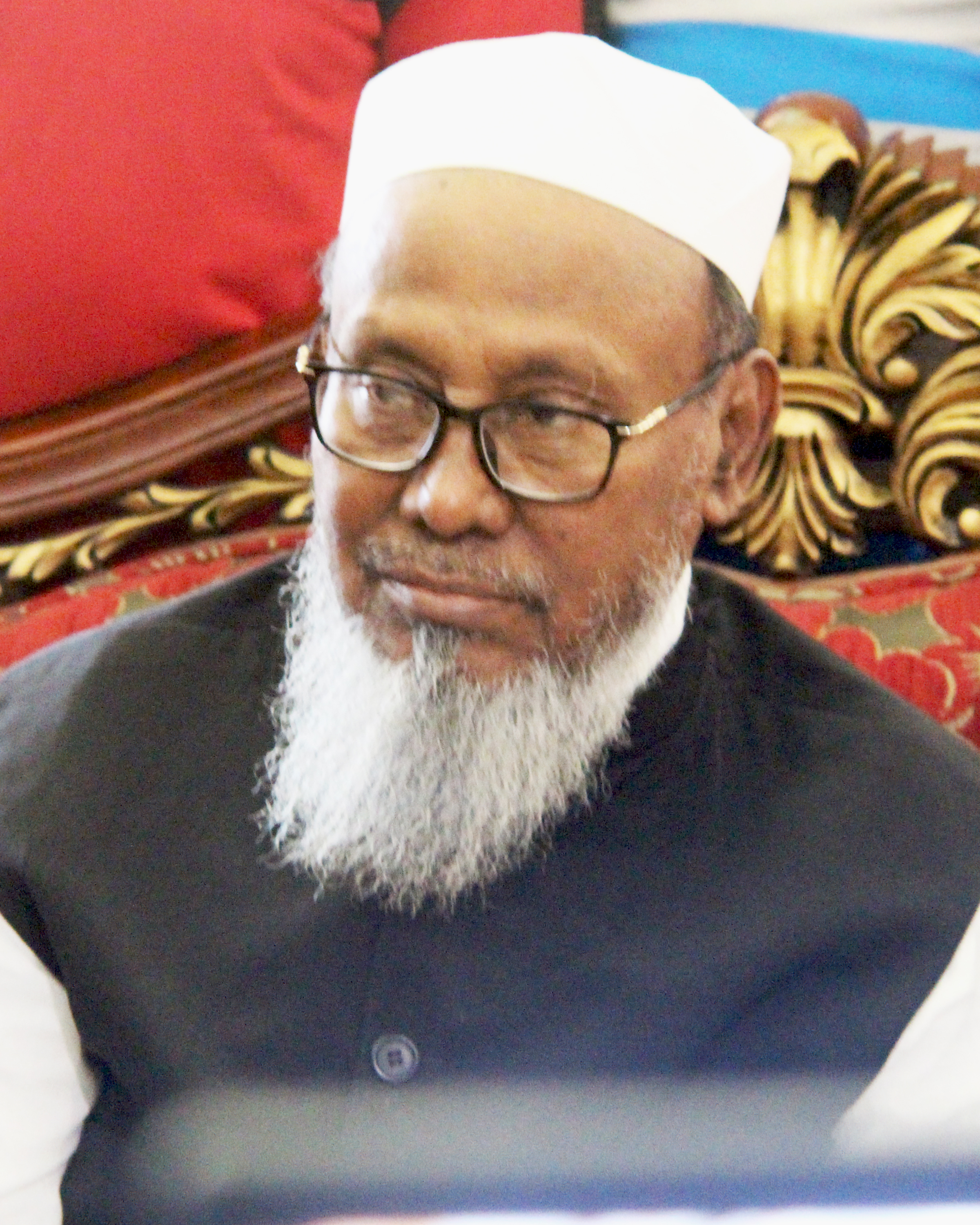
	First party	Second party
Candidate	M. Manjur Alam	A B M Mohiuddin Chowdhury
Party	BNP	AL
popular vote	479,145	383,617
Percentage	54.14%	43.34%
Swing	▲13.35pp	▼11.85pp
Mayor before election
A B M Mohiuddin Chowdhury
AL
Elected Mayor
M. Manjur Alam
BNP
- Council election
- 10 June 2010; 55 seats in the Chattogram City Corporation
Party	Leader	Seats	+/–
AL	A B M Mohiuddin Chowdhury	31	−4
BNP	M. Manjur Alam	20	+4
Jamaat	Didn't participate	2	0
BSD	Didn't participate	1	+1
Independent	—	1	−1
This lists parties that won seats. See the complete results below.

The 2010 Chattogram City Corporation election was a local government election held in Chattogram, Bangladesh, on 10 June 2010 to elect the mayor of Chittagong and the city council. A total of 8 candidates contested the mayoral race. The Bangladesh Nationalist Party (BNP) candidate Mohammad Manjur Alam won the election. In the 55-member City Council, the Awami League won 31 seats, while the BNP and its allies won 22 seats, and the remaining seats were won by others. The candidates received neutral election symbols in this election.

== Mayoral election results ==
Candidate	Party	Votes	%
M. Manjur Alam	Bangladesh Nationalist Party	479,145	54.14
ABM Mohiuddin Chowdhury	Bangladesh Awami League	383,617	43.34
Mofazzal Hossain Bhuiyan	Independent	8,813	1.00
Rafiq Islam	Islami Andolan Bangladesh	6,521	0.74
Mohammad Ibrahim	Independent	2,267	0.26
Solaiman Alam Seth	Jatiya Party (Ershad)	2,083	0.24
Jane Alam	Independent	1,951	0.22
Syed Shamsuzzoha	Independent	667	0.08
Total		885,064	100.00
Valid votes		885,064	96.14
Invalid/blank votes		35,506	3.86
Total votes		920,570	100.00
Registered voters/turnout		1,688,677	54.51
BNP gain from Awami League			

== Council election results ==
=== Party-wise ===
2010 CCC council election results (party-wise)
Party	Leader	Councilor contested seats	Councilor elected in Seats	Ward Councilors	Reserved Women Councilors
Bangladesh Awami League	A. B. M. Mohiuddin Chowdhury	55	31 / 55	20	11
Bangladesh Nationalist Party	M. Manjur Alam	43	20 / 55	18	2
Bangladesh Jamaat-e-Islami	Didn't participate	12	2 / 55	2	0
Socialist Party of Bangladesh	Didn't participate	unknown	1 / 55	0	1
Independent	unknown		1 / 55	1	0
Total			55	41	14
