= Shahadat Hossain (Chittagong politician) =

Bangladeshi politician

- শাহাদাত হোসেন
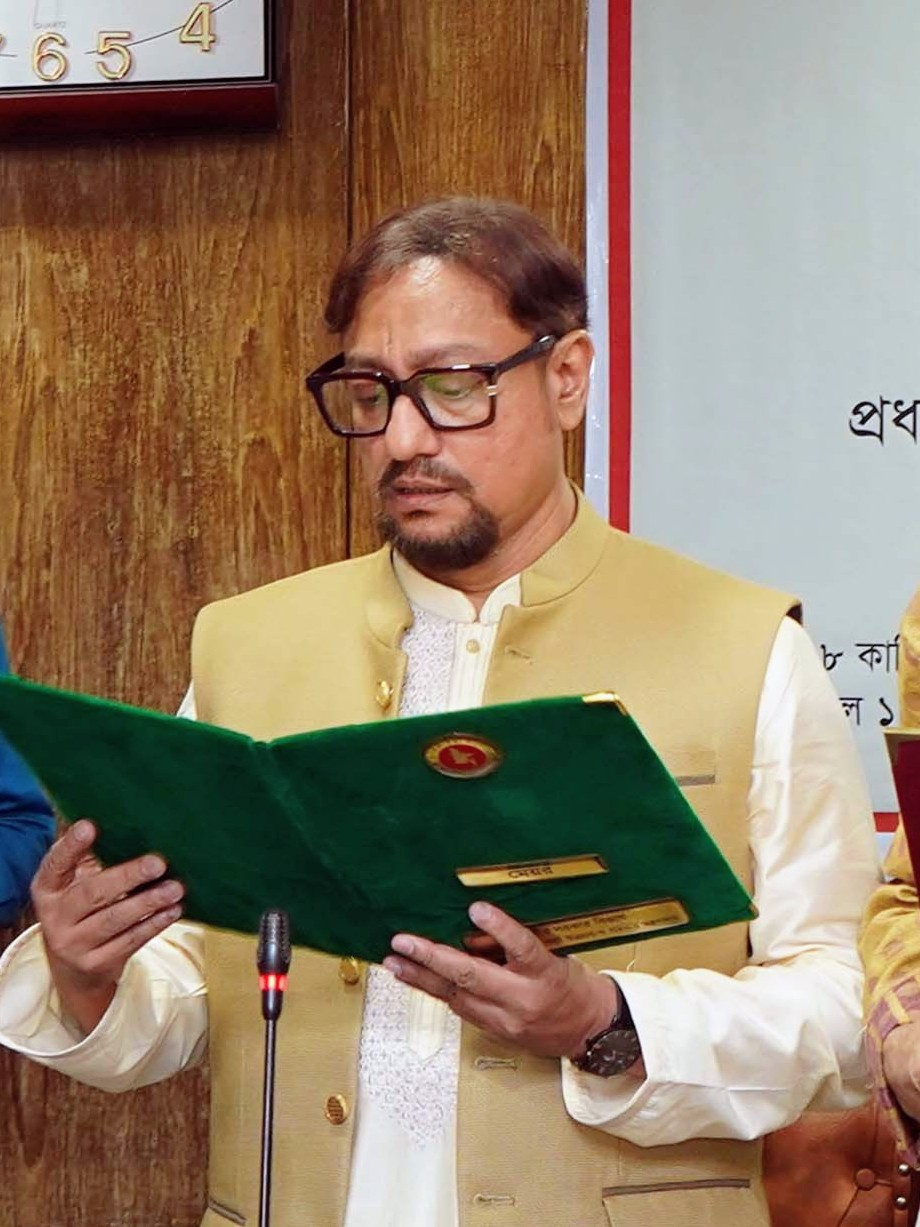
- Hossain taking oath as mayor in 2024

7th Mayor of Chittagong
- Incumbent
- Assumed office 3 November 2024
- Preceded by: Md. Tofayel Islam; (as Administrator)

Personal details
- Born: 2 June 1966 (age 60) Chittagong, East Pakistan
- Party: Bangladesh Nationalist Party
- Education: Chittagong Medical College
- Profession: Doctor, politician

Shahadat Hossain (Bengali: শাহাদাত হোসেন), also known as Dr. Shahadat, is a doctor and Bangladeshi politician affiliated with Bangladesh Nationalist Party. He is serving as the mayor of Chittagong since November 2024. He was the former organizing secretary of the Bangladesh Nationalist Party's central executive committee and president of its Chittagong Metropolitan unit.

== Early life and education ==
Hossain was born on 2 June 1966 in Chittagong to Mr. Ahmadur Rahman, a businessman, and Mrs. Shayesta Khanam. He persuaded his MBBS degree from Chittagong Medical College. Then he completed his residency in Physical Medicine and Rehabilitation at Chittagong Medical College and Hospital.

== Career ==
Hossain is the managing director of Treatment Hospital near Prabartak Circle. All throughout the COVID-19 pandemic, he had been providing free telemedicine services to patients through a Facebook page.

Hossain began his political journey through student politics and served as the founding president of the Bangladesh Jatiotabadi Chatra Dal, Chittagong Medical College unit. Apart from this, he also served as the general secretary and later as the president of the Chittagong Metropolitan unit, and as the organizing secretary of the Bangladesh Nationalist Party's central committee. Besides, he has been playing an important role in the ongoing movement led by BNP in the fight to bring back democracy in Bangladesh.

=== Mayor of Chittagong (2024-present) ===
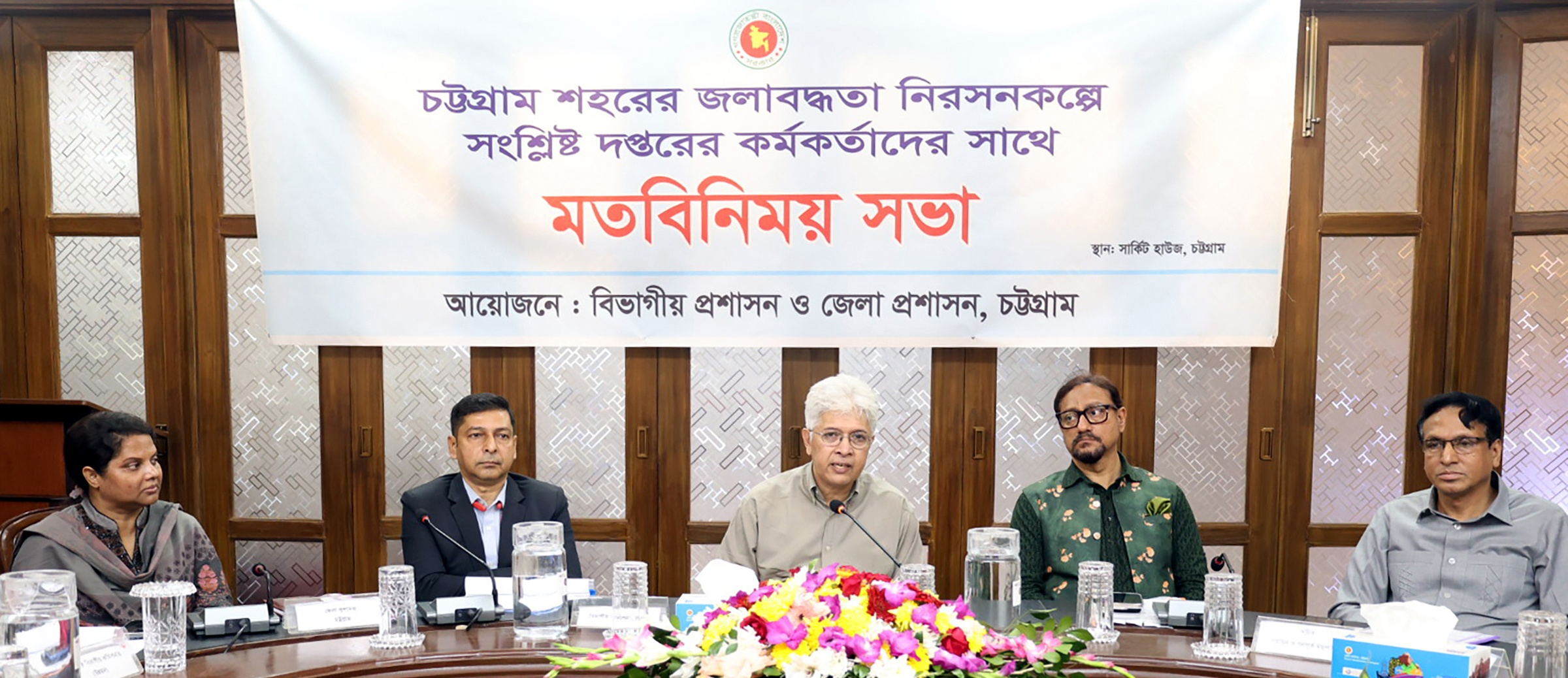
Hossain at a seminar with Adviser for the Ministry of Public Works Adilur Rahman Khan, Deputy Commissioner and Divisional Commissioner of Chittagong.

The Chittagong City Corporation mayoral election was held on 17 January 2021, in which Rezaul Karim Chowdhury of the Bangladesh Awami League was declared elected mayor by the Election Commission of Bangladesh. On 24 February 2021, Shahadat, the Bangladesh Nationalist Party (BNP) candidate, filed a lawsuit against the Election Commission and nine others alleging electoral fraud and seeking annulment of the results. Rezaul Karim Chowdhury left the country upon the fall of Sheikh Hasina on 5 August 2024. On 1 October 2024, the Electoral Tribunal declared Shahadat Hossain the mayor-elect of the Chattogram City Corporation. Hossain was sworn in as the mayor on 3 November 2024. AF Hassan Ariff administered the oath at the Bangladesh Secretariat in Dhaka.

== Controversies ==
Shahadat came into discussion after the tenure of the Chattogram City Corporation council ended in February 2026, yet he continued in office, refusing to step down despite the expiry of the constitutional term. He had assumed office in November 2024 following a court verdict issued after the 2024 regime change.

In response to the criticism, Shahadat argued that, since he took office in 2024, he could continue in the position until 2029. However, according to the Local Government Division, his tenure as mayor is tied to the council elected in 2021 and therefore ended in February 2026, with no legal provision allowing an extension despite his later assumption of office.
