= 2005 Chattogram City Corporation election =

Mayoral election in Bangladesh

- 12 May 2005
- Registered: 1,138,318
- Turnout: 53.61%
- Mayoral election
- 12 May 2005
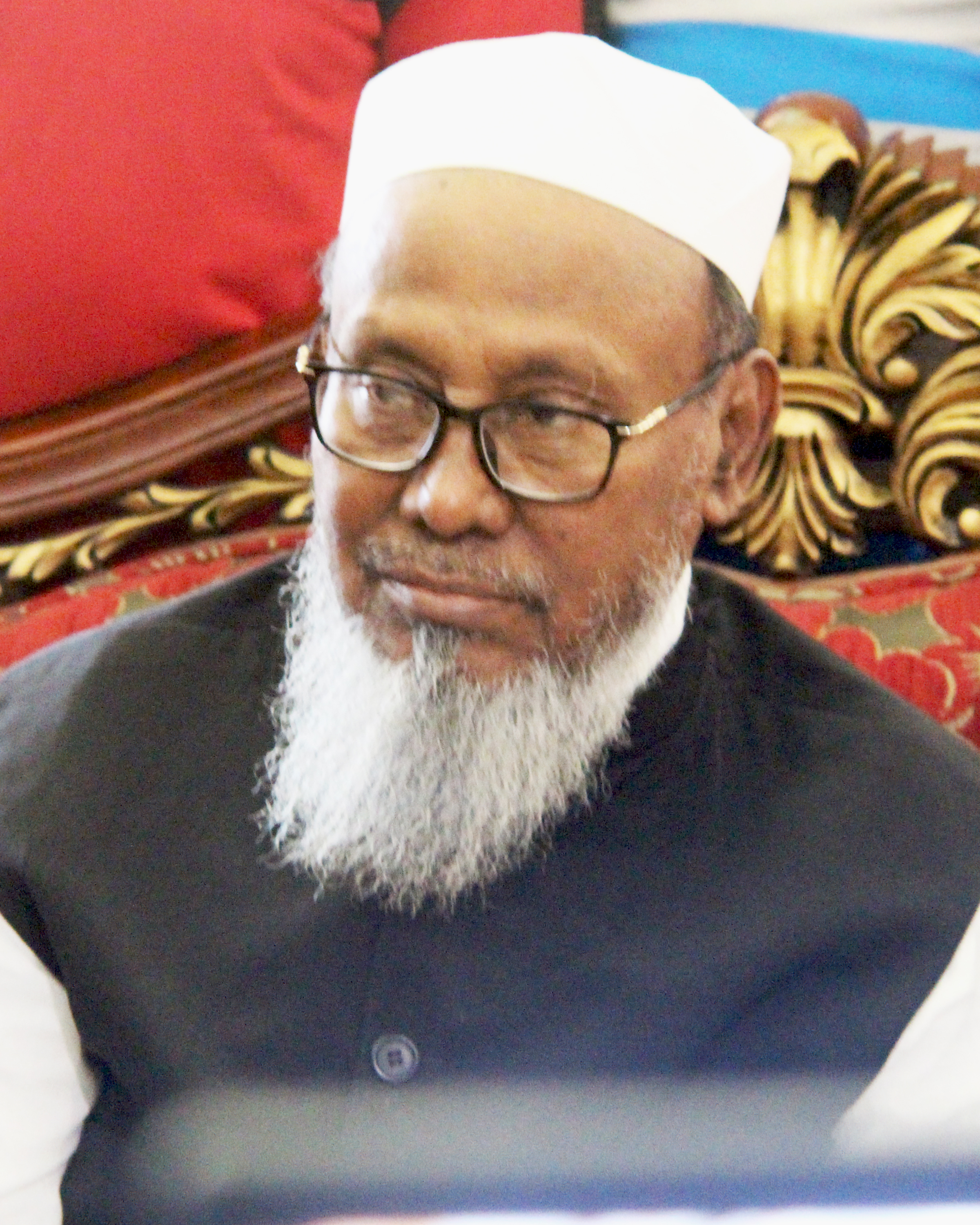

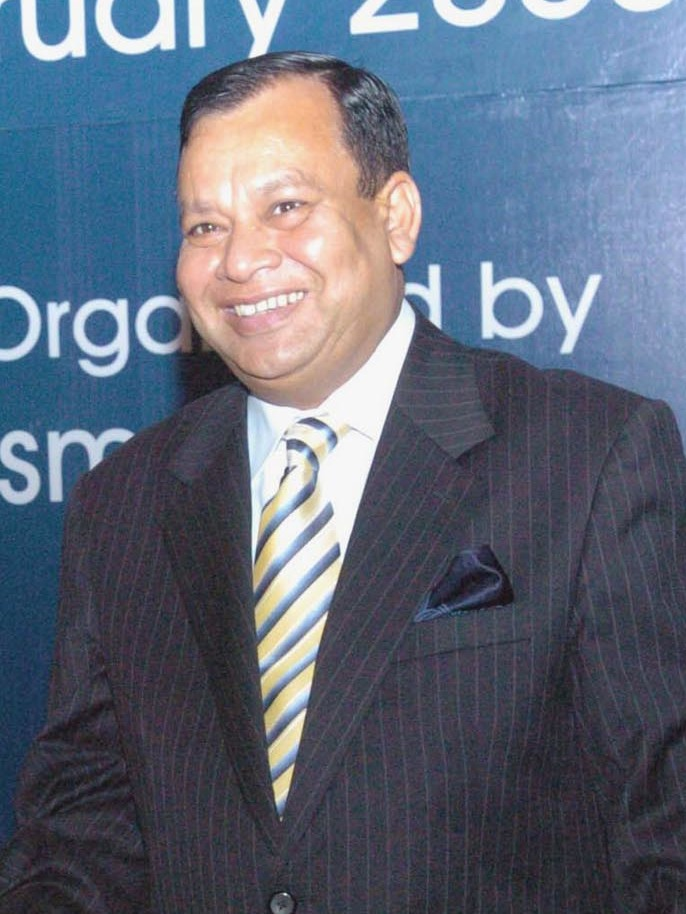
| Nominee | A B M Mohiuddin Chowdhury | Mir Mohammad Nasiruddin |
| Party | AL | BNP |
| Popular vote | 350,891 | 259,410 |
| Percentage | 57.49% | 42.51% |
Mayor before election
A B M Mohiuddin Chowdhury
AL
Elected Mayor
A B M Mohiuddin Chowdhury
AL
- Council election
- 12 May 2005; 55 seats in the Chattogram City Corporation
| Party | Leader | Seats | +/– |
|---|---|---|---|
| AL | A B M Mohiuddin Chowdhury | 35 | +4 |
| BNP | Mir Mohammad Nasiruddin | 16 | +16 |
| Jamaat | Didn’t Participate | 2 | +2 |
| Independent | — | 2 | +2 |
This lists parties that won seats. See the complete results below.

The 2005 election for mayor of Chattogram City Corporation was held on 12 May 2005.The result was a victory again for the Bangladesh Awami League candidate A B M Mohiuddin Chowdhury. He beat Mir Mohammed Nasiruddin, the Bangladesh Nationalist Party's candidate and previous mayor who was appointed to his post.

== Mayoral election results ==
| Candidate | Party | Votes | % |
|---|---|---|---|
| ABM Mohiuddin Chowdhury | Bangladesh Awami League | 350,891 | 57.49 |
| Mir Mohammad Nasiruddin | Bangladesh Nationalist Party | 259,410 | 42.51 |
| Total | | 610,301 | 100.00 |
| Valid votes | | 610,301 | 100.00 |
| Invalid/blank votes | | 0 | 0.00 |
| Total votes | | 610,301 | 100.00 |
| Registered voters/turnout | | 1,138,318 | 53.61 |
| Bangladesh Awami League hold | | | |
