= Panchlaish Ward =

Panchlaish পাঁচলাইশ
- Ward
- Coordinates: 22°24′N 91°50.2′E
- Country: Bangladesh
- Division: Chittagong Division
- District: Chittagong District
- Metropolis: Chittagong
- Thana: Bayazid
- Jatiya Sangsad constituency: Chittagong-8
- Formed: 1989; 37 years ago

Government
  - Type: Mayor–Council
  - Body: Chattogram City Corporation
  - Councillor: Vacant

Area
  - Total: 6.43 km^{2} (2.48 sq mi)

Population (2022)
  - Total: 85,718
  - Density: 13,300/km^{2} (34,500/sq mi)
- Time zone: UTC+6 (BST)
- Postal code: 4211
- Website: ccc.gov.bd

Panchlaish (Bengali: পাঁচলাইশ) is the No. 03 Ward of Chattogram City Corporation and a part of Bayazid Thana, Bangladesh.

== Population data ==
According to the 2011 Census of Bangladesh, the ward had a population of 68,794. The average household size was 4.8. The literacy rate (age 7 and over) was 64.3%, compared to the national average of 51.8%.
