= Jamal Khan Ward =

Jamal Khan জামালখান
- Ward
- No. 21 Jamal Khan Ward
- Coordinates: 22°20.7′N 91°50.1′E
- Country: Bangladesh
- Division: Chittagong Division
- District: Chittagong District
- Metropolis: Chittagong
- Thana: Kotwali
- Jatiya Sangsad constituency: Chittagong-9
- Formed: 1989; 37 years ago

Government
  - Type: Mayor–Council
  - Body: Chattogram City Corporation
  - Councillor: Vacant

Area
  - Total: 0.78 km^{2} (0.30 sq mi)

Population (2022)
  - Total: 49,857
  - Density: 64,000/km^{2} (170,000/sq mi)
- Time zone: UTC+6 (BST)
- Postal code: 4000
- Website: ccc.gov.bd

Jamal Khan (Bengali: জামালখান) is the No. 21 Ward of Chattogram City Corporation and a part of Kotwali Thana, Bangladesh.

== Size ==
Jamal Khan Ward has an area of 0.78 km^{2} (0.30 sq mi).

== Population data ==
According to the 2011 Census of Bangladesh, the ward had a population of 40,014. The average household size was 5.0. The literacy rate (age 7 and over) was 78.9%, compared to the national average of 51.8%.
