= M. Manjur Alam =

Bangladeshi politician and businessman

- এম. মনজুর আলম
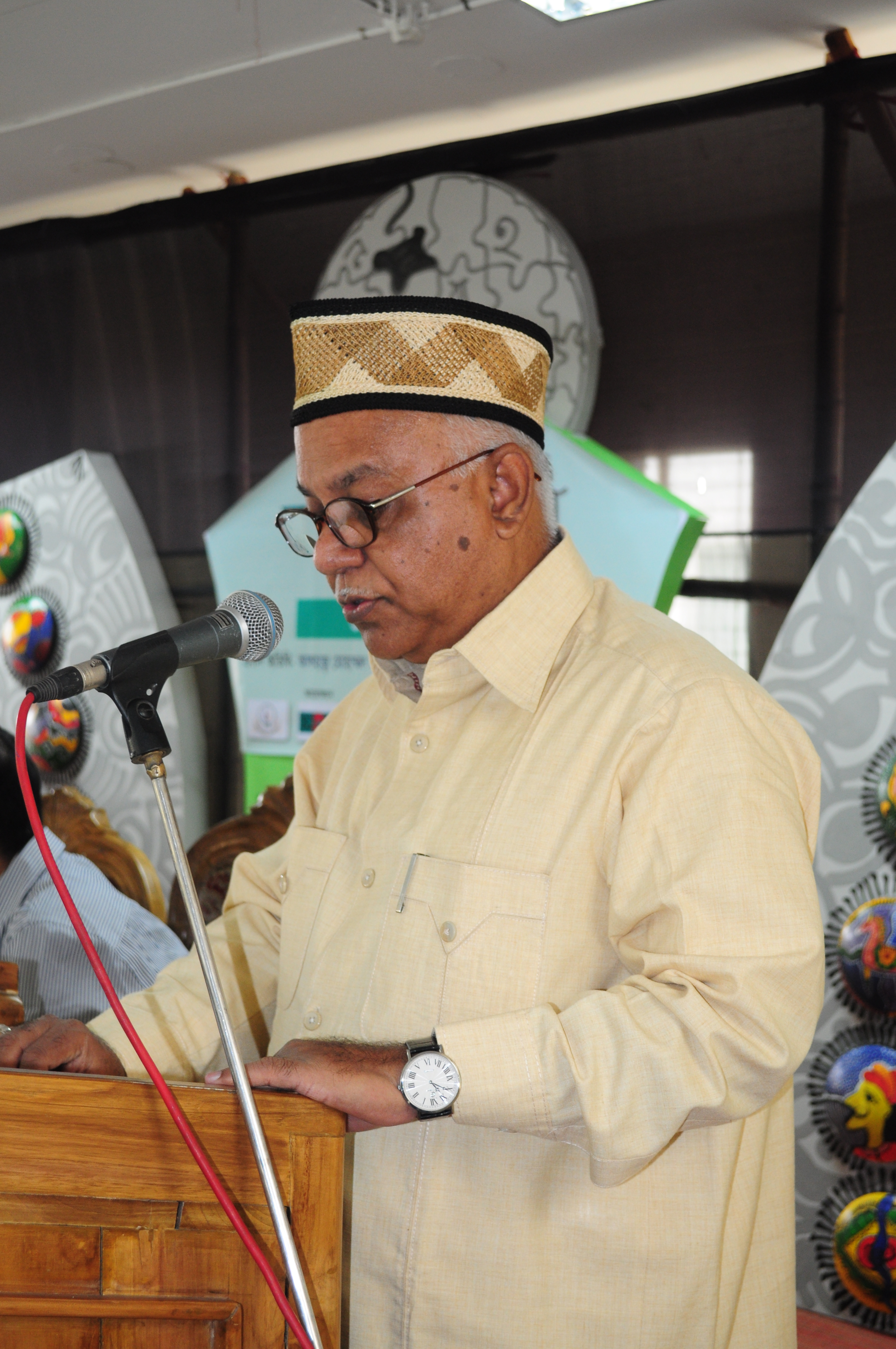
- Alam in 2012

4th Mayor of Chittagong
- In office 10 June 2010 – 6 May 2015
- Preceded by: A. B. M. Mohiuddin Chowdhury
- Succeeded by: A. J. M. Nasir Uddin
- In office 29 March 2007 – 4 September 2008 as Acting Mayor
- Preceded by: A. B. M. Mohiuddin Chowdhury
- Succeeded by: A. B. M. Mohiuddin Chowdhury

Personal details
- Born: North Kattali, Chittagong, East Pakistan
- Party: Bangladesh Awami League
- Other political affiliations: Bangladesh Nationalist Party
- Relations: Didarul Alam (nephew)
- Profession: Businessman

M. Manjur Alam aka Mohammad Manjur Alam (Bengali: এম. মনজুর আলম) is a Bangladeshi politician and businessman. He is the former mayor of Chittagong and managing director of Mostafa-Hakim Group.

== Political career ==
Alam was elected councillor of North Kattali Ward on 30 January 1994 with the support of Bangladesh Awami League. He was re-elected twice with the support of Awami League. After ABM Mohiuddin Chowdhury was imprisoned by the caretaker government during the 2007-2008 Bangladeshi political crises, Alam became the acting mayor. During that time Alam's relationship with Mohiuddin deteriorated. Alam sought the nomination of Bangladesh Nationalist Party to contest the 9th parliamentary election from Chittagong-8. He did not get the nomination.

Alam was elected mayor of Chittagong in 2010 as a candidate of Chattagram Unnayan Andolon and backed by Bangladesh Nationalist Party. He won after defeating ABM Mohiuddin Chowdhury, backed by Awami League.

In 2015, Alam lost the re-election to Awami League backed candidate AJM Nasir Uddin. Alam boycotted voting alleging irregularities. According to Bdnews24.com, there was alleged vote rigging in some polling stations by Awami League, which was in power at national government level.

Alam runs the Bangamata Sheikh Fazilatunnesa Memorial Foundation. He has announced that he has retired from politics and will engage in social work. But he participated in the 2024 Bangladeshi general election as an independent candidate from the Chittagong-10 constituency.
