= EPZ Thana =

Thana in Chattogram Division, Bangladesh

EPZ ইপিজেড
- Thana
- Location in Bangladesh
- Coordinates: 22°23′N 91°52′E
- Country: Bangladesh
- Division: Chittagong Division
- District: Chittagong District
- Elevation: 15 m (49 ft)

Population (2022)
  - Total: 256,208
- Time zone: UTC+6 (BST)
- Postal code: 4223
- Area code: 031

EPZ (Bengali: ইপিজেড) is a thana under the Chattogram District in Chattogram Division, Bangladesh.

== Demographics ==
Religions in EPZ Thana (2022)
| Religion | Percent |
| Islam | 90.46% |
| Buddhism | 4.71% |
| Hinduism | 4.66% |
| Other or not stated | 0.17% |

According to the 2022 Bangladeshi census, EPZ Thana had 83,226 households and a population of 256,208. 6.91% of the population were under 5 years of age. EPZ had a literacy rate (age 7 and over) of 88.97%: 90.27% for males and 87.54% for females, and a sex ratio of 110.27 males for every 100 females.
