= A. J. M. Nasir Uddin =

Bangladeshi politician

- আ জ ম নাছির উদ্দীন
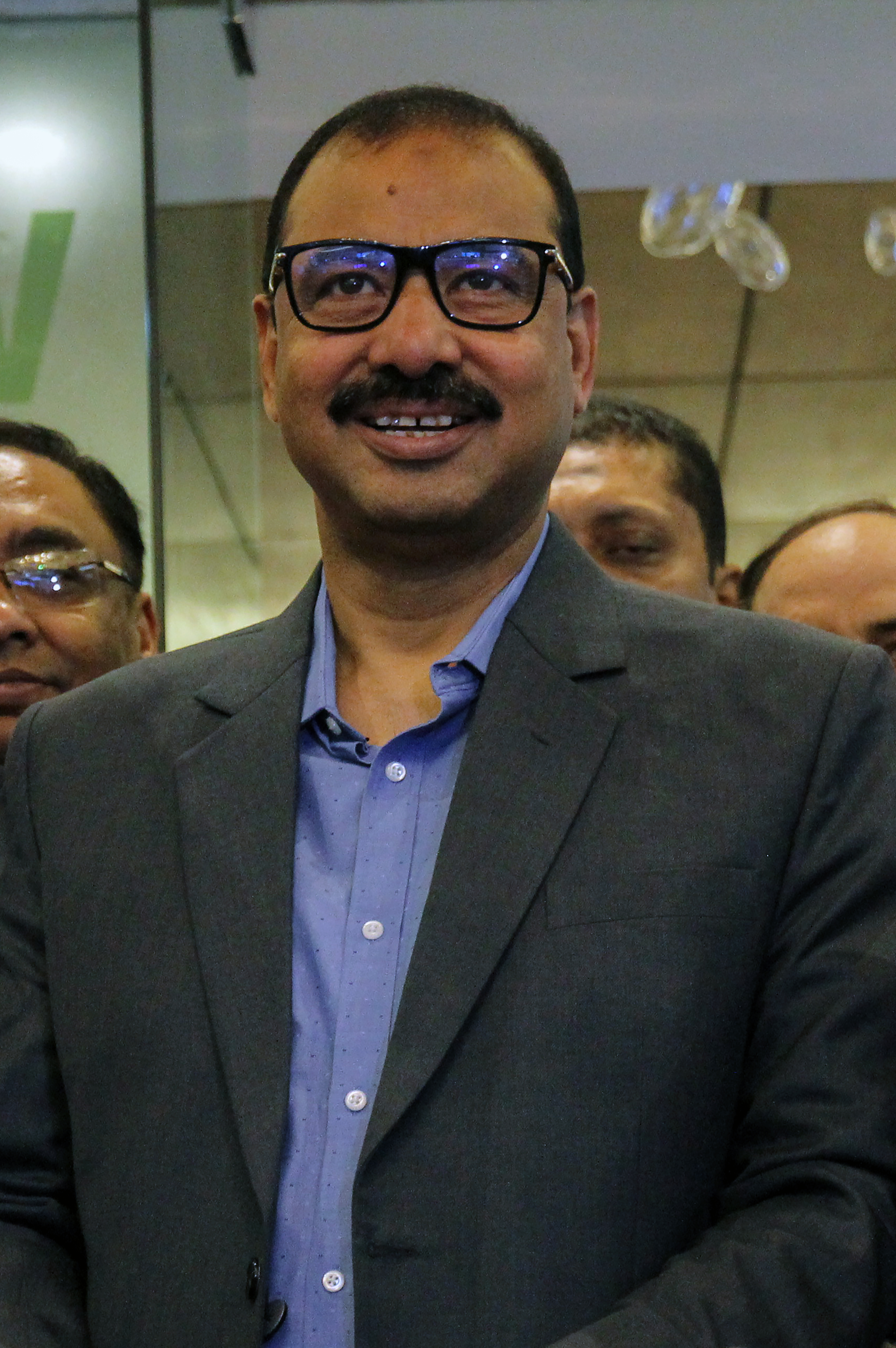

Vice President of Bangladesh Cricket Board
- In office 16 September 2014 – 21 August 2024
- President: Nazmul Hassan
- Preceded by: Mahbub Anam

5th Mayor of Chittagong
- In office 7 May 2015 – 4 August 2020
- Preceded by: M. Manjur Alam
- Succeeded by: Khorshed Alam Sujon; as Administrator

Personal details
- Born: 1 January 1957 (age 69) Chittagong, East Pakistan
- Party: Bangladesh Awami League
- Spouse: Shirin Akter
- Children: 2
- Education: Chittagong College; Government Muslim High School
- Profession: Businessman, politician

Abu Jahed Mohammad Nasir Uddin (born 1 January 1957) is a Bangladeshi politician who is a former mayor of Chittagong. He is a member of the Awami League. He has been accused of playing a key role in the July massacre in Chittagong, carried out under Sheikh Hasina's administration.

== Personal life ==
Nasir was born on 1 January 1957, in Andarkilla, Chittagong. He was a pupil at Kadam Mubarak Primary. He completed his Secondary School Certificate (SSC) in 1973 from Government Muslim High School and his Higher Secondary Certificate (HSC) at Chittagong College.

== Career ==
Nasir became active in politics in the early 1980s, serving as the president of the Chittagong College Chhatra League in 1977. During this time, he also held the position of cultural secretary for the city Chhatra League. He went on to become the general secretary of the city Chhatra League in 1980 and 1982, and was appointed as the vice-president of the central committee of the Bangladesh Chhatra League in 1983 and 1985.

On 24 January 1993, an Awami League rally led by Sheikh Hasina at Laldighi Maidan, Chittagong, took place. A case was filed by Sufian Siddique, Bangladesh Chattra League leader, against 28, including Uddin, alleging they had attacked him there. Bangladesh Police submitted the charge sheet in the case on 7 March 1993. Uddin was acquitted in the case on 23 July 2015.

Uddin submitted his nomination form to contest the mayoral election in Chittagong on 31 March 2015. He won election on 30 April 2015, defeating the Bangladesh Nationalist Party (BNP) candidate, Mohammad Manjur Alam. The BNP called the vote rigged and boycotted it. A voter was threatened with three years imprisonment by a polling agent of Uddin saying that his vote had already been cast. In 2017, Uddin traded barbs with former mayor ABM Mohiuddin Chowdhury.

After Nasir's term as mayor of Chittagong ended in 2020 he did not receive a nomination from Awami League for the future election. He blamed it on a "conspiracy". The Awami League nominated Rezaul Karim Chowdhury for mayor.

== Controversies ==
Nasir has been accused of being a patron of criminals in Chittagong. His influence extended beyond Chittagong to adjoining districts, and no committee of Awami League, Jubo League, Chhatra League, or other associate organizations could be formed without his consent.

Nasir's men were allegedly involved in various crimes, including violence, killings, extortion, and sexual harassment, particularly in educational institutions. In Chittagong University, his followers controlled nine out of 11 sub-groups of the Chhatra League, which were responsible for numerous clashes, vandalism, and other criminal activities.

Some of the notable incidents include:

- Double murder in CRB
- Killing of central Chhatra League leader Diaz Irfan Chowdhury
- Vandalism of the vice chancellor's office
- Abduction of drivers of shuttle trains
- Extortion and clashes in Chittagong Medical College Hospital (CMCH) and Chittagong Law College

Nasir's armed cadres, including Saiful Alam alias Milon, Alamgir Tipu, Iqbal Tipu, Md Firoz, and Esrarul Haeu, were involved in various crimes, including shooting at student protesters and vandalizing properties.

Nasir was also accused of irregularities during his tenure as mayor, including slapping an engineer, seeking bribes, and facilitating contractors who left with millions of taka without completing projects.

His followers, including Raju Munshi, Iqbal Hossain, Sayedul Islam, and others, controlled residential halls and were involved in extortion, clashes, and other criminal activities.

Nasir's rise to power and his control over student politics and crime have been criticized by many, including Akhtar Kabir Chowdhury, Chattogram chapter secretary of Shushashoner Jonno Nagorik (SHUJAN), who stated that Nasir's activities have disrupted the academic environment in various institutions.

=== Campus violence at University of Chittagong ===
Under the leadership of Uddin, it is alleged that nine out of eleven factions of the Bangladesh Chhatra League (BCL) at the University of Chittagong operated under his influence. His followers were reportedly involved in incidents of campus violence, extortion, dormitory takeovers, physical harassment of university staff, vandalism, and even threats against faculty and contractors. From 2019 to 2024, there were at least 168 reported altercations and conflicts within the university, with accusations linking his followers to incidents such as the double murder at CRB area and the death of Diaz Irfan Chowdhury, a central BCL leader.

For more than a decade, these BCL factions controlled various aspects of student life on campus, with two factions tied to former Education Minister Mohibul Hasan Chowdhury, while the remaining groups reportedly aligned with Nasir. After the Student–People's uprising on 5 August, many faction leaders were said to have left the campus, which had long been marred by incidents including the intimidation of students who voiced dissent, influencing hiring decisions, vandalizing the vice chancellor's office, and instances of student-led kidnappings of shuttle train drivers, reportedly at least 40 times. Besides, it is alleged that Nasir Uddin's endorsements enabled some of his followers, even those without student status, to secure BCL committee positions.

=== Gang activity ===
Uddin's associates have faced numerous allegations of violence and criminal activities. Among his followers, individuals like Saiful Alam (alias Limon), Alamgir Tipu, Iqbal Tipu, Mohammad Firoz, and Ward Councillor Esrarul Haque are notable figures often associated with alleged violence and intimidation tactics. Another councillor, Jahurul Haque Jashim of North Pahartali Ward, has been implicated in illegal hill-cutting and has faced at least five legal cases. He reportedly enjoyed impunity under Nasir's protection, which allegedly emboldened him. In one case, Jashim was charged with throwing rocks at the car of Syeda Rizwana Hasan, an environmental adviser, during her environmental advocacy work.

=== Vote rigging ===
In 2015, Uddin was elected mayor of Chittagong, defeating then-incumbent Mayor Manjur Alam in a controversial election. It is alleged that Nasir's associate, former MP Nizam Uddin Hazari from Feni, deployed groups of armed enforcers to influence the election and engage in vote rigging. By noon on election day, Manjur Alam had publicly announced his decision to boycott the election due to these irregularities.

=== Assault ===
During his tenure as mayor, Uddin slapped an engineer from the National Housing Authority at the city corporation office over land disputes regarding construction of sewage line between National Housing Authority and Chittagong City Corporation.

=== Arbitrary authority ===
Following A.B.M. Mohiuddin Chowdhury's death in 2017, A.J.M. Nasir Uddin reportedly gained sole control of the Chittagong Awami League, establishing his own faction and intensifying internal conflicts within the organization. On 28 October 2019, he forced Hasina Mohiuddin, the wife of the former mayor of Chittagong, ABM Mohiuddin Chowdhury, off the stage at a program of the Awami League. On 20 June 2024, Nasir engaged in a heated confrontation with Rezaul Karim, the immediate past mayor and joint secretary of the Awami League, during the party council. Rezaul Karim accused Nasir of unilaterally forming ward, thana, and unit committees, claiming that he did not select leaders based on their dedication to the party.

Nasir has also served as general secretary of the Chattogram District Sports Association (CDSA) for over a decade, first winning the role in 2011 by defeating then-general secretary Hafizur Rahman and later being re-elected uncontested for three additional terms, as no one challenged him to avoid conflict. Furthermore, he faces allegations of forgery in his pursuit of a position within the Chattogram Cooperative Housing Society, where he held the presidency for three consecutive terms before his elder brother, Saifuddin, succeeded him. During his tenure at this association, which comprises approximately 4,500 members, he has been accused of facilitating various advantages, including land transactions and admission trade at the Ankur Society School.

=== Involvement in the Student–People's uprising ===
During the Student–People's uprising, Uddin's armed associates allegedly played a prominent role. On 16 July in Muradpur and on 4 August in the Chandgaon area, associates Mohammad Firoz and Esrarul Haque were reported to have fired on protesters, and images of Firoz with a firearm were circulated in the media. These incidents led to both being named in at least five related cases. Firoz, previously identified as a Chhatra Shibir operative and arrested twice with firearms, began aligning himself with the Jubo League by 2014–15, displaying billboards with Uddin and former Chhatra League leader Didarul Alam. His ties to Uddin's faction remain strong. Councillor Esrarul Haque, similarly close to Uddin, is also alleged to have led a youth gang in the Chandgaon area and remains listed by police as a suspected gang leader.
