= Rezaul Karim Chowdhury =

Bangladeshi politician

Rezaul Karim Choudhury
- রেজাউল করিম চৌধুরী
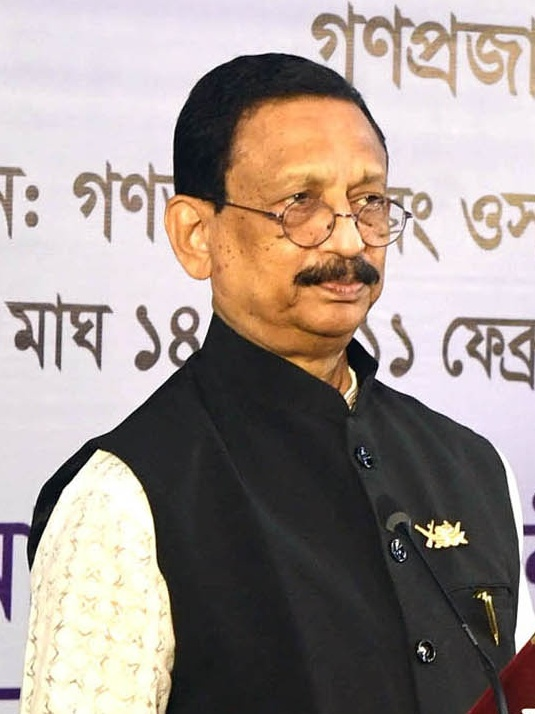
- Chowdhury in 2021.

6th Mayor of Chittagong
- In office 15 February 2021 – 19 August 2024
- Preceded by: Khorshed Alam Sujon; as Administrator
- Succeeded by: Md. Tofayel Islam; as Administrator

Personal details
- Born: 31 May 1953 (age 73) Chittagong, East Bengal, Pakistan
- Party: Bangladesh Awami League
- Spouse: Selina Akter
- Children: 3
- Education: University of Chittagong
- Profession: Businessman, politician

Military service
- Branch/service: Mukti Bahini
- Years of service: 1971
- Battles/wars: Bangladesh Liberation War

Rezaul Karim Chowdhury (Bengali: রেজাউল করিম চৌধুরী; born 31 May 1953) is a Bangladeshi politician who served as the 6th mayor of Chittagong. He was elected mayor in 2021, but was removed in 2024 after a district court found evidence of election rigging, following the fall of the Awami League regime.

== Early life and education ==
Chowdhury was born on 31 May 1953 in East Sholashahar ward 7 in Chittagong. He studied at East Sholashahar Primary School. He completed his S. S. C. from Government Muslim High School and H. S. C. from Chittagong College. He has a B.A. from the University of Chittagong.

== Career ==
Chowdhury was the president of Bangladesh Chhatra League unit from 1972 to 1976. From 1976 to 1978, he was the general secretary of the North Chittagong District unit of the Bangladesh Chhatra League.

Chowdhury worked in the Chittagong City unit of the Awami League from 1997 to 2006 as the information and research secretary. He then became the organising secretary of the city unit; a position he held till 2014 when he became the joint general secretary.

Chowdhury was nominated by Awami League to contest the Chittagong City elections in 2020. The party did not nominate the incumbent and Awami League politician AJM Nasir Uddin on instructions from Prime Minister Sheikh Hasina. Chittagong city Awami League was divided into two fractions; led by A J M Nasir Uddin and the family of ABM Mohiuddin Chowdhury. Chowdhury got the nomination by not being involved in either fraction. He went on to win the election receiving 369,000 votes while his nearest rival from the Bangladesh Nationalist Party received 52,000 votes in a rigged election. He received the status of state minister on 7 August 2022. Later in 2024, the court found evidence of election rigging for the election.

He abandoned his position and did not appear at his office after the fall of the Awami League government amid the 2024 student-people's uprising. The interim government removed the mayor on 19 August and appointed Chittagong divisional commissioner Md Tofael Hossain as administrator.

== Personal life ==
Chowdhury is married to Selina Akter and has a son and two daughters.
