= Halishahar Thana =

Thana in Chittagong Division, Bangladesh

Halishahar হালিশহর
- Thana
- Location in Bangladesh
- Coordinates: 22°20′12.12″N 91°46′29.64″E
- Thana: Bangladesh
- Division: Chittagong Division
- District: Chittagong District
- Metropolis: Chittagong
- Jatiya Sangsad constituency: Chittagong-10
- Formed: 1978; 48 years ago

Government
  - Type: Metropolitan Police
  - Body: Chattogram Metropolitan Police
  - Officer in Charge: Mohammad Moniruzzaman

Area
  - Total: 9.64 km^{2} (3.72 sq mi)
- Elevation: 15 m (49 ft)

Population (2022)
  - Total: 234,450
  - Density: 15,717.3/km^{2} (40,708/sq mi)
- Time zone: UTC+6 (BST)
- Postal code: 4216
- Area code: 031

Halishahar (Bengali: হালিশহর) is a thana of Chittagong District in Chittagong Division, Bangladesh. Halishahar Housing Estate is a large residential area in Chittagong.

== Geography ==
Total area of this thana is 9.64 km^{2} (3.72 sq mi)

== Demographics ==
Religions in Halishahar Thana (2022)
Religion	Percent
Islam	95.81%
Hinduism	3.59%
Buddhism	0.52%
Other or not stated	0.07%

According to the 2022 Bangladeshi census, Halishahar Thana had 55,959 households and a population of 234,450. 8.58% of the population were under 5 years of age. Halishahar had a literacy rate (age 7 and over) of 85.44%: 87.20% for males and 83.59% for females, and a sex ratio of 105.75 males for every 100 females.

== Places ==
=== Areas ===
Block A	Block B	Block I	Block J	Block K	Block L	Block G	Block H	Block Z

=== Anandabazar ===
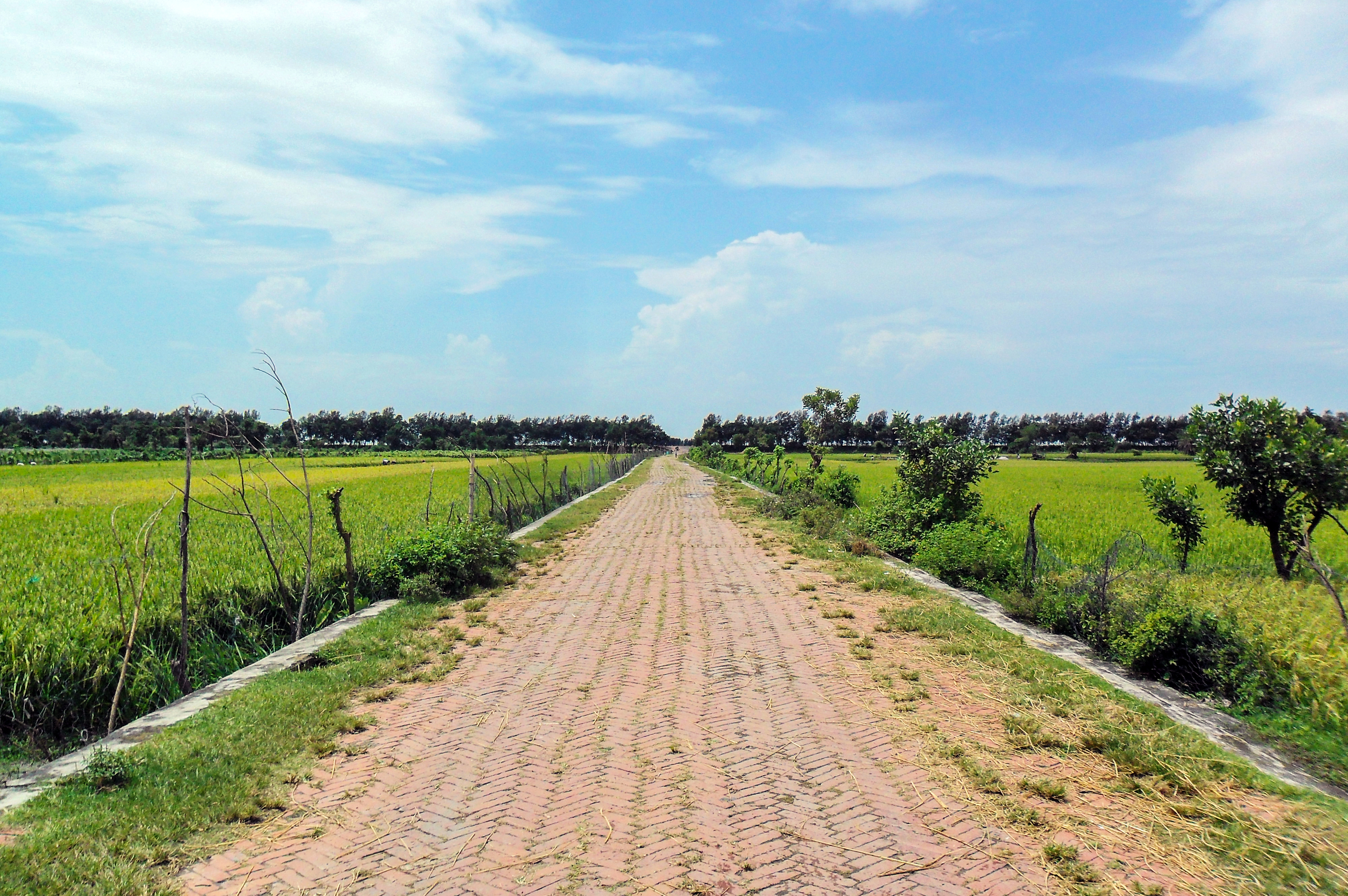
Ananda Bazar Road

Anandabazar is a coastal area located at Halishahar, near Bay of Bengal. As of 2014, the Chittagong Port Authority (CPA) was also starting a process for developing a Bay Terminal on about 1000 acres of land along the coastal area at Anandabazar, near the Port of Chittagong.

Anandabazar post office and Ananda Bazar Government Primary School are also located in this place. There is a bus terminal named Anandabazar Bus Terminal.

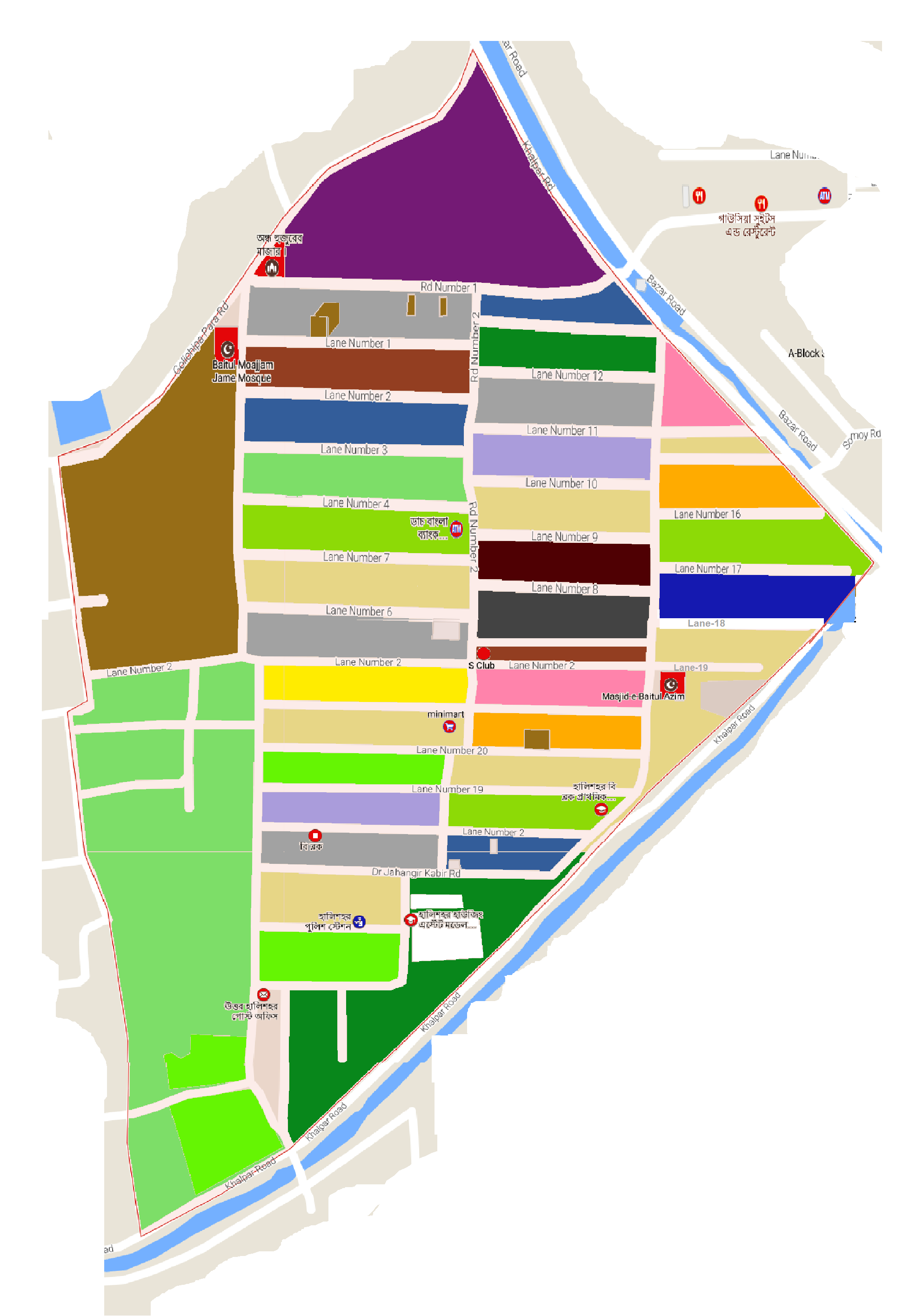
Halishahar B-Block Map

=== Halishahar A-Block ===
This is one of the largest and densely populated area of Halishahar Thana. It is under 11 No. Ward of Chittagong City Corporation. Famous BDR field/ Home ground of Bengali Kheloyar, SOS, Central Mosque, and some primary schools are situated here.

=== Halishahar B-Block ===
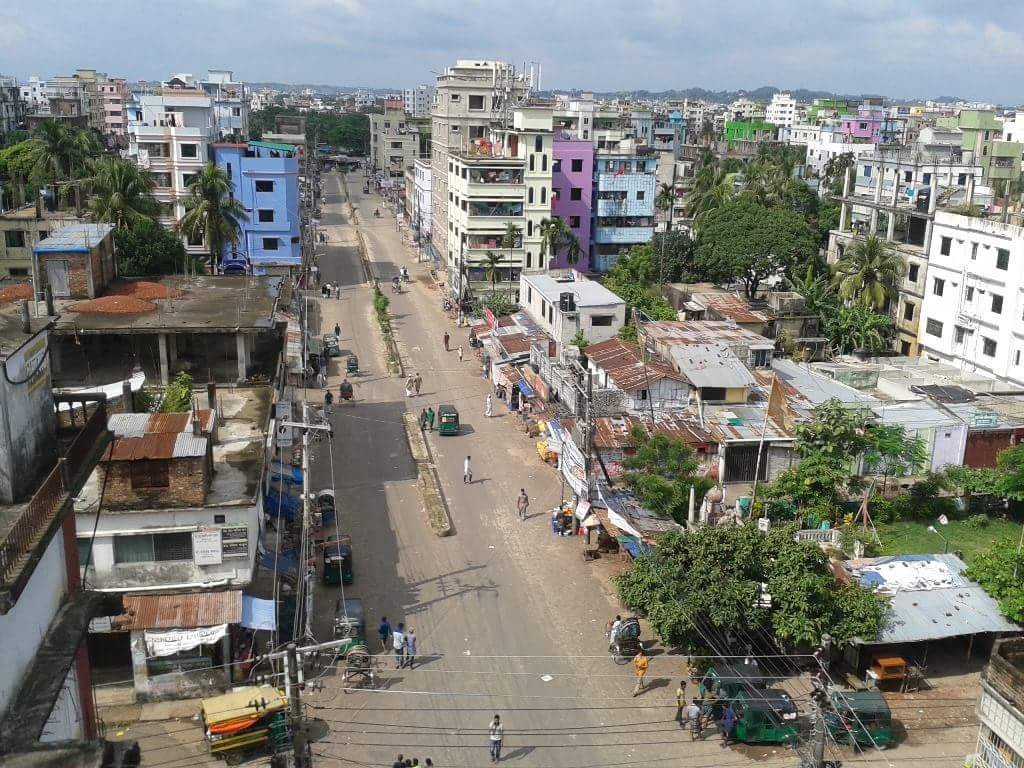
Halishahar B-Block from the top

This is the largest and densely populated area of Halishahar Thana. It is under 26 No. Ward of Chittagong City Corporation . Most of the people here were migrated from Sandwip, Comilla, Noakhali. Halishahar Police Station, North Halishahar Post Office, Baitul Karim Madrasha Complex, Darussunnah Madrasha, B-Block primary school, Ananda Pathshala, Halishahar Public School & College, Halishahar Housing Estate School, Halishahar Mahila College, Bihari Graveyard, Bihari centre, Central Eid-Gah (Shapla Math), S-Club Circle E.T.C are situated here.

=== Halishahar J-Block ===
This is one of the smallest and not overcrowded area of Halishahar Thana. It is under 11 No. South Kattally Ward (Ctg. City Corporation) of Chittagong. It has only 4 lanes. J Block is situated at east side of Halishahar Housing Estate Field.

Address: J Block, Halishahar Housing Estate, Chittagong, Bangladesh. Coordinates: 22.3413, 91.7821.

=== Halishahar H-Block ===
H block is a relatively smaller area in Halishahar and probably most quieter too. It is adjacent to I block. H block falls under Ward No. 25.

=== Halishahar Housing Estate Field (BDR field /HGBK) ===
Housing Estate Field (commonly known as BDR Field and also referred to as the Home Ground of Bangali Kheloyar) is a public field located in Halishahar, Chittagong, Bangladesh, situated between J Block, New A Block, and A Block.

The original name of the field is Housing Estate Field. Over time, it became widely known as BDR Field due to its occasional use by members of the former Bangladesh Rifles (BDR) for training purposes. This led local residents to adopt the name “BDR Field” in common usage.

In 2017, a community-based organization named Bangali Kheloyar was established, centering its activities around the field. The organization later developed into a prominent social group in the area, and as a result, the field is also informally referred to as the Home Ground of Bangali Kheloyar.

The field serves as an important recreational and social hub for the residents of Halishahar. It is regularly used for sports, leisure activities, and informal gatherings. While some individuals also use the space for personal or romantic interactions, such activities are not always viewed favorably by all members of the community.

Various events are held at the field throughout the year, including cricket tournaments, mahfils, and cultural programs. During Eid, the field is also used as an Eidgah (open prayer ground).

During the fascism, the field was occupied by individuals aligned with the ruling authorities, who organized football tournaments there. These activities were not well received by sections of the local community, leading to expressions of dissatisfaction.

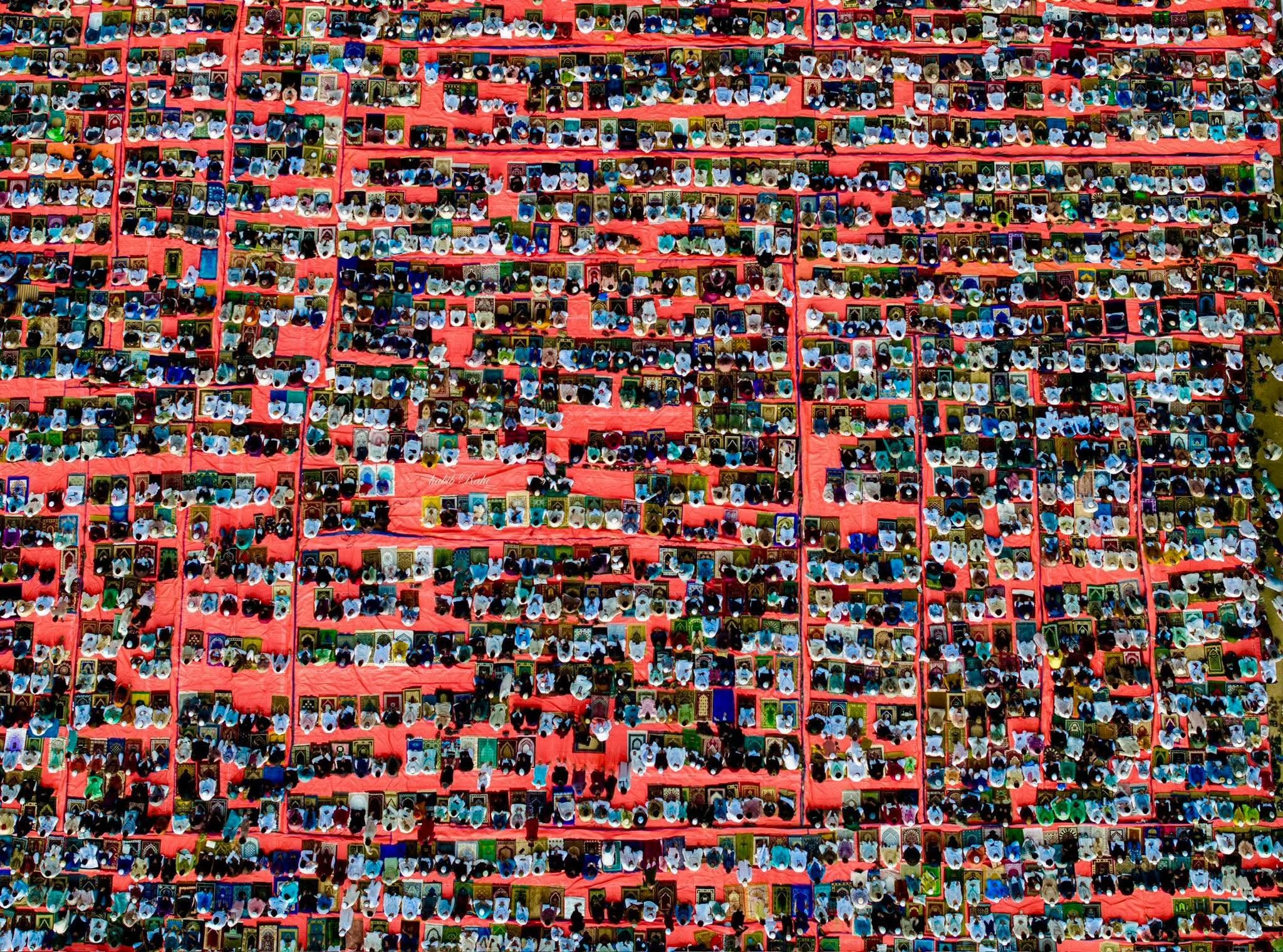
People are praying Eid salah at the BDR Field

== Images ==
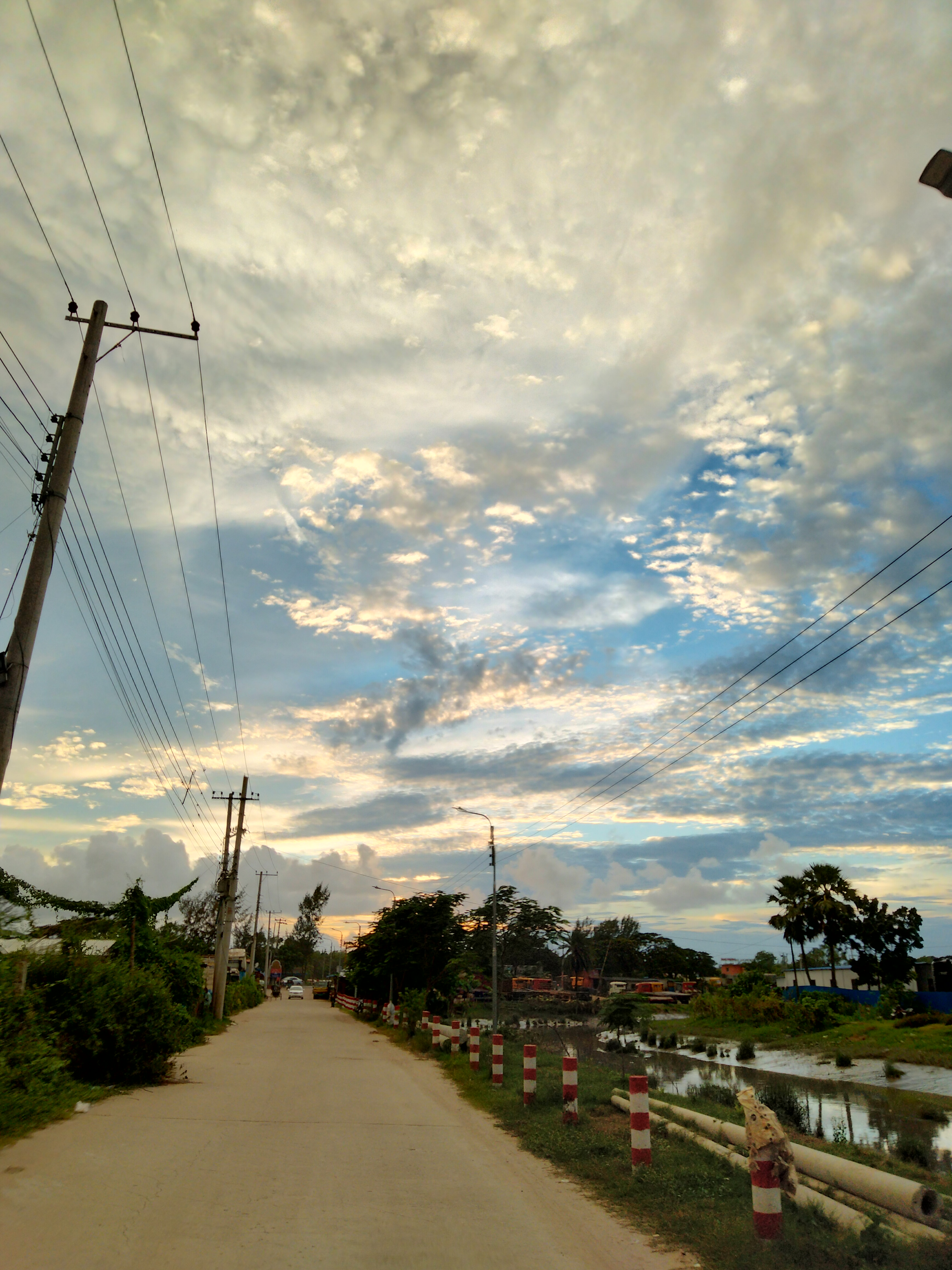
Khal Par, B-Block, Halishahar

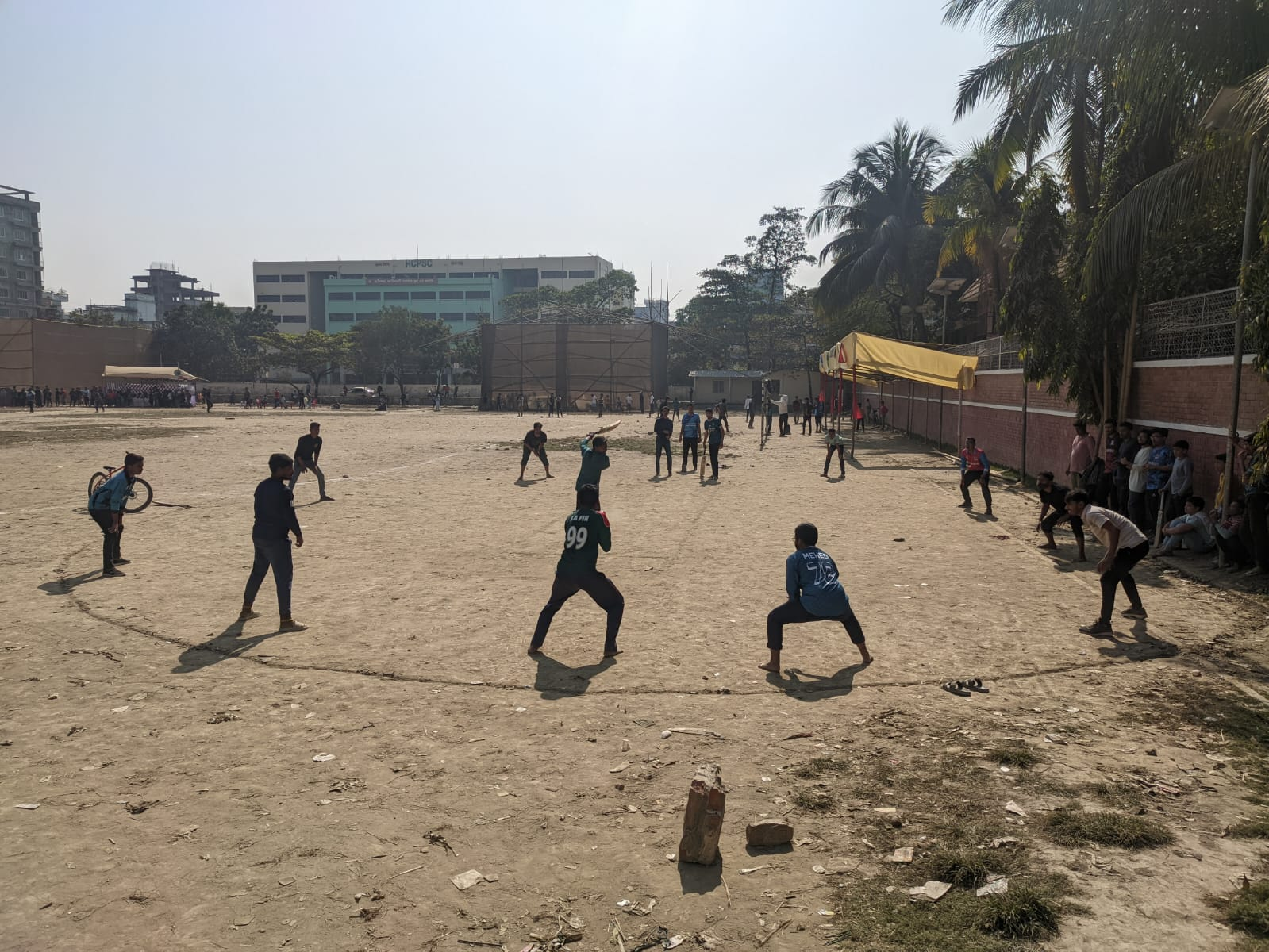
Some students are playing cricket at the BDR field- Captured by Mushfiqul Islam (Rajshahi University student)

== Education ==
=== Colleges ===
- Barrister Sultan Ahmed Chowdhury College
- City Commerce College
- Halishahar Women College

=== Schools ===
- Ananda Bazar Government Primary School
- Asgar Ali Chowdhury Para Primary School
- Garib-E-Newaz High School
- Gunners' English School
- Halishahar Alhaj Mohobbot Ali City Corporation High School
- Housing & Settlement Public School
- Rabeya Basari Girl's High School
- Halishahar Housing Estet Model Primary School
- Halishahr Housing Estet High School
- Halishahar Public School and College
- Halishahar Cantonment Public School & College
- Shaheed Lieutenant General Mushfique Bir Uttam High School
- Shah Amanat Shishu Niketan
- Silver Bells Kindergarten & Girls' High School

== See also ==
- Upazilas of Bangladesh
- Districts of Bangladesh
- Divisions of Bangladesh
- Thanas of Bangladesh
- Demographics of Bangladesh
- Villages of Bangladesh
- Administrative geography of Bangladesh
- Bangladesh Police
- Gram Police Bahini
- Executive magistrate (Bangladesh)
- Bangladesh Ansar
