= Mir Mohammad Nasiruddin =

Bangladeshi politician

- মীর মোহাম্মদ নাসিরুদ্দিন
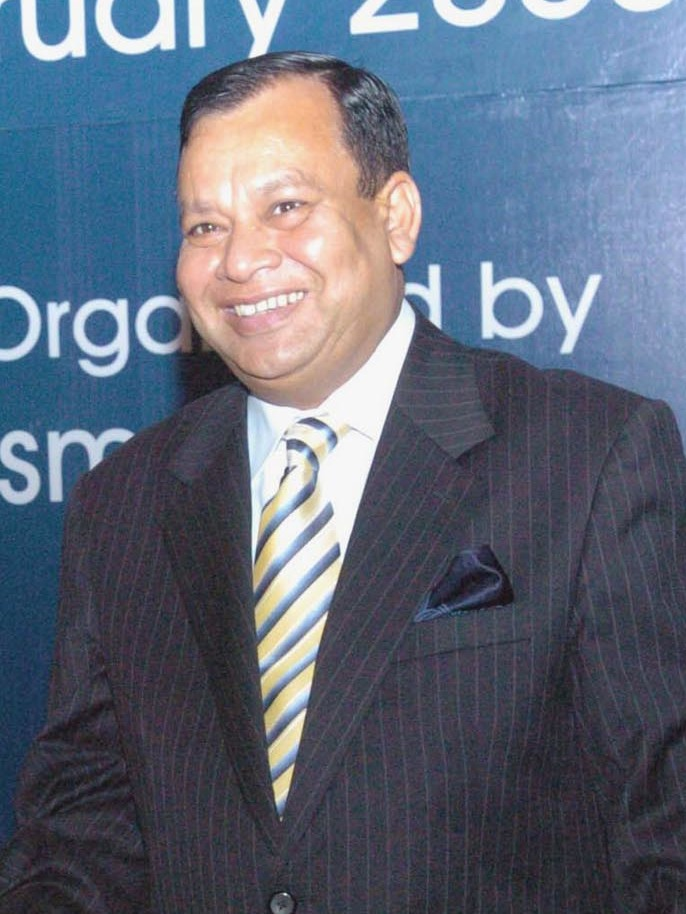
- Nasiruddin in Kolkata (2005)

Minister of State For Civil Aviation and Tourism
- In office 10 October 2001 – 17 November 2005
- Prime Minister: Khaleda Zia
- Preceded by: Sayed Ashraful Islam
- Succeeded by: Mirza Fakhrul Islam Alamgir

2nd Mayor of Chittagong
- In office 1 May 1991 – 20 December 1993
- Preceded by: Mahmudul Islam Chowdhury
- Succeeded by: A. B. M. Mohiuddin Chowdhury

Personal details
- Born: Hathazari, Chittagong, Bengal Province now Bangladesh
- Party: Bangladesh Nationalist Party
- Spouse: Dalia Nazneen Nasir
- Children: Mir Mohammed Helal Uddin
- Occupation: Politician

Mir Mohammad Nasiruddin (Bengali: মীর মোহাম্মদ নাসিরুদ্দিন) is a Bangladesh Nationalist Party (BNP) politician and a former Minister of State for Civil Aviation and Tourism and Mayor of Chittagong.

== Career ==
Mir Nasiruddin served as the State Minister for Ministry of Civil Aviation and Tourism in the second Khaleda Zia cabinet. He was the Four-party Alliance candidate in the 2005 Chittagong mayoral election. He was defeated by the incumbent Mayor A. B. M. Mohiuddin Chowdhury of the Bangladesh Awami League. He is an Adviser of Bangladesh Nationalist Party (BNP) Chairperson and former Prime Minister of Bangladesh, Khaleda Zia. On 5 May 2017, he met the chief of Hefazat-e-Islam Bangladesh, Shah Ahmad Shafi, at Hathazari Madrasa, Chittagong.

== Corruption ==
On 12 July 2007, Nasiruddin was jailed by a special anti-corruption court for corruption along with his son Mir Mohammed Helal Uddin for 13 years. The Bangladesh High Court nullified the sentences in August 2010. On 3 July 2014, the Bangladesh Supreme Court scrapped the High Court order that acquitted him of all charges.
