= Mayor of Chittagong =

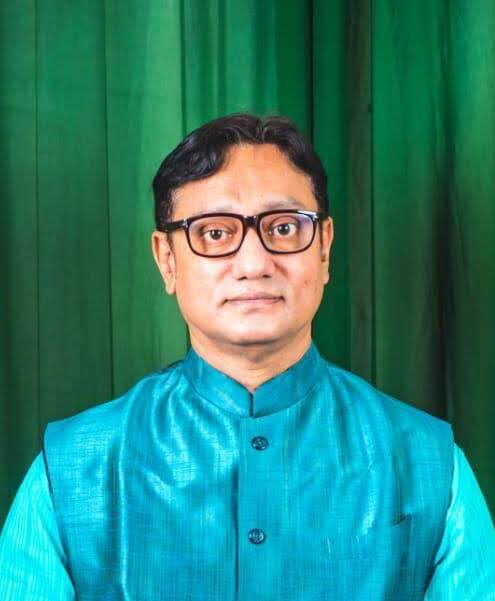
- Incumbent; Dr. Shahadat Hossain since 3 November 2024
- Chattogram City Corporation
- Style: Honourable (formal)
- Type: Council Leader
- Member of: Chattogram City Corporation
- Seat: Nagar Bhaban, Chittagong
- Appointer: Electorate of Chittagong
- Term length: Five years, renewable
- Constituting instrument: The City Corporation act, 2009
- Inaugural holder: Mahmudul Islam Chowdhury
- Formation: 30 September 1989; 37 years ago
- Salary: ৳150000 (US$1,200) per month (incl. allowances)
- Website: www.ccc.gov.bd

The Mayor of Chittagong is the chief elected executive of the Chattogram City Corporation. The Mayor’s office oversees civic services, manages public properties, and coordinates the functions of various government agencies within the city. In addition, the Mayor is responsible for enforcing city corporation regulations and state laws, thereby ensuring good governance and the sustainable development of Chittagong.

The mayor's office is located in the Nagar Bhaban; it has jurisdiction over all 41 wards of the city.

== List of officeholders ==
Political parties

- Bangladesh Awami League
- Bangladesh Nationalist Party
- Jatiya Party (Ershad)

Other factions

- Independent

Status

- Administrator and Acting Mayor

No.	Portrait	Officeholder (birth–death)	Election	Term of office			Designation	Political party	Reference
No.	Portrait	Officeholder (birth–death)	Election	From	To	Period	Designation	Political party	Reference
1		Mahmudul Islam Chowdhury	–	30 September 1989	4 December 1990	1 year, 65 days	Mayor	Jatiya Party (Ershad)	
–		M. A. Bari	–	13 December 1990	11 May 1991	149 days	Administrator	Independent	
2		Mir Mohammad Nasiruddin	–	12 May 1991	20 December 1993	2 years, 222 days	Mayor	Bangladesh Nationalist Party	
–		Omar Farooq	–	21 December 1993	10 March 1994	79 days	Administrator	Independent	
3		A. B. M. Mohiuddin Chowdhury (1944–2017)	1994; 2000; 2005	11 March 1994	29 March 2007	13 years, 18 days	Mayor	Bangladesh Awami League	
–		M. Manjur Alam	—	29 March 2007	4 September 2008	1 year, 159 days	Acting Mayor	Bangladesh Awami League	
3		A. B. M. Mohiuddin Chowdhury (1944–2017)	—	4 September 2008	1 February 2010	1 year, 150 days	Mayor	Bangladesh Awami League	
4		M. Manjur Alam	2010	10 June 2010	6 May 2015	4 years, 330 days	Mayor	Bangladesh Nationalist Party	
5		A. J. M. Nasir Uddin	2015	7 May 2015	4 August 2020	5 years, 89 days	Mayor	Bangladesh Awami League	
–		Mohammed Khorshed Alam Sujon	–	5 August 2020	6 February 2021	185 days	Administrator	Bangladesh Awami League	
6		Rezaul Karim Chowdhury	2021	15 February 2021	19 August 2024	3 years, 217 days	Mayor	Bangladesh Awami League	
–		Md. Tofayel Islam	–	19 August 2024	3 November 2024	76 days	Administrator	Independent	
7		Shahadat Hossain	–	3 November 2024	Present	2 years, 10 days	Mayor	Bangladesh Nationalist Party	

== Elections ==
=== Election result 2021 ===
Chattogram Mayoral Election 2021
Party	Candidate	Votes	%	±%
AL	Rezaul Karim Chowdhury	369,248	84.79	+26.92
BNP	Shahadat Hossain	52,486	12.05	−25.06
IAB	Md. Jannatul Islam	4,980	1.14	−0.04
BIF	M. A. Matin	2,126	0.49	−0.93
Islamic Front	Muhammad Waheed Murad	1,109	0.25	+0.01
Majority		316,762	72.74	+51.98
Turnout		436,543	22.52	−25.38
Registered electors		1,938,706		
AL hold				

=== Election result 2015 ===
Chattogram Mayoral Election 2015
Party	Candidate	Votes	%	±%
AL	A. J. M. Nasir Uddin	475,361	57.87	+14.47
BNP	M. Manjur Alam	304,837	37.11	−17.09
BIF	M. A. Mannan	11,655	1.42	+0.42
IAB	Wazed Hossain	9,868	1.18	+0.44
JP(E)	Solaiman Alam Seth	6,131	0.75	+0.51
Majority		170,524	20.76	+9.96
Turnout		868,664	47.90	−6.61
Registered electors		1,813,600		
AL gain from BNP				

=== Election result 2010 ===
Chattogram Mayoral Election 2010
Party	Candidate	Votes	%	±%
BNP	M. Manjur Alam	479,145	54.20	+11.7
AL	A. B. M. Mohiuddin Chowdhury	383,617	43.40	−14.1
Independent	Mofazzal Hossain	8,813	1.00	N/A
IAB	Rafiq Islam	6,521	0.74	N/A
JP(E)	Solaiman Alam Seth	2,083	0.24	−0.51
Majority		95,528	10.86	−4.14
Turnout		920,570	54.51	+0.88
Registered electors		1,693,954		
BNP gain from AL				

=== Election result 2005 ===
Chattogram Mayoral Election 2005
Party	Candidate	Votes	%	±%
AL	A. B. M. Mohiuddin Chowdhury	350,891	57.50	N/A
BNP	Mir Mohammad Nasiruddin	259,410	42.50	N/A
Majority		91,481	15.00	N/A
Turnout		610,301	53.63	N/A
Registered electors		1,138,318		
AL hold				
