= A. B. M. Mohiuddin Chowdhury =

Bangladeshi politician

Chattal Bir A. B. M. Mohiuddin Chowdhury
- এ. বি. এম. মহিউদ্দিন চৌধুরী
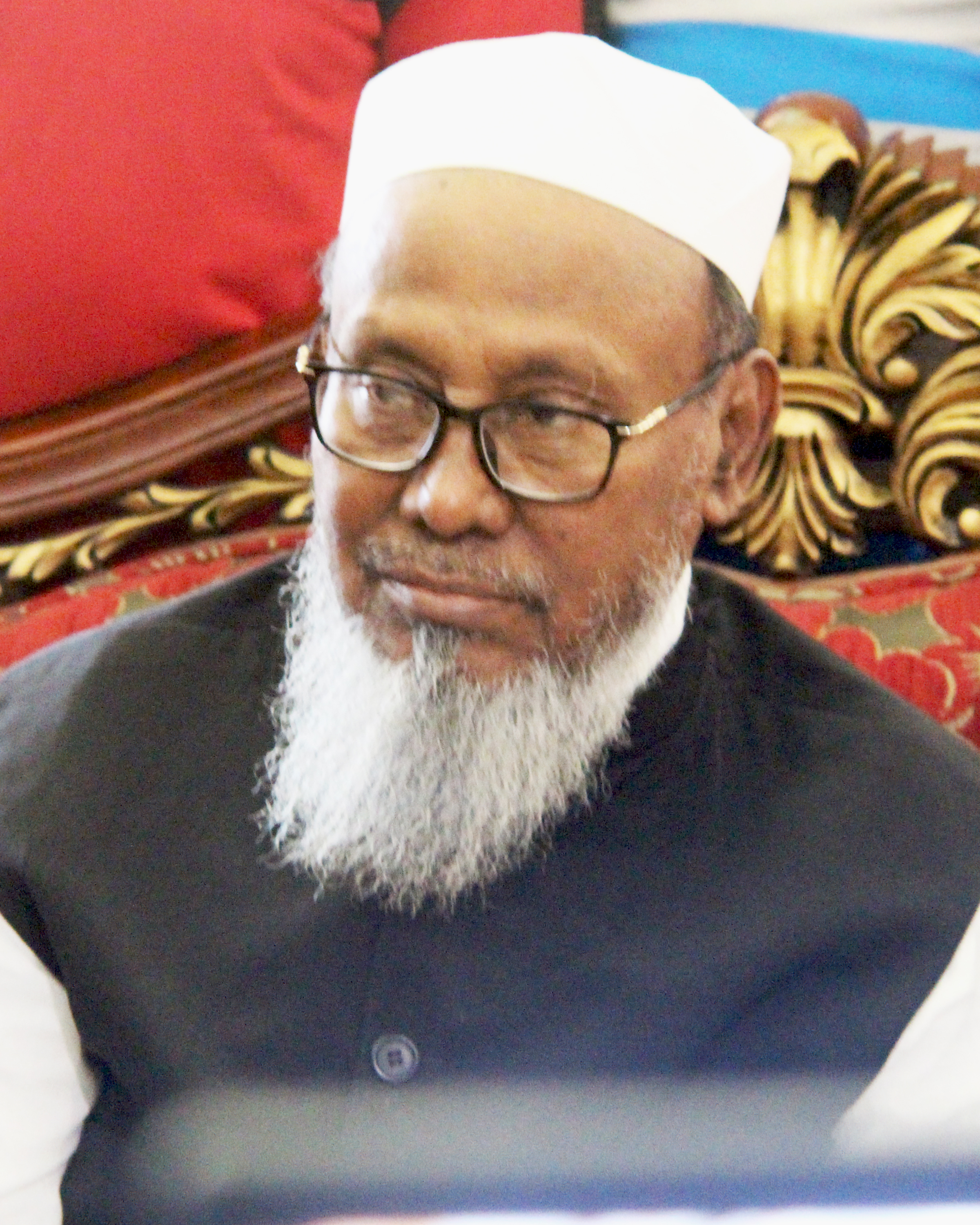
- Mohiuddin in 2017

3rd Mayor of Chittagong
- In office 4 September 2008 – 1 February 2010
- Preceded by: M. Manjur Alam; as Acting Mayor
- Succeeded by: M. Manjur Alam
- In office 11 March 1994 – 29 March 2007
- Preceded by: Mir Mohammed Nasiruddin
- Succeeded by: M. Manjur Alam; as Acting Mayor

Personal details
- Born: 1 December 1944 Gohira, Raozan Upazila, Chittagong, Bengal Presidency, British India
- Died: 15 December 2017 (aged 73) Chittagong, Bangladesh
- Resting place: Chasma Hill Graveyard, Chittagong
- Spouse: Shaheda Mohiuddin (m. 1982; died 1986) Hasina Mohiuddin (m. 1987)
- Children: Mohibul; Borhanul
- Education: University of Chittagong; Government City College, Chattogram; Chittagong Polytechnic Institute

A. B. M. Mohiuddin Chowdhury (Bengali: এ বি এম মহিউদ্দিন চৌধুরী; 1 December 1944 – 15 December 2017) was a Bangladesh Awami League politician. He was the mayor of Chittagong, the second-largest city in Bangladesh, for three consecutive terms.

== Early life ==
Chowdhury was born on 1 December 1944 in Gohira village, Raozan upazila, Chittagong District, East Bengal, British Raj (now Bangladesh). His father was Hosen Ahmed Chowdhury, a railway officer, and his mother was Bedowra Begum. After completing his SSC he joined Government City College, Chittagong in 1962. He transferred the same year to Chittagong Polytechnic Institute. He faced expulsion from the institute due to his active participation in student politics. He returned to Chittagong City College in 1965 and graduated in 1967. He started post graduate course at the University of Chittagong with a major in Islamic history and culture. He withdrew from his master's degree program before completing it.

== Career ==
Chowdhury was the general secretary of the Chittagong city unit of Chhatra League. He was leader of Sarbadaliya Chhatra Sangram Parishad, and organised a strike in Chittagong on 1 March 1971. After the 7 March 1971 speech by Bangabandhu Sheikh Mujibur Rahman. Chowdhury and other student activists acquired firearms from the Rifles Club and an arms depot in Majhirghat. He was arrested by the Pakistan Army soon but was released after he pretended to be insane in prison. He moved to India to train for the Mukti Bahini and was appointed a commander in the East Mount Battalion after his training. After the assassination of Sheikh Mujibur Rahman, he formed a Mujib Bahini unit to resist the Khondaker Mostaq Ahmad government. He was arrested by the government. He fled to India on being released.

Chowdhury was elected mayor of Chittagong in 1994. He was the first elected mayor of Chittagong city. He defeated Mir Mohammed Nasiruddin, the Bangladesh Nationalist Party candidate and previous mayor who was appointed to his post, to win the election by 16,000 votes. He won his second election in 2000 easily after the election was boycotted by Bangladesh Nationalist Party. In 2005 the Bangladesh Nationalist Party government gave its full support to Mir Mohammed Nasiruddin. Prime Minister Khaleda Zia campaigned for Nasiruddin. Tarique Zia lived and campaigned in Chittagong for a week. Chowdhury still was able to secure an election win. He became the president of the Chittagong city Awami League in 2006. He was elected mayor three times. He served as mayor for 17 years until defeated by Bangladesh Nationalist Party candidate Manjurul Alam in 2010.

=== Development work ===
During Chowdhury's term he established five maternity clinics. The hospital has specialized neonatal care and advanced gynaecological surgery facilities. The hospital is overseen by two consultant gynaecologists and a team of doctors.

Chowdhury was the first mayor in Bangladesh to establish a private university – Premier University, Chittagong, which was hosted at the premises of Chittagong City Corporation. After he took office, the corporation established nine postsecondary colleges, computer-training centres, a midwife training centre, a healthcare-technology training centre (the first in Bangladesh to train in the operation of health care technology including radiology and radiography) and eight night colleges to expand adult literacy. The Chittagong city authority also manages eight Hindu religious education centers (known as Sanskrit Toll) to provide religious education in Sanskrit to minority students.

=== Arrest in 2007 ===
After the army-backed government assumed power in Bangladesh in January 2007, Mohiuddin and other politicians in the country were arrested in an overnight raid on 7 March. He was incarcerated (mostly incommunicado) in various prisons in the country. When first arrested, unlike other arrested leaders he was taken to a remote jail in Bandarban (a district of Chittagong Hill Tracts).

Whilst in prison, Chowdhury's daughter was diagnosed with blood cancer in Thailand. He was detained without trial for 21 months, the government did not release him from prison to see his dying daughter. He was finally released from prison on 8 October 2008 following a High Court order. Despite his release, the army-backed government retained his passport and did not allow him to fly to Thailand in time to see his daughter. On 17 October, when the government finally permitted him to fly abroad and just minutes before he boarded the aircraft en route to Bangkok, Chowdhury's daughter died.

== Death ==
Chowdhury died at 3:00 am on 15 December 2017. He was buried in his family graveyard at Chashma Hill with an honor guard performed by Bangladesh Police.
