= Bengal–Mrauk U War (1512–1516) =

16th-century battle

Date	1512–1516
Location	Chittagong and Northern Arakan
Result	Bengal victory: Kingdom of Mrauk U returns to being a vassal of the Bengal Sultanate
Territorial changes	Bengali sovereignty over Chittagong and Northern Arakan

Belligerents
Bengal Sultanate	Kingdom of Mrauk U

Commanders and leaders
Alauddin Husain Shah; Nasiruddin Nasrat Shah; Paragal Khan; Chhuti Khan	Min Raza of Mrauk-U; Gazapati; Min Saw O Thazata

The Bengal–Mrauk U War (1512–1516) was a conflict in the 16th century between the Bengal Sultanate and the Kingdom of Mrauk U.

== Background ==
After the Reconquest of Arakan, the Kingdom of Mrauk U was established as a Bengali protectorate. By the 16th century, Mrauk U challenged Bengali hegemony and declared independence several times. Southeastern Bengal, including the port of Chittagong, often fell under Arakanese rule.

== Conflict ==
During Alauddin Husain Shah's expeditions to Tripura, the ruler of Arakan helped Dhanya Manikya, the ruler of Tripura and expelled Husain Shah's officers from Chittagong. In 1513, Husain Shah assigned the charge of Arakan expedition to Paragal Khan. Nasrat, the crown prince of Bengal was placed in overall command. On Nasrat's order, Paragal Khan advanced from his base on the Feni River. The expedition of territory to the western bank of Kaladan river was placed under his governorship administration. The hostilities probably ended in 1516, when Mrauk U recognized Bengali sovereignty over Chittagong and northern Arakan. As a result of the conflict, Mrauk U again became a vassal of the Bengal Sultanate. Nasrat renamed Chittagong to Fatehabad, City of Victory. This is also corroborated by Portuguese adventurer Joao de Silvera who, landing in 1517, proclaimed that Arakan was a vassal state of Bengal Sultanate.

== Aftermath ==
After the war, Paragal Khan was appointed the governor of Chittagong region. Paragal Khan with his son, Chhuti Khan, developed a military garrison in Paragalpur. The site was chosen to defend the Bengal Sultanate's borders from pirates from the Kingdom of Mrauk U in the South. It was named Laskarpur (after Laskar soldiers) before being renamed Paragalpur after Paragal Khan. Syed Sultan, noted medieval poet, was notably from Paragalpur.

== See also ==
- Mrauk U invasion of Chittagong
- History of Chittagong
