= Names of Chittagong =

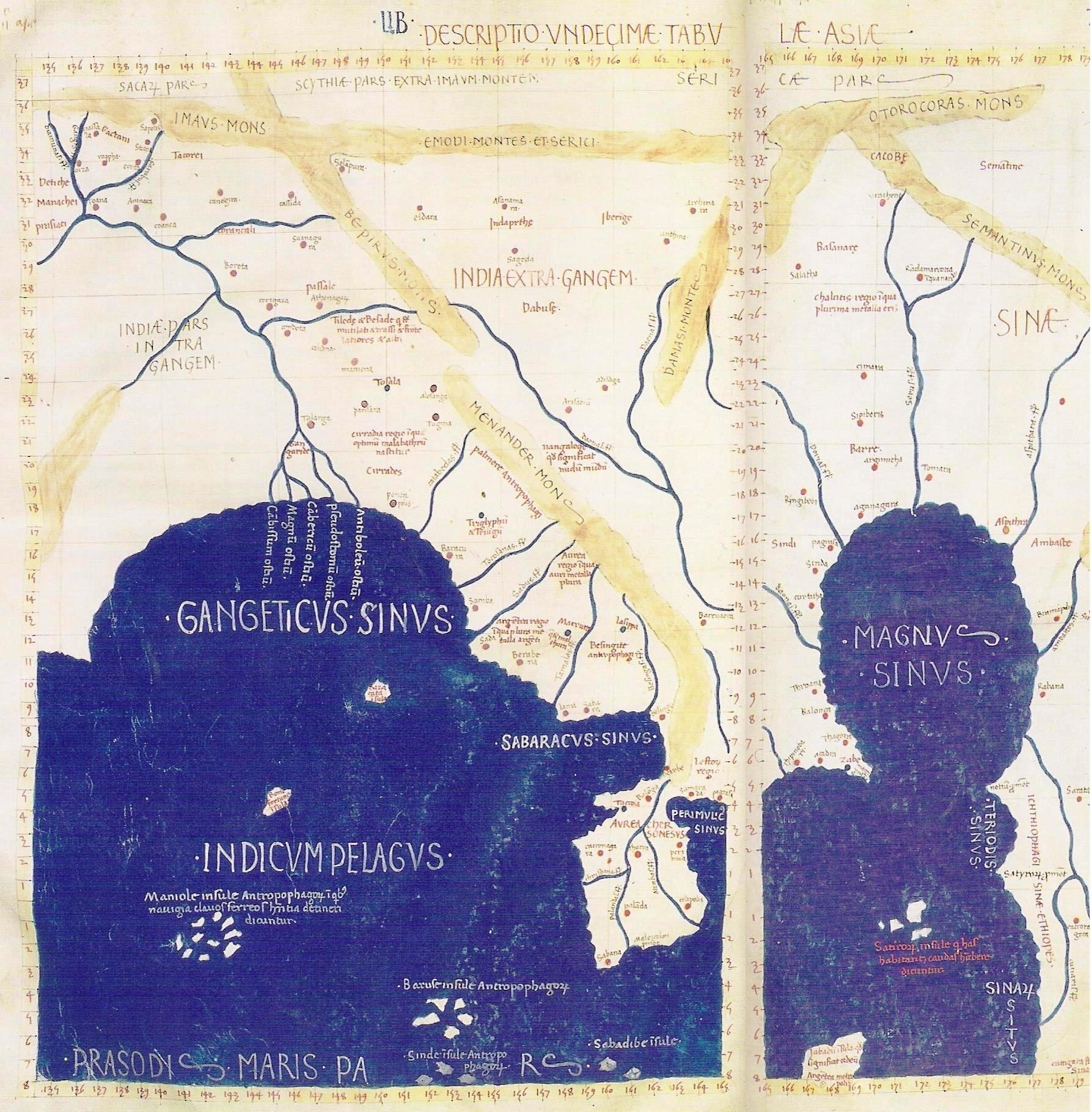
Detail of East and Southeast Asia in Ptolemy's world map. Gulf of the Ganges (Bay of Bengal) left, Southeast Asian peninsula in the center, South China Sea right, with "Sinae" (China).

The city known in English as Chittagong has undergone changes in both its official and popular names worldwide. The choice of names stems from the Chittagonian culture, language and colonisation. A reason for the city having a number of names is due to the diverse history of Chittagong.

== Bengali and Chittagonian names ==
The Bengali word for Chittagong, Chottogram (চট্টগ্রাম), has the suffix "-gram" (গ্রাম) meaning village in Standard Bengali, and the word "chotto" could be from "chati" meaning lamp. Thus, many people continue to call the city, চাটিগ্রাম (Chatigram) or in the Chittagonian language, চাটিগাঁও (Chatigaon), গাঁও (Gaon) meaning village. Other names include চাটগাঁ (Chatga), চৈট্ট্যভূমি (Chaityabhumi) and চট্টলা (Chottola). Names such as Chatagao are still used in Hindi, Urdu, Punjabi, Chittagonian and other Bengali dialects today. The name Sitagang is also common in Eastern dialects with "gang" also meaning village.

== Arabic names ==
Arab traders saw well-developed currency, banking and shipping in Chittagong during the 9th century. Early cosmopolitan Muslims established dominance over the port as an entrepot of maritime trade. Geographically, the Ganges Delta is located in Bengal. The Arabic word Shaṭṭ (شط) meaning delta, could also be an etymology of Chittagong, the Ganges delta, Shaṭṭ Al-Ghānj (شط الغانج). The Moroccan traveller, Ibn Battuta referred to the Port of Chittagong as Sadkāwān (سدكاوان). However, currently the Arabic word for Chittagong is Jātjām (جاتجام) which is derived from Chātgām (چاتگام), the Persian name of the city.

== Burmese names ==
Chittagong was an important port city in the Kingdom of Mrauk U, after Arakan's independence from the Bengal Sultanate. The Burmese tradition of the city's etymology, is that an Arakanese king, invading in the 9th century, gave the city the name Tsit-ta-gung (စစ်တကောင်း; war's (spear) head / limit of conquest).

== Portuguese and Dutch names ==
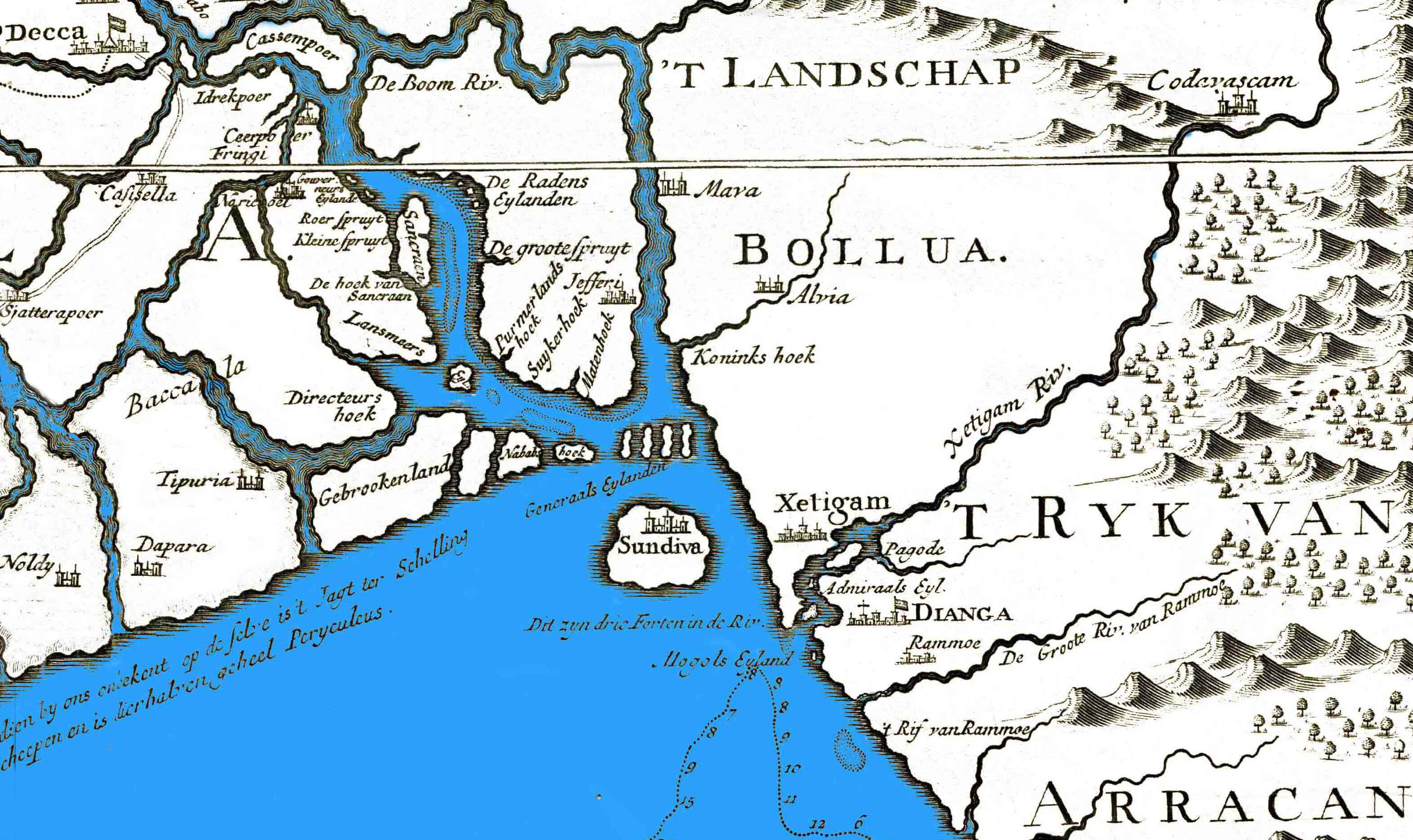
Early Dutch map of Bengal

The Portuguese referred to the port city as Porto Grande de Bengala, which meant "the Grand Harbor of Bengal". The term was often simplified as Porto Grande. Other names include Xatigan from the Dutch, Xetigam, and Chatigão from an early Bengali name.

== Historical names and nicknames ==
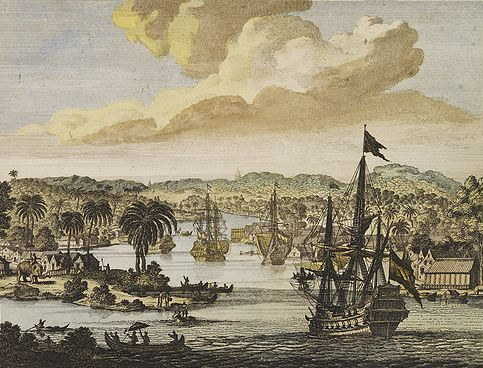
Dutch ships visiting Chittagong during the Mughal period in 1702

The Mughal conquest of Chittagong re-established Bengali control and ushered an era of stability and trade. The city was renamed as Islamabad (City of Islam) and continues to be used in the old city.

According to historian Abdul Hak Chaudhuri, in ancient Tibetan texts, the city was known as Jvalan'dhdra, and in Arab geographical texts as Samandar.

The city is known in Bangladesh as বাংলাদেশের প্রবেশদ্বার / Bangladesher Probeshdaar (Bangladesh's Gateway) as well as বাংলাদেশের বাণিজ্যিক রাজধানী / Bangladesher Banijjik Rajdhani (Bangladesh's Commercial Capital).

== See also ==
- History of Chittagong
- Port of Chittagong
- Portuguese Bengal
- Dutch Bengal
