= Darul Adalat =

Historic site in Chittagong

Portuguese Building
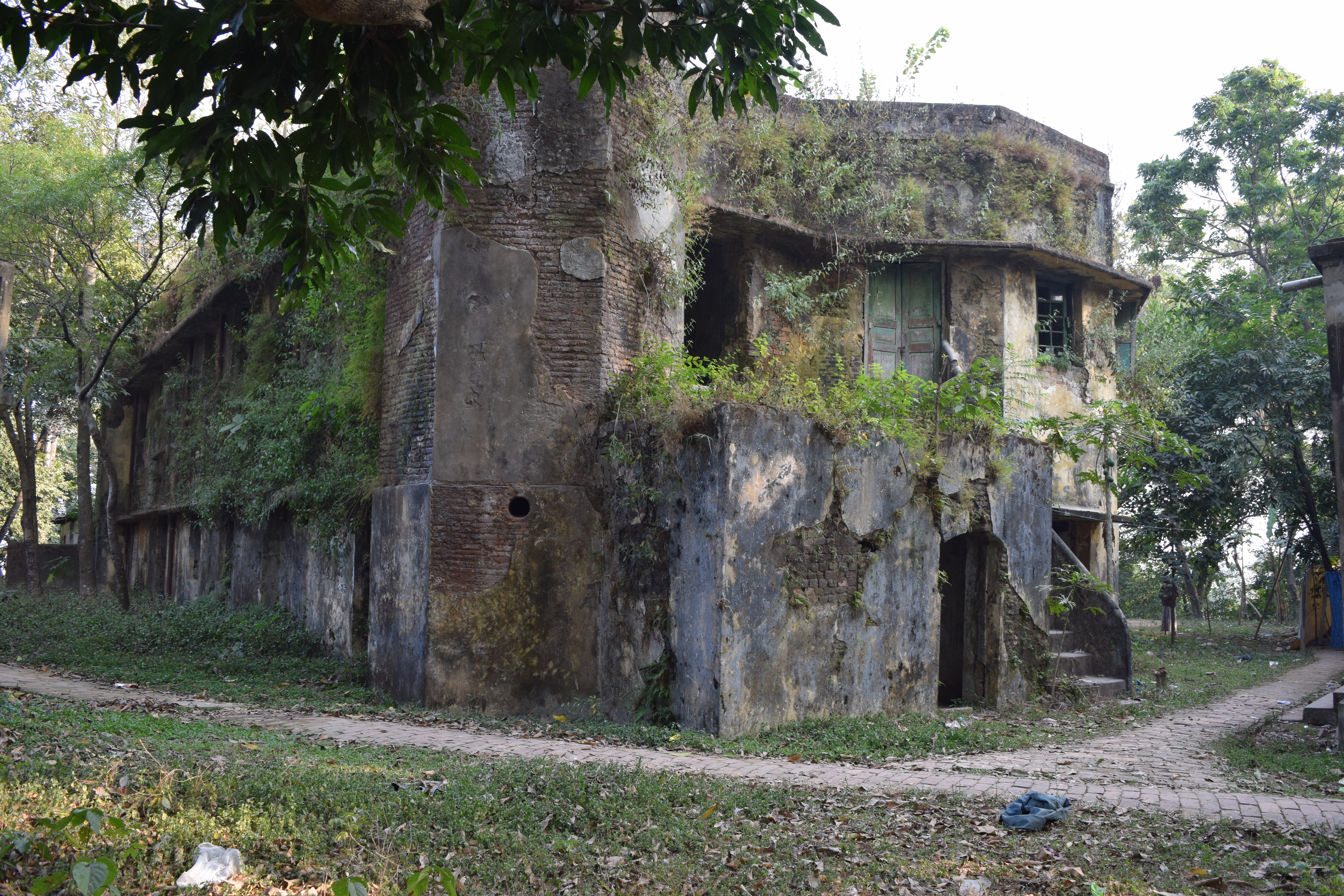
- Darul Adalat in 2019
- Former names: Darul Adalat

General information
- Location: Government Hazi Mohammad Mohsin College, College Road, Chawkbazar, Chittagong
- Town or city: Chittagong
- Country: Bangladesh
- Current tenants: Chittagong City Corporation
- Closed: 2002
- Owner: Government Hazi Mohammad Mohsin College, Chittagong

Technical details
- Floor count: Two

Darul Adalat (Bengali: দারুল আদালত, romanized: Dārul Ādālôt, lit. 'Court Building'), better known as the Portuguese Building (Bengali: পর্তুগিজ ভবন, romanized: Pôrtugij Bhôbôn), is a historic landmark located in Chittagong, Bangladesh. It was the first court building of the city.

== Location ==
The building is located at the top of the hill besides the Collage Road in Chawkbazar, Chittagong. The building is situated in the western side of the Hazi Mohammad Mohsin College campus. One can go to the building through the main college campus.

== History ==
According to the locals, the building was made around 1666 during the Portuguese settlement in Chittagong, although alternative sources say that the building was made in 1761 during the Company rule. According to the historians, the age of the building is approximately 400 years.

The building was the administrative fort and centre of social activities of the Portuguese settlers. It is said that there was a tunnel under the building to the Karnaphuli River, through which looted goods were brought to the building. The Portuguese used this route leaving the city. It is said that they sealed off the tunnel while fleeing the city following the conquest of Chittagong to the Mughals. It is also said that there was a secret room under the building, where goods and weapons were stored. During the Portuguese rule, dances, songs and entertainment were organized here every night.

In 19th century, the building was used as the office of Chittagong Madrasah. In 1879, the Madrasah authorities purchased the building in 30 thousands taka from the British government. Later in 1927, following the establishment of Mohsin College, the building was used as a students hostel.

In 2002, the college authorities declared the building as risky and completely shut down the academic & administrative works in the building. Currently entering the building is prohibited. By 2013, it had fallen into disrepair and was in danger of being demolished to make way for a library.

== Architecture ==
In 2009, a survey was conducted by the college authorities & the Department of Archaeology of the Government of Bangladesh, which found that the building's architecture does not match with any of the existing architectural patterns of the Chittagong region, such as Mughal, British or modern, thus, the survey concluded in identifying the structure as Portuguese.

The building is two-storied, and has 20 rooms. Every floor has a central room, around which other rooms are arranged. One of the three staircases in the building is a spiral staircase, which is typical to the medieval European architecture. The walls are 10 inches thick, and only bricks were used in the construction. There are two small domes on the roof of the building, from which the guards could keep an eye on the entire city.

== Gallery ==
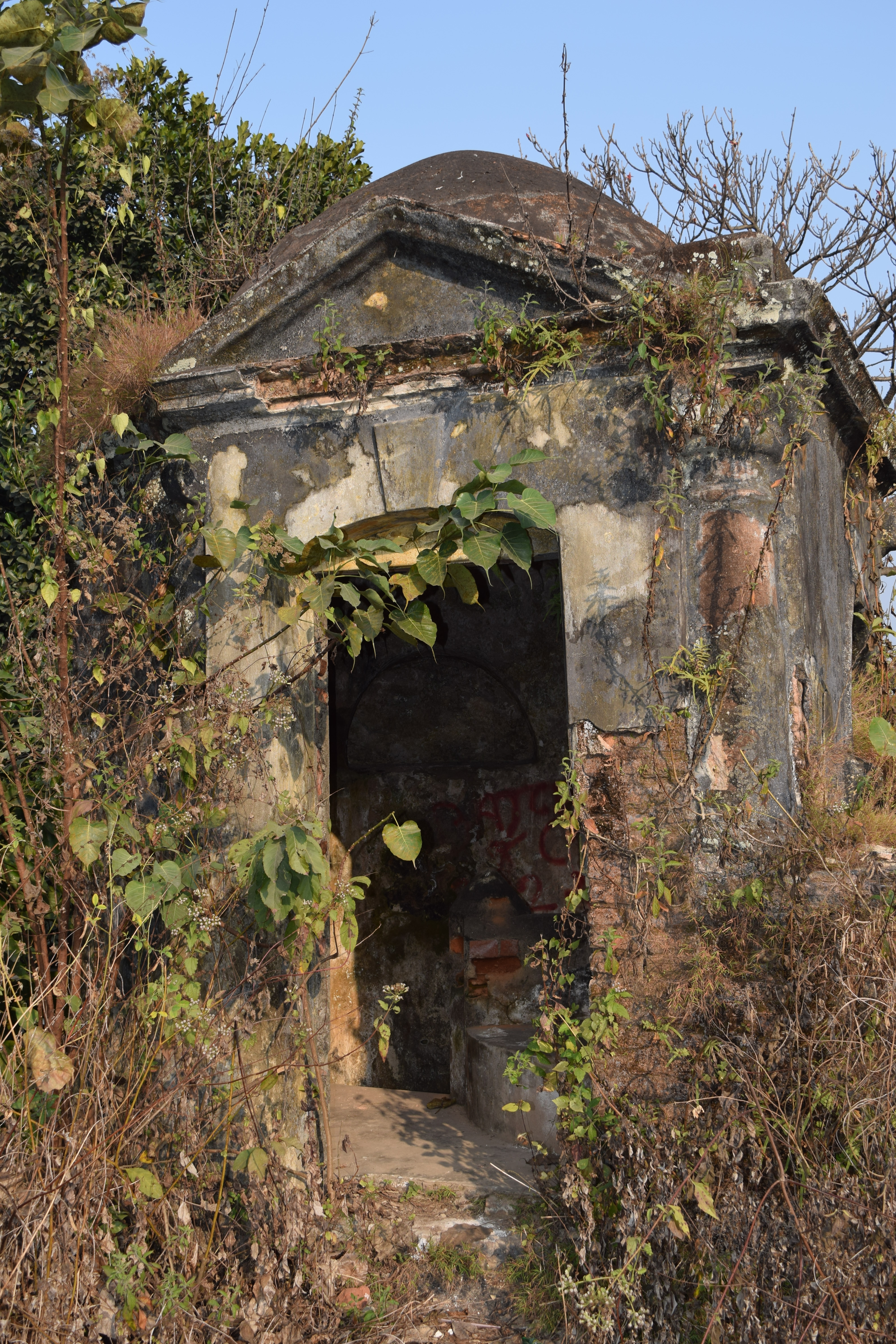

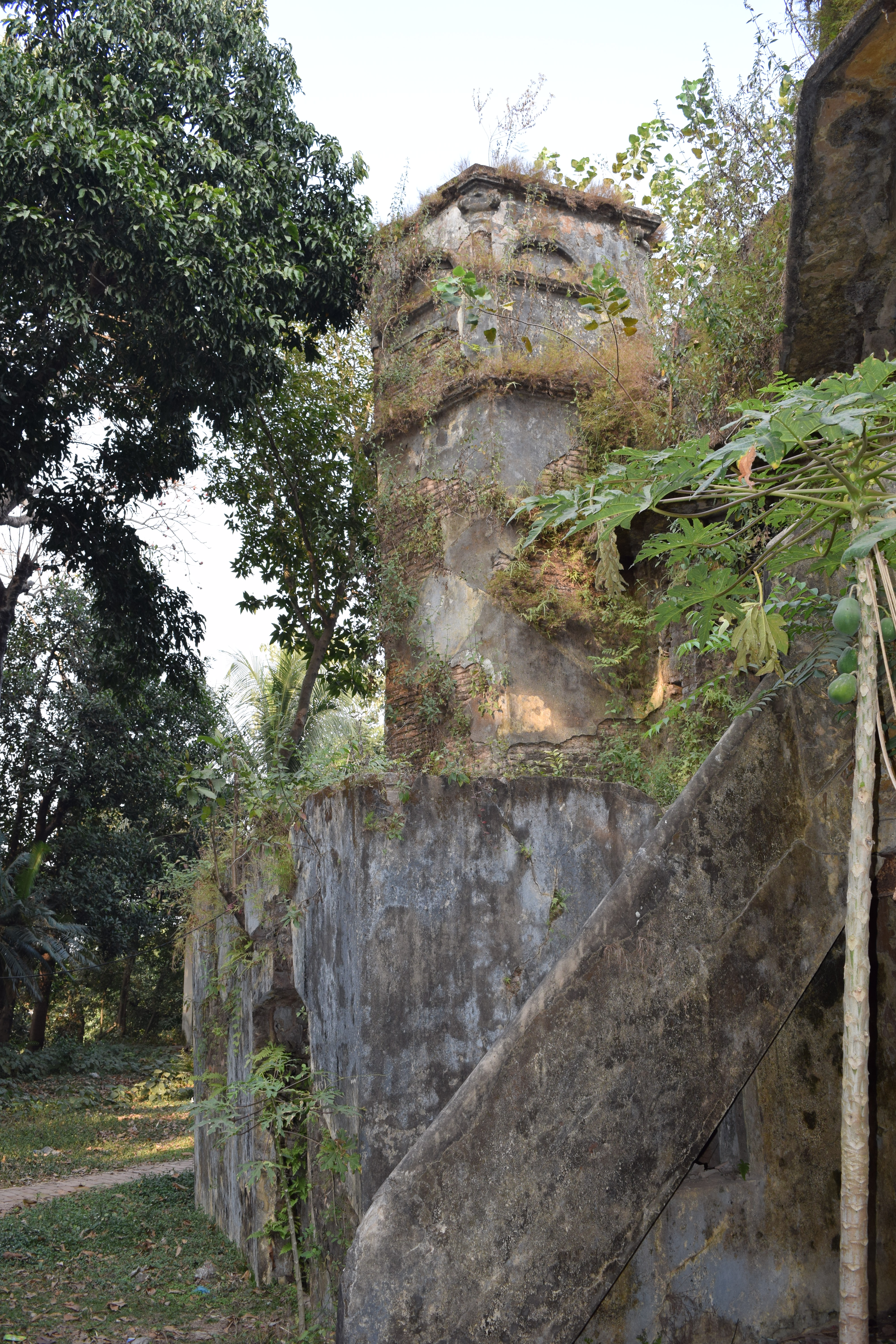

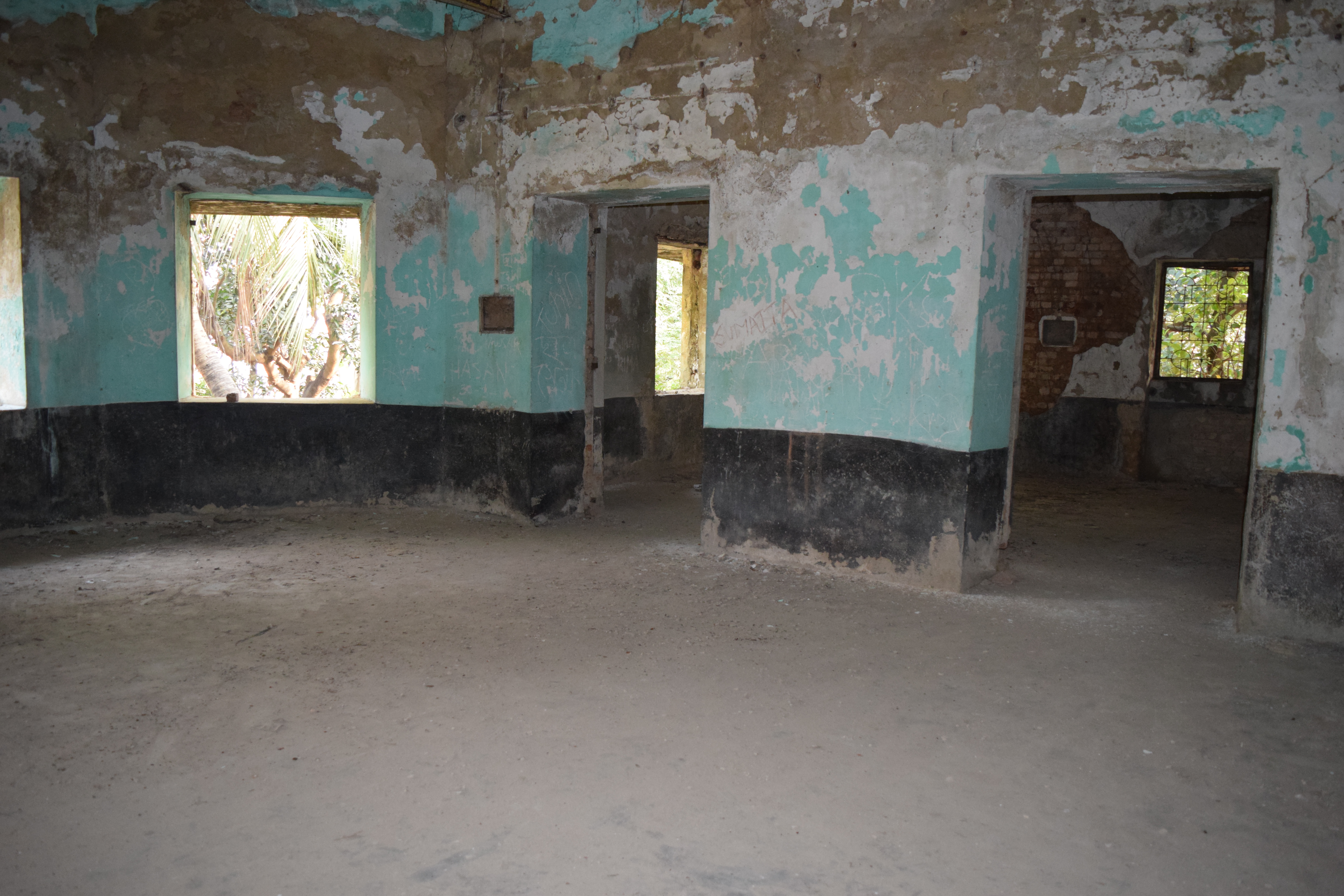

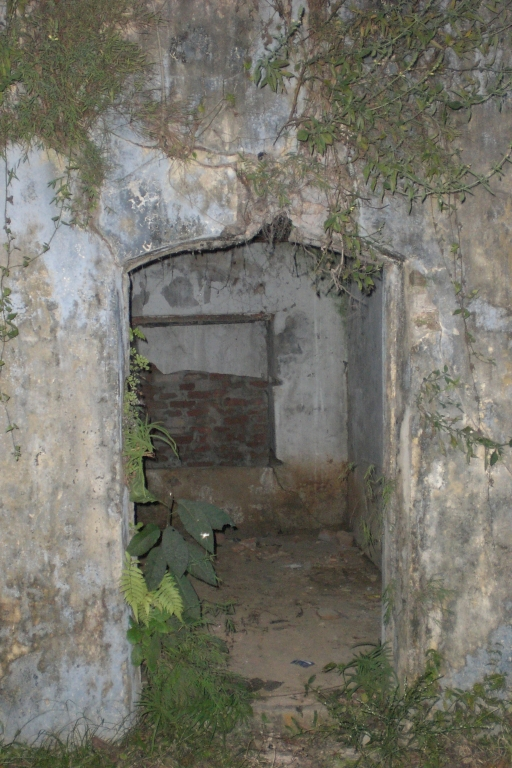

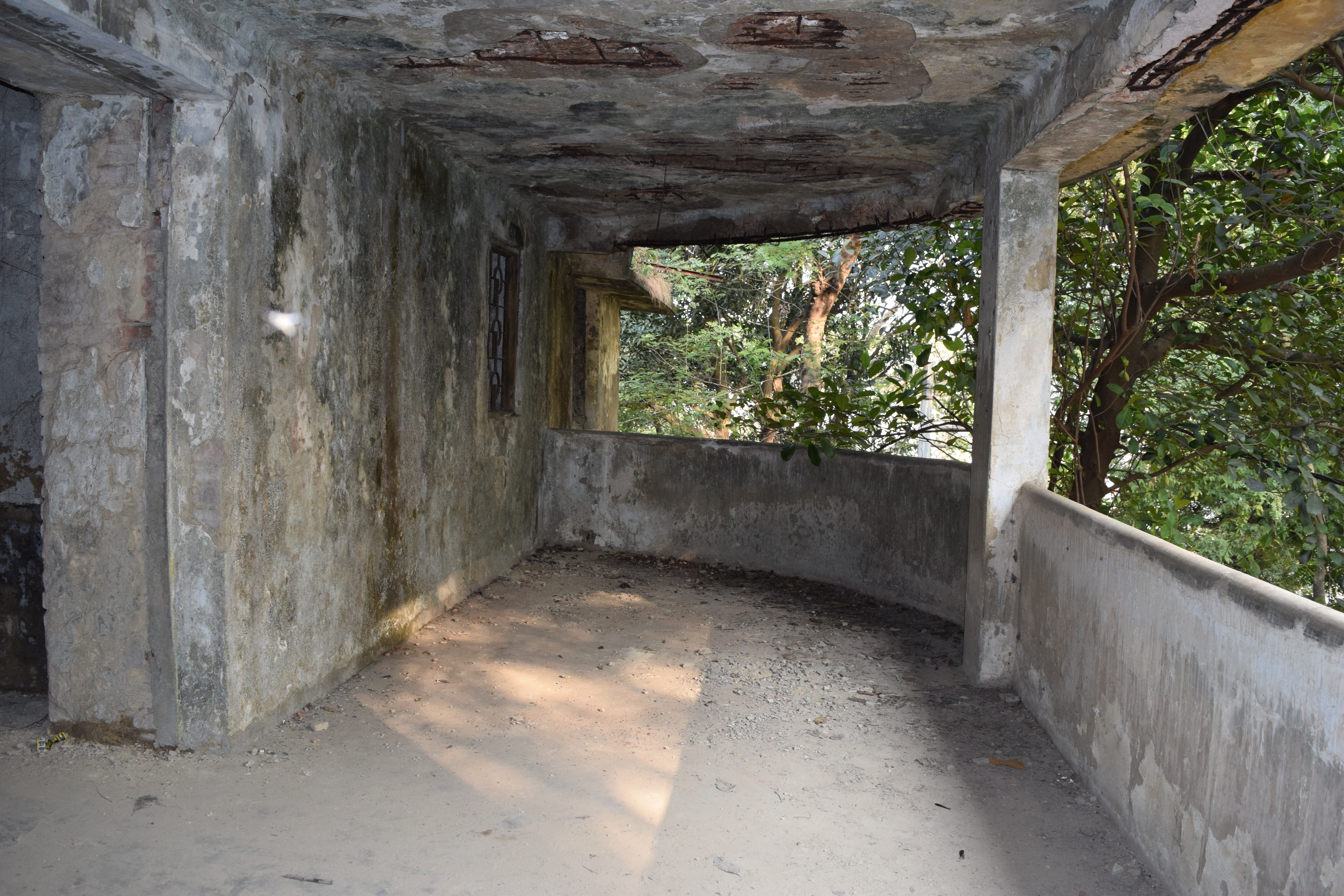

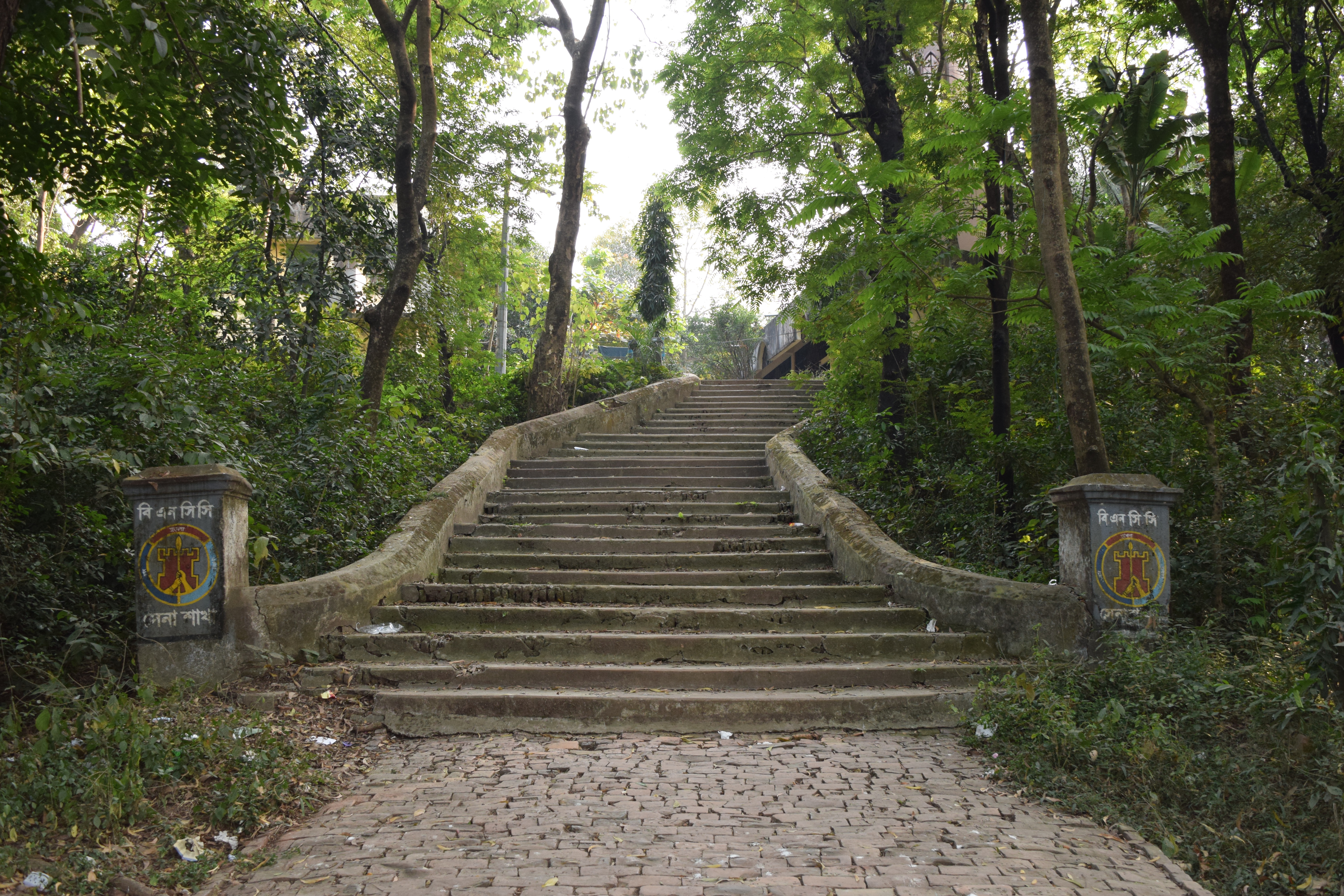

== See also ==
- History of Chittagong
- Portuguese India
- Portuguese settlement in Chittagong
- List of archaeological sites in Bangladesh
