= Chandgaon Thana =

Thana in Chattogram Division, Bangladesh

Chandgaon চান্দগাঁও
- Thana
- Location in Bangladesh
- Coordinates: 22°23′N 91°52′E
- Country: Bangladesh
- Division: Chittagong Division
- District: Chittagong District

Area
  - Total: 32.14 km^{2} (12.41 sq mi)
- Elevation: 15 m (49 ft)

Population (2022)
  - Total: 312,244
  - Density: 6,834/km^{2} (17,700/sq mi)
- Time zone: UTC+6 (BST)
- Postal code: 4212
- Area code: 031

Chandgaon (Bengali: চান্দগাঁও) is a thana of Chattogram District in Chattogram Division, Bangladesh. It comprises the Chandgoan Residential Area and the Kalurghat Industrial Area.

== Geography ==
Chandgaon Thana is located at 22.3833°N 91.8667°E. It has 40,888 households and a total area of 32.14 km^{2}.

== Demographics ==
Religions in Chandgaon Thana (2022)
Religion	Percent
Islam	87.24%
Hinduism	9.63%
Buddhism	2.92%
Other or not stated	0.21%

According to the 2022 Bangladeshi census, Chandgaon Thana had 77,818 households and a population of 312,244. 8.09% of the population were under 5 years of age. Chandgaon had a literacy rate (age 7 and over) of 83.70%: 85.05% for males and 82.30% for females, and a sex ratio of 103.82 males for every 100 females.

According to the 1991 Bangladesh census, Chandgaon had a population of 219,641, of whom 119,069 were aged 18 or older. Males constituted 56.4% of the population, and females 43.6%. Chandgaon had an average literacy rate of 46.5% (7+ years), against the national average of 32.4%.

== Points of interest ==
Mini Bangladesh is an amusement park located in the area.

== Administration ==
Chandgaon has,

- 6 Unions/Wards
- 14 Mauzas/Mahallas

The postcode is 4212. The current commissioner of the Chandgaon ward is Esrarul Haque Esrar under Chittagong City Corporation.

== Education ==
- Bakalia Government High School
- Hazera Taju Degree College
- CDA Public School and College
- Chittagong Residential School and College
- Merit Bangladesh School and College
- Karnaphuli Public School and College
- Southeast Public School & College

Hajera Taju University College is the only college in the thana. The madrasa education system includes one Kamil madrasa.

== See also ==
- Thanas of Bangladesh
- Upazilas of Bangladesh
- Districts of Bangladesh
- Divisions of Bangladesh
