= Paragalpur =

Village in Chittagong division, Bangladesh

Coordinates: 22.873°N 91.522°E

Paragalpur পরাগলপুর
- Village
- Location in Chittagong Division Location in Bangladesh
- Country: Bangladesh
- Division: Chittagong
- District: Chittagong
- Upazila: Mirsharail
- Union: Zorwarganj
- Time zone: UTC+6 (BST)

Paragalpur (Bengali: পরাগলপুর, Bengali pronunciation: [pɔraɡolpur]) is a historic village in Zorwarganj Union, Mirsharai Upazila, Chittagong District. The descendants of Paragal Khan still reside in the village.

== Etymology ==
The village is named after Paragal Khã, who was an administrator of the Bengal Sultanate in the late 15th century and early 16th century and served as the General of Alauddin Husain Shah.

== History ==
Paragalpur was the administrative center of the Chittagong region during the rule of Alauddin Husain Shah and Nasiruddin Nasrat Shah of the Bengal Sultanate. Alauddin appointed Paragal Khan as the head of the military and administration in Chittagong. Khan was based in Paragalpur. Khan with his son, Chhuti Khan, developed a military garrison in Paragalpur. The site was chosen to defend the Bengal Sultanate's borders from Twipra Kingdom in the East and pirates from the Kingdom of Mrauk U in the South. It was named Laskarpur (after laskar soldiers) before being renamed Paragalpur after Paragal Khan.

The court of Paragal Khan was based in Paragalpur. The court poet, Kabindra Parameswar Das, wrote the first Bengali translation of the Mahabharata (from Sanskrit). Another court poet, Srikar Nandi, Mahabharata's Ashwamedh chapter. The court was cultural center of the region attracting poets and intellectuals. Syed Sultan, noted medieval poet, was from Paragalpur.
