= Chandgoan residential area =

Residential area in Chattogram, Bangladesh

Chandgoan Residential Area
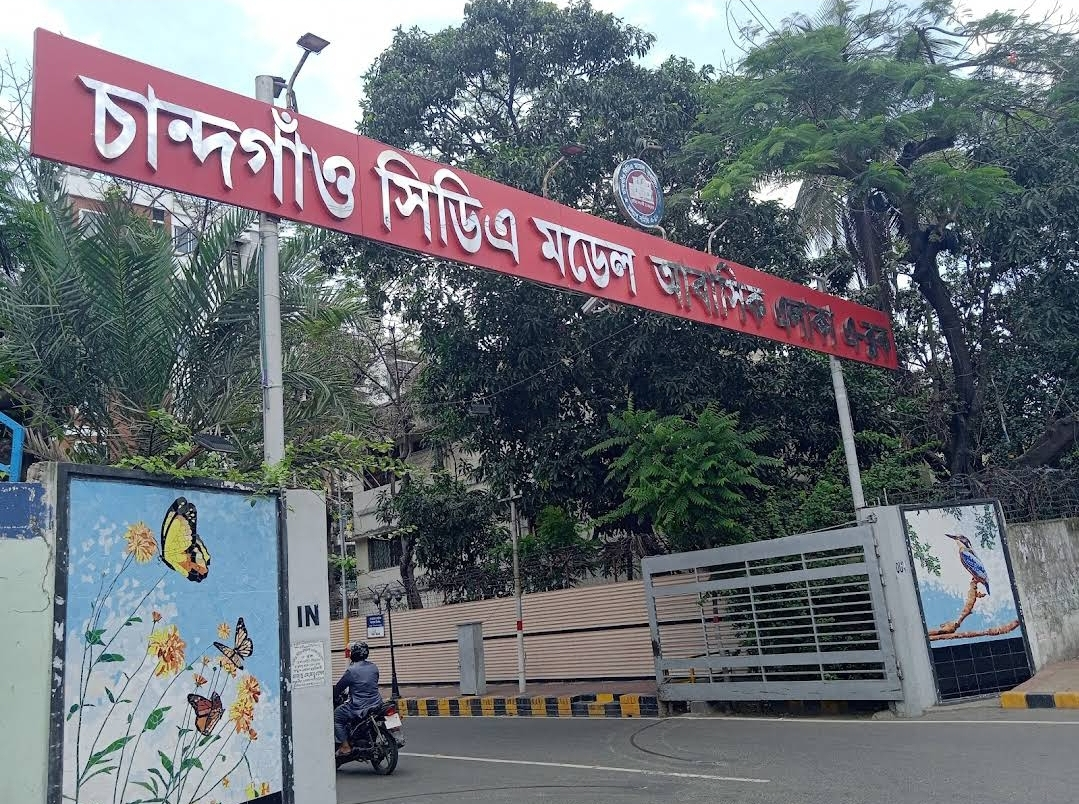
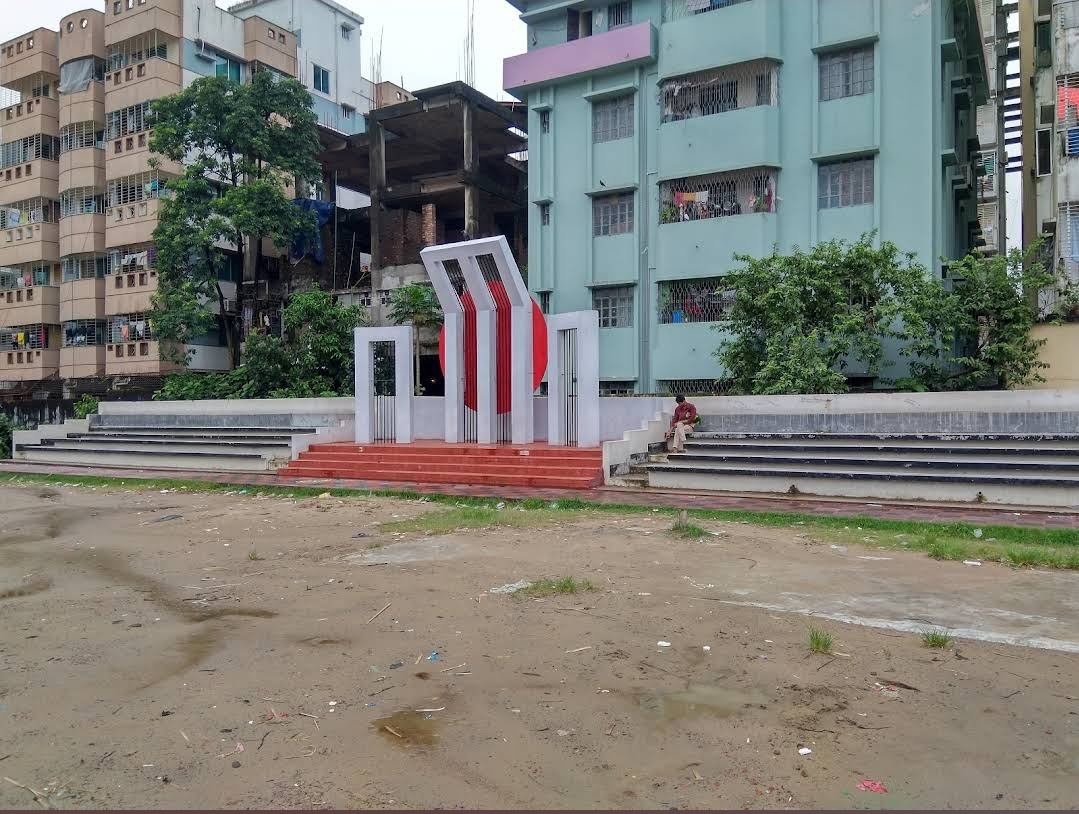
- Entrance at the A-Block of the residential area Central Shaheed Minar at the CDA Public School

Project
- Developer: Chittagong Development Authority
- Website: cda.gov.bd

Location
- Coordinates: 22°23′N 91°52′E
- Country: Bangladesh
- Division: Chattogram
- Thana: Chandgaon Thana

Chandgoan Residential Area (Bengali: চান্দগাঁও আবাসিক এলাকা) is a residential area in Chittagong, Bangladesh, developed by the Chittagong Development Authority (CDA), and is therefore often referred to as the CDA Residential Area. It is situated within Chandgaon Thana, in proximity to Bahaddarhat.

The area also encompasses the Kalurghat Betar Kendra, the site where the declaration of the Independence of Bangladesh was first made.

The area was developed by the CDA in 1978. Chandgaon R/A has 663 multi-storey residential buildings on 741 plots consisting of three blocks:

- A-Block,
- B-Block,
- Y-Block.

== Economy ==
The peaceful residential character of the area is gradually being spoiled as a section of owners encourage mushroom growth of commercial establishments in violation of law for higher rent, the residents said.

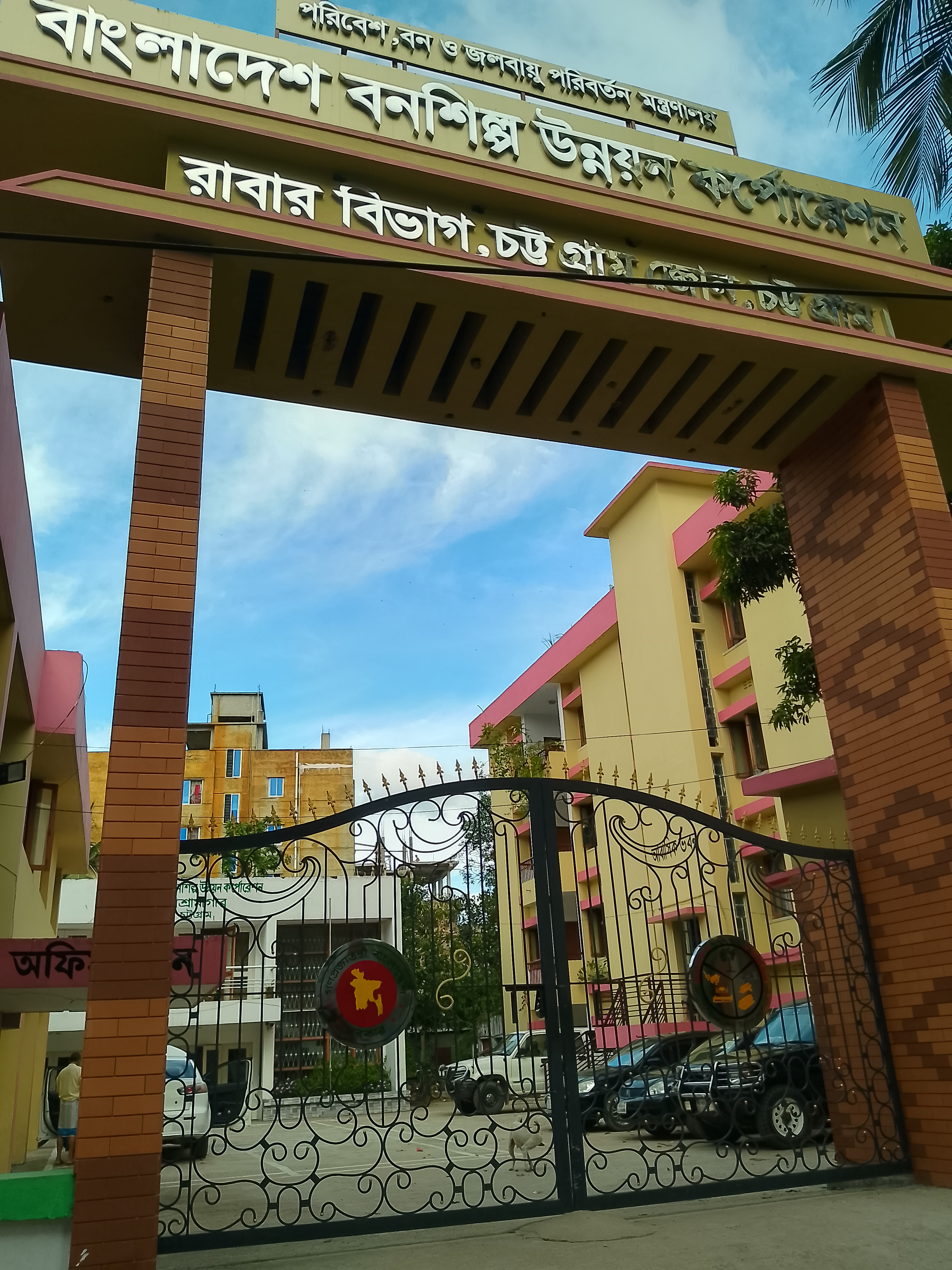
BFIDC Chandgaon Branch in B-Block of the residential area

Numerous enterprises, including schools and colleges, healthcare centres, government and non-government organisations' offices, boutiques, tailoring shops, beauty parlours and rehabilitation centres for drug addicts, have been set up in the residential flats and buildings of the area during the last one decade.

== Educational institutions ==
- CDA Public School and College

Chittagong Education Board is also located within this area.

== Establishments ==
The government establishments include Karmajibi Mahila Hostel and Rabindra Sanad Cultural Academy.

Non-government organizations are Integrated Development Foundation (IDF), Young Power in Social Action (YPSA) and Organization for Women Development in Bangladesh (OWDEB).

Addicts' medication and rehabilitation centres, including Tori, Protisruti and Prashanti have also been set up in the residential area having grocery store and other shops at almost each and every corner includes Shwapno which is a Bangladeshi supermarket chain.

== Issues ==
In Chandgaon, residents have noted ongoing noise disturbances stemming from various sources, including commercial enterprises, rehabilitation centers, and office activities. These disturbances, which involve loud music and vehicular traffic, occur both during the day and at night, altering the residential atmosphere to resemble that of a busy commercial district.

Concerns have been raised regarding property owners who lease their premises for commercial use, with some residents suggesting that this practice may contravene regulations and disrupt the area's residential character. Moreover, there are observations about the potential impact of inadequate tax payments by these commercial entities on government revenue.

Fazlul Karim of the Chittagong Development Authority (CDA) has acknowledged the presence of unauthorized commercial activities in Chandgaon and has initiated measures to address these concerns. Recent efforts have included the identification and enforcement actions against businesses operating without proper authorization within the residential area.

The CDA has also directed its estate department to take appropriate steps regarding property owners who may be facilitating unauthorized commercial activities, signaling a commitment to maintaining the residential integrity of Chandgaon while ensuring compliance with regulatory standards.
