= Kavindra Parameshwar =

Kavindra Parameshwar (Bengali: কবিন্দ্র পরমেশ্বর) or Parameshwar Das, was a medieval Bengali poet. He wrote the first Bengali translation of the Sanskrit epic Mahabharata.

== Biography ==
Kavindra Parameshwar was born as Parameshwar Das in Balanda, Saptagram, Hooghly. He was given the title Kavindra, which means prime among the poets, for his literary contributions. Gunaraj, his father, was a zamindar and an influential local leader.

Parameshwar was the court poet of Bengal Sultanate governor Paragal Khan. At the request of Paragal Khan, he wrote an abridged version of the Mahabharata in Bengali. It is believed to be the first Bengali version of the Mahabharata (translate from Sanskrit). He wrote it during 1519-1519. His version of the Mahabharata is called "Kavindra-Mahabharata".
