= Hazera Taju Degree College =

Non-government honors level degree college in Chandgaon Thana, Chittagong, Bangladesh

- হাজেরা-তজু ডিগ্রি কলেজ
- Type: University college
- Established: 1991; 35 years ago
- Affiliations: National University, Bangladesh Board of Intermediate and Secondary Education, Chattogram Bangladesh Open University
- Academic staff: 51 (2014)
- Students: 5,000 (Total)
- Location: Chandgaon Thana, Chittagong, Bangladesh; 22.3781°N 91.8540°E
- Campus: Urban
- Language: Bengali
- Colors: White & black
- Website: htdc.edu.bd

Hazera-Taju University College is a non-government non political honors level degree college situated at Chandgaon Thana, Chittagong, Bangladesh. The institution was founded by former member of parliament for Chittagong-8 Nurul Islam (BSc) in 1991 as a women's college. From the very beginning of its establishment to 2005 the institution would only offer Degree pass certificate course in science, arts and commerce. Since 2006, the institution has offered graduation in management and since 2007 in accounting. The institution has about four campus but the area of this college is not too big. The institution is trying its best to offer graduation in many other subjects in the near future. It is quite good and well known college in Chittagong.The nature of the college student and teacher is very friendly.However, at present, the institution has become a full-fledged university college.

== History ==
It was established in 1991 as a women's college.

== Students ==
There are 5000 students study in this college.

== Management ==
It has a governing body who conduct this college.

== Faculties and departments ==
The institution has following faculty and departments:

=== Department ===
- Science
- Commerce
- Arts

=== Faculty of Business Studies ===
- Department of Management
- Department of Accounting

=== Faculty of Social Science ===
- Department of Economics

== Academic recognition ==
Course	Date of first affiliation
SSC	1–07–1991
Degree (Pass)	1–07–1994
Honours	1–07–2007

== Association ==
- Hazera Taju University College Alumni Association (Association of ex-Students)

== See also ==
- University of Chittagong
