= Chattogram Development Authority =

Planning Agency Of Chattogram

- চট্টগ্রাম উন্নয়ন কর্তৃপক্ষ
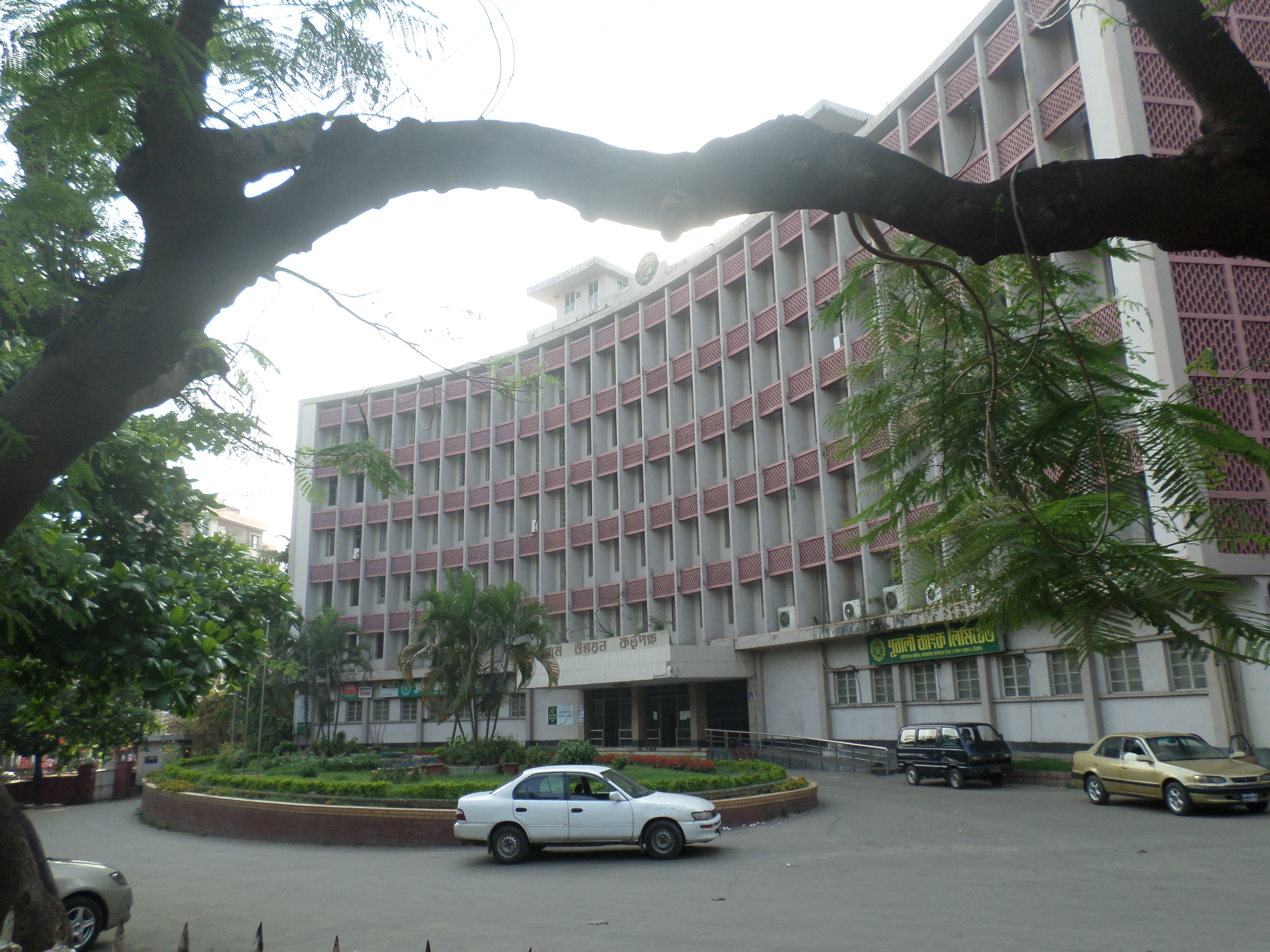
- Chattogram Development Authority building

Agency overview
- Formed: 1959; 67 years ago
- Superseding agency: Development of Chattogram
- Jurisdiction: Chattogram
- Headquarters: CDA building, Court Road, Kotowali, Chattogram
- Agency executives: Belayet Hossain, Chairman; Mohammad Mahbubul Karim, Secretary
- Parent agency: Ministry of Housing and Public Works
- Key documents: The Chittagong Development Authority Ordinance, 1959 (East Pakistan Ordinance);(Ordinance NO. LI OF 1959); Chittagong Development Authority Act, 2018 (Act No. 31 of 2018)
- Website: cda.gov.bd

Chattogram Development Authority (Bengali: চট্টগ্রাম উন্নয়ন কর্তৃপক্ষ, romanized: Choṭṭogrām Unnôẏôn Kôrtipôkkhô; abbreviated as CDA) is a Bangladesh government urban planning authority responsible for the planned development, regulation, and management of Chattogram, Bangladesh. Established in 1959 by the Government of Bangladesh, the authority oversees the preparation and implementation of master plans, controls urban development activities, and facilitates the expansion and improvement of the Chattogram metropolitan area. It operates under the Ministry of Housing and Public Works.

== Area covered ==
According to the structure plan of the organization from 1995, the area covered a total of 1,152 km^{2}. Chandgoan residential area is also developed by CDA. The organisation also constructed two educational institutions in the area:

- CDA Public School and College
- CDA Girls' School and College

== Boundaries ==
- In North: Bansbaria of Sitakunda,
- In South: Sangu River, Anwara
- In East: Ichakhali of Rangunia
- In West: The Bay of Bengal
