= Paragal Khan =

Officer of the Bengal Sultanate (c. 15th–16th century)

Lashkar Paragal Khan
- পরাগল খাঁ
- Born: Chittagong District, Bengal Sultanate
- Occupation: Military commander
- Children: Chhuti Khan
- Father: Rasti Khan

Paragal Khan (Bengali: পরাগল খাঁ, Bengali pronunciation: [pɔraɡol kʰã]) was an administrator and military commander (lashkar) of the Bengal Sultanate in the late 15th century and early 16th century. He served as the General of Alauddin Husain Shah.

== Early life ==
Khan was born into a Bengali Muslim family of nobles that served as military commanders under the Sultan of Bengal and were living in the Chittagong region for generations. His father, Rasti Khan, was Chittagong's military commander under Rukunuddin Barbak Shah. His family had lived in the region for generations. His great-great-grandfather, Mahisawar, came to Bengal and had married a local Brahmin girl, and their descendants became important officials in the court of Bengal Sultanate.

== Career ==
After Alauddin Husain Shah conquered Chittagong, he made Khan a commander with the title of laskar. He received large land grants from Shah, ruler of the Bengal Sultanate.

Khan lived in Zorwarganj in Chittagong District. After the Bengal Sultanate–Kingdom of Mrauk U War of 1512–1516, he was appointed the governor of Chittagong region. He patronized the poets Kavindra Parameshwar, his court poet. He patronized the writing of Kavindra Mahabharata, the first Bengali version of the Mahabharata. It is believed the village of Paragalpur is named after him and is home to his descendants. The residents of village use water from Paragal Dighi, a reservoir named after him. His son was Nusrat Khan, also known as Chuti Khan, who patronised poets like his father.
