= Chhuti Khan =

Military commander

Lashkar Chhuti Khan
- ছুটি খাঁ
- Born: Chittagong District, Bengal Sultanate
- Occupation: Military commander
- Father: Paragal Khan
- Relatives: Mahisawar (ancestor),Rasti Khan (grandfather), Hamzah Khan (son), Muhammad Khan (great-great-grandson)

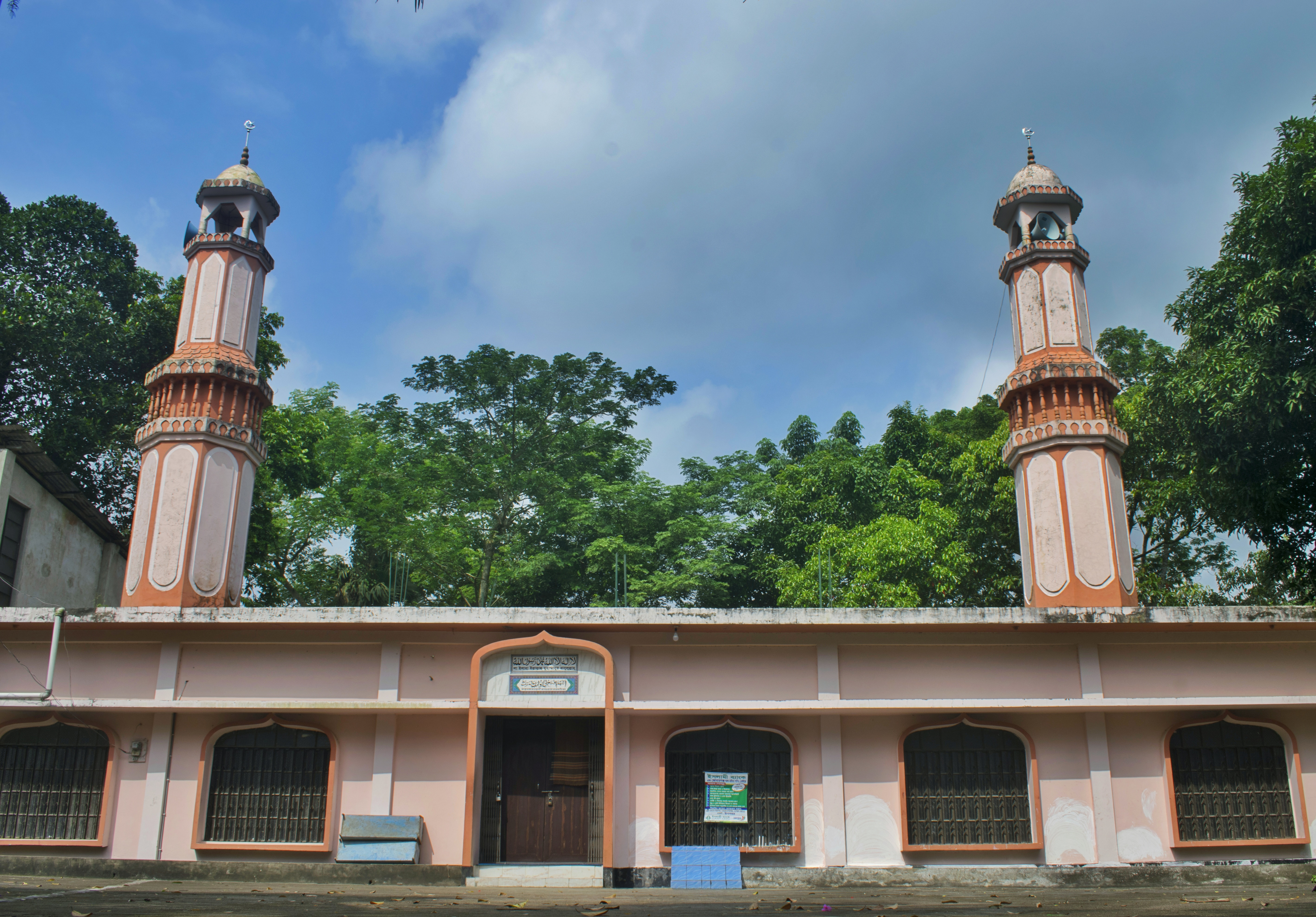
Chhuti Khan Mosque in Jorarganj, Mirsarai.

Nusrat Khan (Persian: نصرت خان, Bengali: নুসরত খাঁন), better known as Chhuti Khan (Bengali: ছুটি খাঁ, Bengali pronunciation: [tʃʰuʈi kʰã]), was a military commander of the Bengal Sultanate and Governor of Chittagong in the early 16th century.

== Early life ==
Khan was born into a Muslim family of nobles that served as military commanders under the Sultan of Bengal and were living in the Chittagong region for generations. His father, Paragal Khan, and grandfather, Rasti Khan, were the previous military commanders of the Bengal Sultanate and governors of the Northern Chittagong region.

== Career ==
Khan held an inherited position. He was tasked with guarding the borders of the Sultanate. He successfully defended the sultanate from the Twipra Kingdom, which, led by Dhanya Manikya, invaded the sultanate in 1513 and 1515. In the process he occupied large parts of the Twipra Kingdom. He had good relations with Nasiruddin Nasrat Shah, the Sultan of Bengal.

Khan was a supporter of literature. He ordered his court poet, Shrikar Nandi, to translate the Ashvamedha chapter of the Mahabharat from Sanskrit to Bengali. The poem was written in a couplet and tripathi matra format and was called the Chhutikhani Mahabharata. He build a canal in Chittagong the still exists today. He built the Chhuti Khan's Mosque which, heavily rebuilt, still stands. Chhutikhani Mahabharata is one earlier Bengali versions of the Mahabharata.
