= Portuguese settlement in Chittagong =

Portuguese trading port in Bangladesh (1528–1666)

Grand Harbor of Bengal Porto Grande de Bengala (Portuguese)
- 1528–1666
- Top: Flag of Portugal (1521–1578); Bottom: Flag of Portugal (1640–1667) Coat of arms

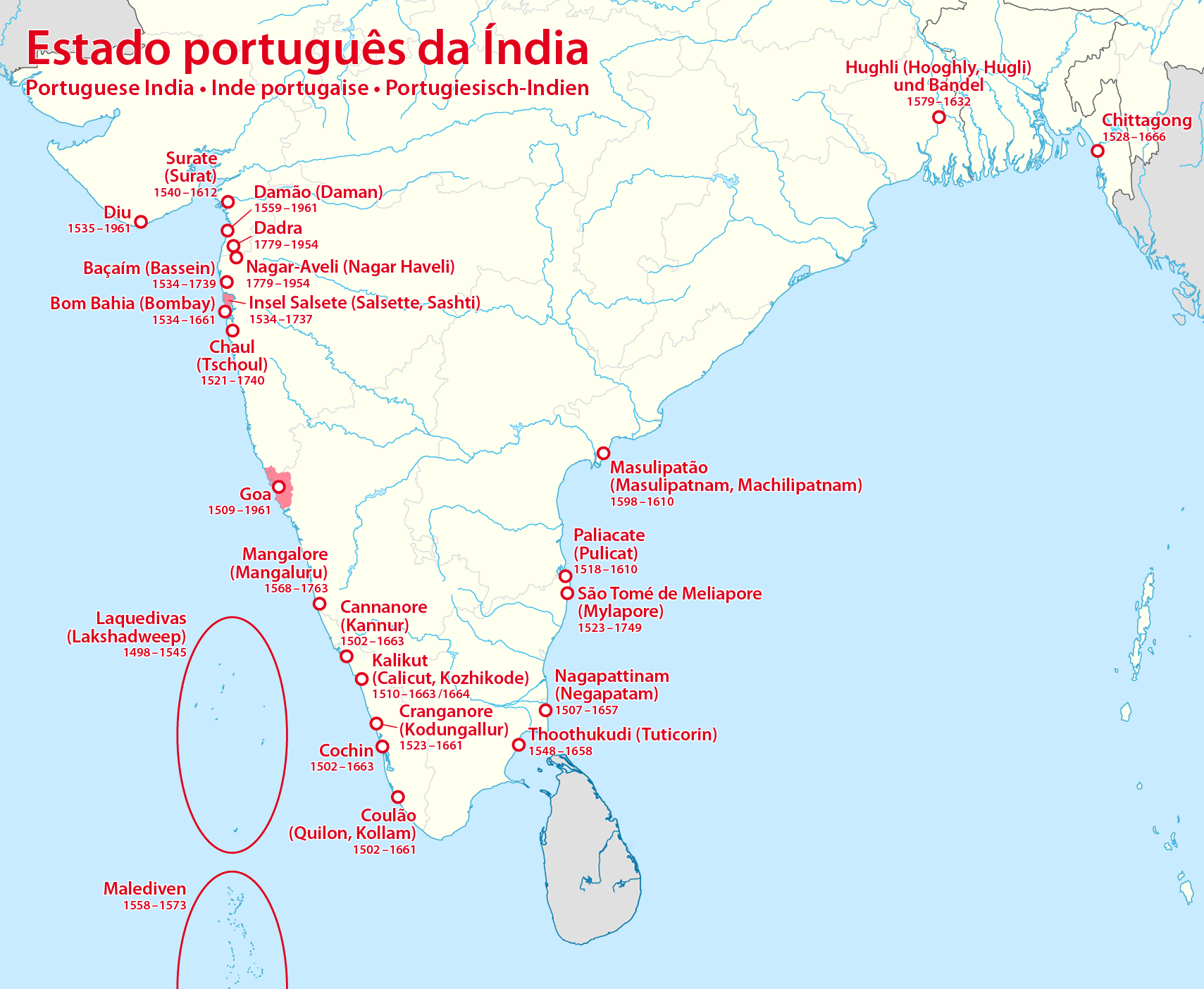
- Portuguese Chittagong (at top right corner) with other Portuguese settlements in India
- Status: Trading post
- Capital: Firingi Bunder
- Common languages: Portuguese, Bengali
- King of Portugal
  - 1528–1557: John III (first)
  - 1656–1666: Afonso VI (last)
- Historical era: Imperialism
  - Permission from the Bengal Sultanate: 1528
  - Mughal annexation: 1666
Preceded by	Succeeded by
Bengal Sultanate; Kingdom of Mrauk U	Mughal Empire

Chittagong, the second largest city and main port of Bangladesh, was home to a thriving trading post of the Portuguese Empire in the East in the 16th and 17th centuries. The Portuguese first arrived in Chittagong around 1528, and left in 1666 after the Mughal conquest. It was the first European colonial enclave in the historic region of Bengal.

== Etymology ==
Chittagong was the largest seaport in the Sultanate of Bengal, which was termed as the "Shahi Bangalah" (Imperial Bengal) in Persian and Bengali. The Portuguese referred to the port city as Porto Grande de Bengala, which meant "the Grand Harbor of Bengal". The term was often simplified as Porto Grande.

== History ==
=== Arrival of the Portuguese ===
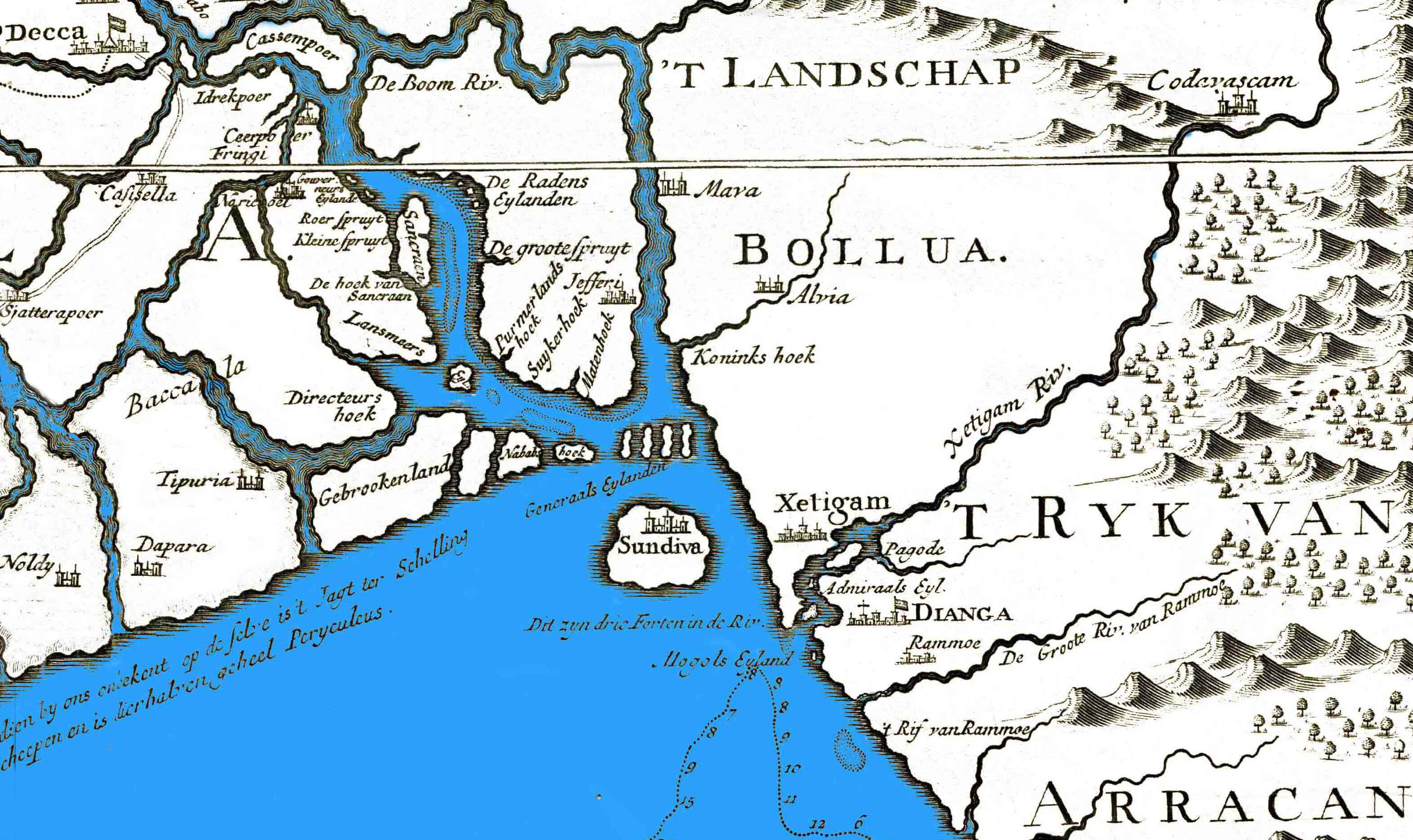
Early Dutch map of Bengal

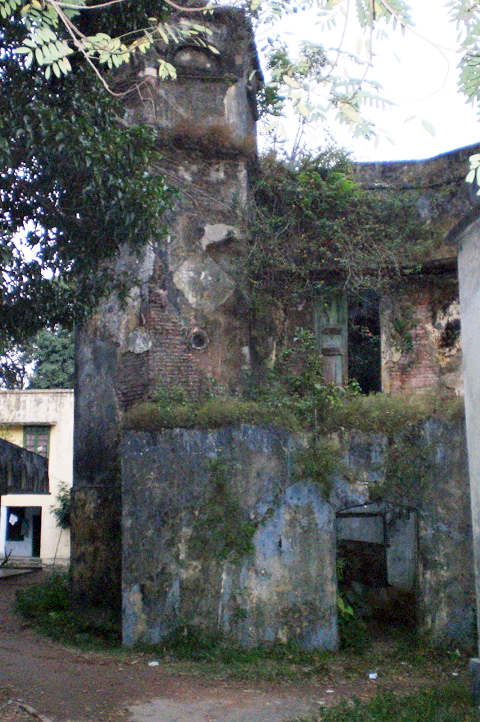
The first court building of Chittagong known as Darul Adalat located in Government Hazi Mohammad Mohshin College is a testimony of the Portuguese settlement.

On 9 May 1518, a fleet of four ships commanded by João da Silveira from the Estado da India arrived in Chittagong from Goa. They were followed by several embassies from the Kingdom of Portugal to the Sultanate of Bengal, then reputed as the wealthiest region in the Indian subcontinent. He set up the first Portuguese factory in Bengal at Chittagong in 1517. Traders from Portuguese Malacca, Bombay and Ceylon also frequented the region.

Some sources indicate that Joao Coelho had arrived in Chittagong before João da Silveira. Many Malaccan Portuguese had come to the Bengal before Silveira in Moorish ships as traders. Moreover, some of the Portuguese settled in Pipli (present day Orissa) in 1514 and had visited Western Bengal.

=== Established trading base ===
In 1528, the Sultan of Bengal permitted the Portuguese to establish factories and customs houses in the Port of Chittagong. A fort and naval base was established in Firingi Bandar. The settlement grew into the most prominent Eurasian port on the Bay of Bengal during the Age of Discovery. The cartaz system was introduced and required all ships in the area to purchase naval trading licenses from the Portuguese. In 1590, the Portuguese conquered the nearby islands of Sandwip under the leadership of António de Sousa Godinho. In 1602, the Sandwip island of Chittagong was conquered by the Portuguese from Kedar Rai of Sripur.

Portuguese pirates, named Gonçalves and Carvalho, ruled the island of Sandwip for several years. Each year about 300 salt loaded ships sailed for Liverpool from Sandwip. Sandwip was very famous for its ship-building and salt industries at that time. In 1616, after the arrival of Delwar Khan, a high-ranking Mughal naval officer, the Portuguese pirates were driven away from Sandwip and Delwar Khan ruled the island independently for about 50 years.

The harbour of Chittagong became the most important port to the Portuguese because of its location, navigational facilities and safe anchorage. The port is very close to the mouth of the Meghna which was the principal route to the Royal capital of Gouda.

Evidently the Portuguese found Chittagong a congenial place to live. By the end of the sixteenth century, the Chittagong port had emerged as a thriving port, which attracted both unofficial Portuguese trade and settlement. According to a 1567 note of Caesar Federeci, every year thirty or thirty five ships, great and small, anchored in Chittagong port. In 1598 there lived about 2,500 Portuguese and Eurasians in Chittagong and Arakan.

The increased commercial presence included bureaucrats, merchants, missionaries, soldiers, adventurers, sailors and pirates. The enclave had a highly laissez-faire administration led by traders. Slave trade and piracy flourished. Major traded products included fine silk, cotton muslin textiles, bullion, spices, rice, timber, salt and gunpowder.

The Roman Catholic Church was established in Bengal during Portuguese rule in Chittagong. The port city was the seat of the first Vicar Apostolic of Bengal. The Portuguese also encouraged intermarriage with the local population.

In 1615, the Portuguese Navy defeated an Arakanese-Dutch VOC fleet near the port city.

=== Piracy ===
The Portuguese presence in Chittagong was ultimately ephemeral. The fall of the Bengal Sultanate and the rise of the Arakanese Kingdom of Mrauk U changed the geopolitical landscape. Chittagong became a major bone of contention between the Mughal Empire, the Kingdom of Mrauk U, the Burmese Empire and the Kingdom of Tripura. The King of Mrauk U massacred 600 members of the Portuguese community in Dianga in 1607. Subsequently, the Portuguese allied with Arakan. Portuguese-Arakanese piracy increased against Mughal Bengal in the 17th century. In response, the Portuguese ravaged the Arakan coast and carried off the booty to the king of Barisal.

=== Slavery ===
The Portuguese took over the eastern portion of the Arab slave trade networks and sold their slaves in Tamluk and Balasore, and in Deccan ports. Slaves were sold at Dianga and Pipli, and transported by ship. The Portuguese built a fort at Pipli in 1599 for prisoners brought by the Arakanese. In 1629 the Portuguese under the command of Diego Da Sa raided Dhaka and took many prisoners including a Syed woman, the wife of a Mughal military officer and carried her off in chains to Dianga. The prisoners were converted to Christianity.

=== End of settlement ===
In 1632, the Mughal army expelled the Portuguese from the Satgaon (Hooghly), owing to Portuguese association with the slave trade, kidnapping and refusal to support Shah Jahan. In 1666, the Mughal viceroy Shaista Khan retook control of Chittagong after defeating the Arakanese in a naval war. The Mughal conquest of Chittagong brought an end to the Portuguese dominance of more than 130 years in the port city. The conquest of the port of Chittagong was similarly aimed mainly at driving Arakanese slave raiders out of Bengal.

The Mughals attacked the Arakanese from the jungle with a 6500-man army supported by 288 ships of war bound for the seizure of Chittagong harbour. After three days of battle, the Arakanese surrendered. Chittagong promptly became the capital of the new Government.

This battle involved movement across both land and water. To combat the pirates' skill over water, the Mughals called for the support of Dutch ships from Batavia. Before the Dutch ships reached the coast of Chittagong, the battle had already ended. To carry soldiers, Shaista Khan constructed several large ships and a large number of galleys. After the Mughals took Chittagong, the Portuguese moved to the Ferengi Bazaar in Dhaka. Descendants of the Portuguese still reside in these places.

=== Other settlements ===
From Chittagong, the Portuguese proceeded to establish settlements in other Bengali ports and cities, notably Satgaon, Bandel and Dhaka. Satgaon became known as Porto Pequeno (Little Haven). Portogola in Old Dhaka hosted the city's Portuguese community.

== Spreading of Christianity ==
Christianity spread across Bengal by the Portuguese traders along with the Christian missionaries. Although Christianity had already reached Ancient India with Thomas the Apostle in 52 CE, the Portuguese set up the first Christian churches in Chittagong. In 1498, Christian explorer Vasco de Gama travelled Bengal.

== Legacy ==
The descendants of the Portuguese traders in Chittagong are known as Firingis. They live in the areas of Patharghata and Firingi Bazar in Old Chittagong. There are numerous Portuguese loanwords in the Bengali language, including many common household terms, particularly in Chittagonian language. The Portuguese brought many exotic fruits, flowers and plants, especially from their Latin American Brazilian colony. They introduced chillies, delonix regia, guavas, pineapples, papayas and Alfonso mangoes to Bengal.

A Portuguese missionary in British Kolkata published the first book on Bengali grammar. The oldest churches in Bangladesh and West Bengal trace their origins to Portuguese missionary missions which arrived in Chittagong in the 16th century. Most Bangladeshi Christians have Portuguese surnames.

After the independence of Bangladesh, Portugal recognised it on 20 December 1974 following the Carnation Revolution, when it established relations with many decolonised nations. The Portuguese have had a great influence on trade, culture, character and language of the people of Chittagong.

== Portuguese attractions ==
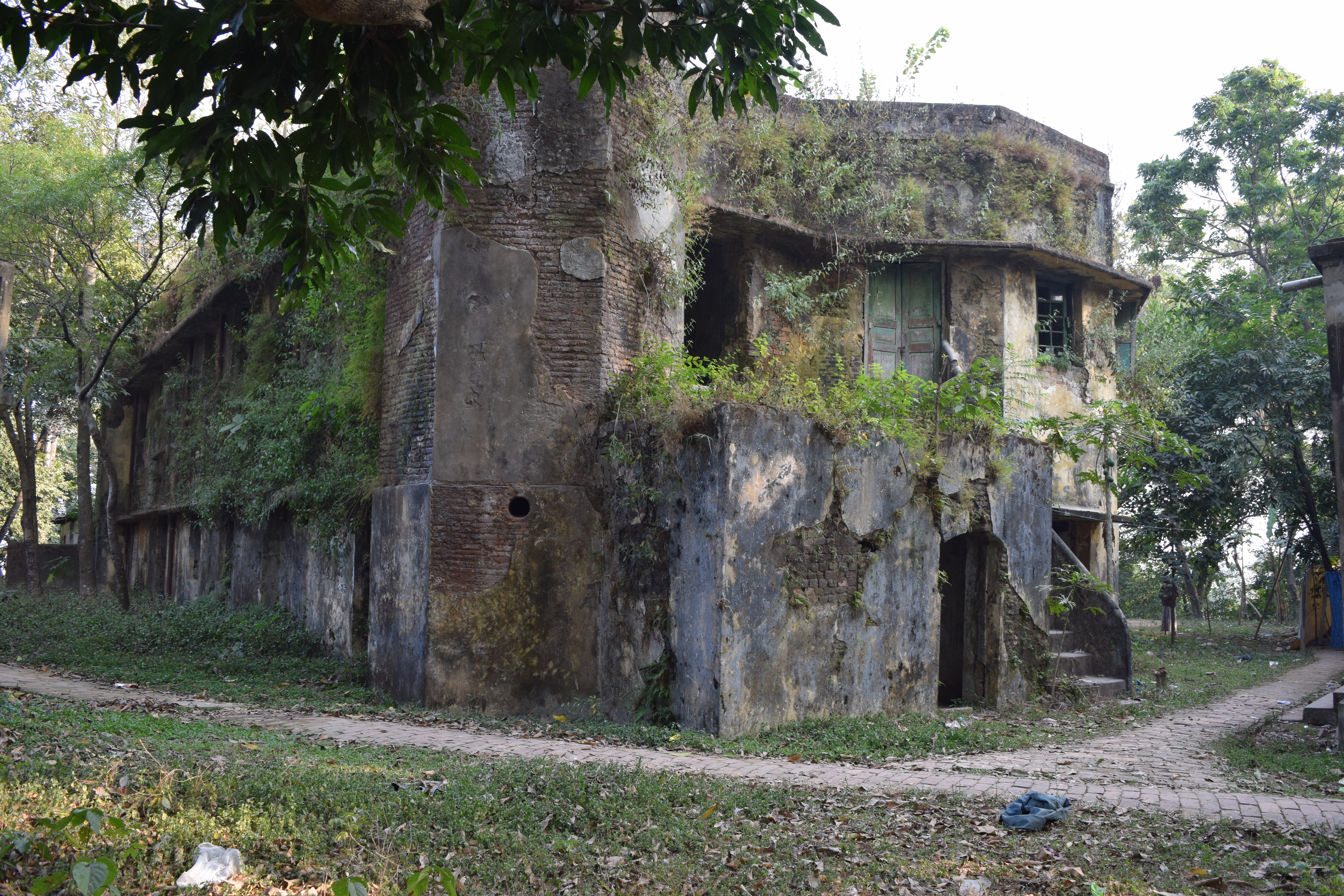
Darul Adalat, better known as the Portuguese Building, is one of the few remains of the Portuguese settlement in Chittagong

Very few physical vestiges of the Portuguese presence are found at present in Chittagong and Bengal, generally. Darul Adalat, the first court building of Chittagong is located in the Government Hazi Mohammad Mohshin College campus, is a structure built by the Portuguese. The structure is locally known as Portuguese Fort. Initiative has been taken by the Department of Archaeology of Bangladesh to preserve the vestige.

There are few churches and ruins. Some geographical place names remain, like Dom Manik Islands, Point Palmyras on the Orissa coast, Firingi Bazar in Dhaka and Chittagong.

== See also ==
- Dutch settlement in Rajshahi
- Armenian community of Dhaka
- History of Bombay under Portuguese rule (1534-1661)
