= Syed Sultan =

Medieval Bengali Muslim poet

- সৈয়দ সুলতান
- Born: 1550; Habiganj, Bengal Sultanate
- Died: 1648 (aged 97–98)
- Occupations: Poet, writer

Syed Sultan (c. 1550 – 1648) was a medieval Bengali Muslim poet and writer. He is best known for his magnum opus Nabibangsha (1584 AD), one of the earliest Bengali translations of the Qisas Al-Anbiya. His works are included in the curriculum for school and higher secondary Bengali literature in Bangladesh.

== Early life ==
Syed Sultan was born in Habiganj, in the Bengal Sultanate (now Bangladesh). He hailed from the Taraf region of Greater Sylhet and was a descendant of Syed Habibullah of the Taraf Kingdom. He lived in the Sultanshi household in Habigonj.

== Career and contributions ==
Sultan was a prolific poet who primarily focused on Islamic religious themes. His Nabibangsha recounts the lives of prophets in Bengali verse, and he helped establish a Bengali Muslim literary tradition during the medieval period. He showed his patriotism and love for his mother tongue Bengali language in Nabibangsha (1584 AD). He criticised the local Bengali Maulavis for their disdainful thinking towards their own mother tongue.

কর্মদোষে বঙ্গেত বাঙ্গালী উৎপন
না বুঝে বাঙ্গালী সবে আরবী বচন।
ফলে আপনা দ্বীনের বোল এক না বুঝিলা
প্রস্তাব পাইয়া সব ভুলিয়া রহিলা।
কিন্তু যারে যেই ভাষে প্রভু করিল সৃজন
সেই ভাষা হয় তার অমূল্য রতন।

— Syed Sultan

By the workings of fate, Bengalis were born in Bengal,
Yet the Bengalis do not understand the Arabic language.
As a result, you have not understood that the language of all our religion followers is not the same.
Having heard others’ proposals, they remained lost in confusion.
But in whatever language the Lord created a person,
That language is his priceless jewel.

== Bibliography ==
- Nabibangsha (Family of the Prophet), a big epic about more than 20 prophets from Adam to Musa and Isa.)
- Rasulcharita
  - Shab-e-Meraj (The Night of Ascension)
  - Ofate Rasul (Death of the Messenger)
- Jaikum Rajar Lorai (King Jaikum's Battle)
- Iblis Nama (Book of Iblis)
- Gyan Pradeep (Lamp of Knowledge)
- Gyan Chautisha(Chautisha of Knowledge; abridged version of the above)
- Marfati Gan
- Padabali

Sultan's complete work including Rasulcharita was published in a book form by the Bangla Academy in 1978.
