= Ministry of Industries (Bangladesh) =

Government ministry of Bangladesh

- শিল্প মন্ত্রণালয়
- Government Seal of Bangladesh

Ministry overview
- Formed: 16 December 1971; 54 years ago
- Jurisdiction: Government of Bangladesh
- Headquarters: Ministry of Industries, Dhaka, Bangladesh
- Annual budget: ৳1692 crore (US$140 million) (2026-2027)
- Minister responsible: Khandakar Abdul Muktadir, Minister of Industries
- Ministry executive: Md. Obaidur Rahman, Secretary
- Child agencies: Bangladesh Standards and Testing Institution; Bangladesh Industrial and Technical Assistance Center; Bangladesh Institute of Management; Department of Patents, Designs and Trademarks; National Productivity Organization; Office of The Chief Inspector of Boilers
- Website: www.moind.gov.bd

The Ministry of Industries (Bengali: শিল্প মন্ত্রণালয়, romanized: Śilpa Montronaloy) is a ministry of the Government of Bangladesh responsible for formulating and implementing industrial policy, promoting industrial growth, and ensuring the sustainable development of the industrial sector across the country. The ministry oversees state-owned industrial enterprises and supports the development of manufacturing, small and medium industries, and industrial infrastructure.

== Corporations ==
- Bangladesh Chemical Industries Corporation (BCIC)
- Bangladesh Sugar and Food Industries Corporation (BFSIC)
- Bangladesh Steel and Engineering Corporation (BSEC)
- Bangladesh Small and Cottage Industries Corporation (BSCIC)

== Departments ==
- Bangladesh Standards and Testing Institution (BSTI)
- Bangladesh Industrial and Technical Assistance Center (BITAC)
- Bangladesh Institute of Management (BIM)
- Department of Patents, Designs and Trademarks (DPDT)
- National Productivity Organization (NPO)
- Office of The Chief Inspector of Boilers

== Board ==
- Bangladesh Accreditation Board (BAB)

== Foundation ==
- Small and Medium Enterprise Foundation (SMEF)
- Small, Micro and Cottage Industry Foundation (SMCIF)

== See also ==
- Minister of Industries (Bangladesh)
