= Bangladesh Standards and Testing Institution =

Government regulatory body controlling standards, weights and measurements

BSTI
- Bangladesh Standards and Testing Institution
- বাংলাদেশ স্ট্যান্ডার্ডস এন্ড টেস্টিং ইনস্টিটিউশন
- BSTI Certification Mark
- Established: July 25, 1985; 41 years ago
- Merger of: Bangladesh Standards Institution (1985); Central Testing Laboratories (1985); Department of Agricultural Grading and Marking (1995)
- Type: Autonomous government body
- Purpose: Controlling of standards, weights and measurements
- Headquarters: 116/A, Tejgaon Industrial Area, Dhaka, Bangladesh
- Services: Certification mark licence, Import clearance, Laboratory services, Metrology services, Management system certification, Halal certification
- Minister responsible: Khandakar Abdul Muktadir
- Key people: Director General (Grade-1)
- Parent organization: Ministry of Industries
- Staff: 600+
- Website: bsti.gov.bd

Bangladesh Standards and Testing Institution (BSTI) is an autonomous government body under the Ministry of Industries, established to control the standards of services, goods, weights and measures, and promote the adoption of the international system of units in Bangladesh. This institution is a Key Performance Indicator (KPI) of the Government of Bangladesh.

== History ==
The origins of the Bangladesh Standards and Testing Institution (BSTI) can be traced back to the mid-20th century during the period of East Pakistan. In 1955, a regional branch of the Central Testing Laboratories (CTL) was established in Dhaka to assess the quality of imported and domestically produced goods. This was followed by the establishment of a regional office of the Pakistan Standards Institution in Dhaka in 1957, and the creation of the Certification Marks Inspectorate in Chittagong in 1963 to regulate industrial product certification.

Following Bangladesh's independence in 1971, the Bangladesh Standards Institution (BDSI) was formed as the country's national standards body. It became a member of the International Organization for Standardization (ISO) in 1974. In an effort to consolidate standards development, testing, and certification functions, the government enacted Ordinance No. XXXVII of 1985, merging BDSI and CTL to form the present-day Bangladesh Standards and Testing Institution (BSTI).

The institution's scope was further expanded in 1995 with the merger of the Department of Agricultural Grading and Marking. Earlier, in 1982, the Standards of Weights and Measures Ordinance was promulgated to implement the metric system across the country, a function now overseen by BSTI.

BSTI operates under the Ministry of Industries and serves as the national authority for standardization, conformity assessment, and metrology. Over the years, it has undergone significant modernization. A National Metrology Laboratory was established with financial and technical assistance from the European Union, NORAD, UNIDO, and the Government of Bangladesh.

BSTI's laboratories—covering physical, chemical, and microbiological testing—have received accreditation from the National Accreditation Board for Testing and Calibration Laboratories (NABL) of India. Its product certification scheme is accredited by the National Accreditation Board for Certification Bodies (NABCB) of India. The Management System Certification (MSC) program has also been accredited by both Norwegian Accreditation and the Bangladesh Accreditation Board (BAB).

In recent years, BSTI expanded its infrastructure with the inauguration of a modern testing facility in Khulna on 21 November 2023, followed by the opening of a ten-story center in Chittagong's Agrabad Commercial Area on 28 June 2025. The Chittagong facility, equipped with advanced laboratories, aims to bolster the region's role as a major port and industrial hub by strengthening BSTI's capabilities in product testing, certification, and trade facilitation.

=== Standardization of Bangla on computers ===
The responsibility of promulgating these standards lies with the Bangladesh Standards and Testing Institution (BSTI), while the task of technical drafting and declaration is carried out by the BCC. The organization has already developed several standards and simultaneously modernized the existing ones.

Due to lack of coherence and synergy between vendors and technologists, these standards were largely never widely accepted nor recognized by international bodies. Later, versions of standards such as BSCII in essence rubber stamped Unicode encoding scheme.

An official order to mandatorily install a keyboard layout package kit in 2018 spawned furor over multiple fronts.

== About ==
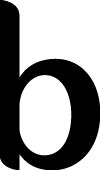
Package registration mark from BSTI

BSTI is the national standards body of Bangladesh, responsible for formulating and issuing Bangladesh Standards (BDS) for products, services, and processes. Since its establishment, BSTI has developed over 4,000 standards to ensure quality, safety, and compliance. It certifies products that meet national standards by issuing a Certification Mark (CM) licence, valid for three years, following thorough factory inspections and laboratory testing. Use of the BSTI certification mark is restricted to licensed manufacturers. Currently, 315 products require mandatory CM licences for domestic production, distribution, and sale, while 79 imported items need BSTI clearance under the country's import policy. BSTI's Metrology Division regulates packaged commodities under the Package Commodity Registration Rules 2021 and calibrates weighing and measuring devices to ensure adherence to the International System of Units. The institution also provides laboratory testing and calibration services to industries, markets, government offices, and individuals. Its monitoring activities include market surveillance, mobile courts, and random sampling from markets and factories to combat substandard or counterfeit goods. Additionally, BSTI represents Bangladesh in international and regional standards organizations and promotes public awareness of quality standards and consumer rights.

=== Governing body ===
BSTI is an autonomous agency of the Government of Bangladesh. It operates its activities under the Bangladesh Standards & Testing Institution Act - 2018. A counsel of 37 members is the decision-making body of the institution. Minister for the Ministry of Industries is the chairperson of the counsel.

=== Wings ===
- Certification Marks (CM) wing
- Metrology wing
- Physical Testing wing
- Chemical Testing wing
- Standards wing
- Administration wing
- Management System Certification wing

== Membership ==
BSTI is member of following organisation:

- International Organization for Standardization (ISO)
- International Organization of Legal Metrology (OIML)
- Codex Alimentarius Commission (CAC)
- International Electrotechnical Commission (IEC)
- Standards and Metrology Institute for Islamic Countries (SMIIC)
- Asia Pacific Metrology Programme (APMP)
- Asian Forum for Information Technology (AFIT)
- Standing Group for Standardization, Metrology, Testing and Quality

== Offices ==
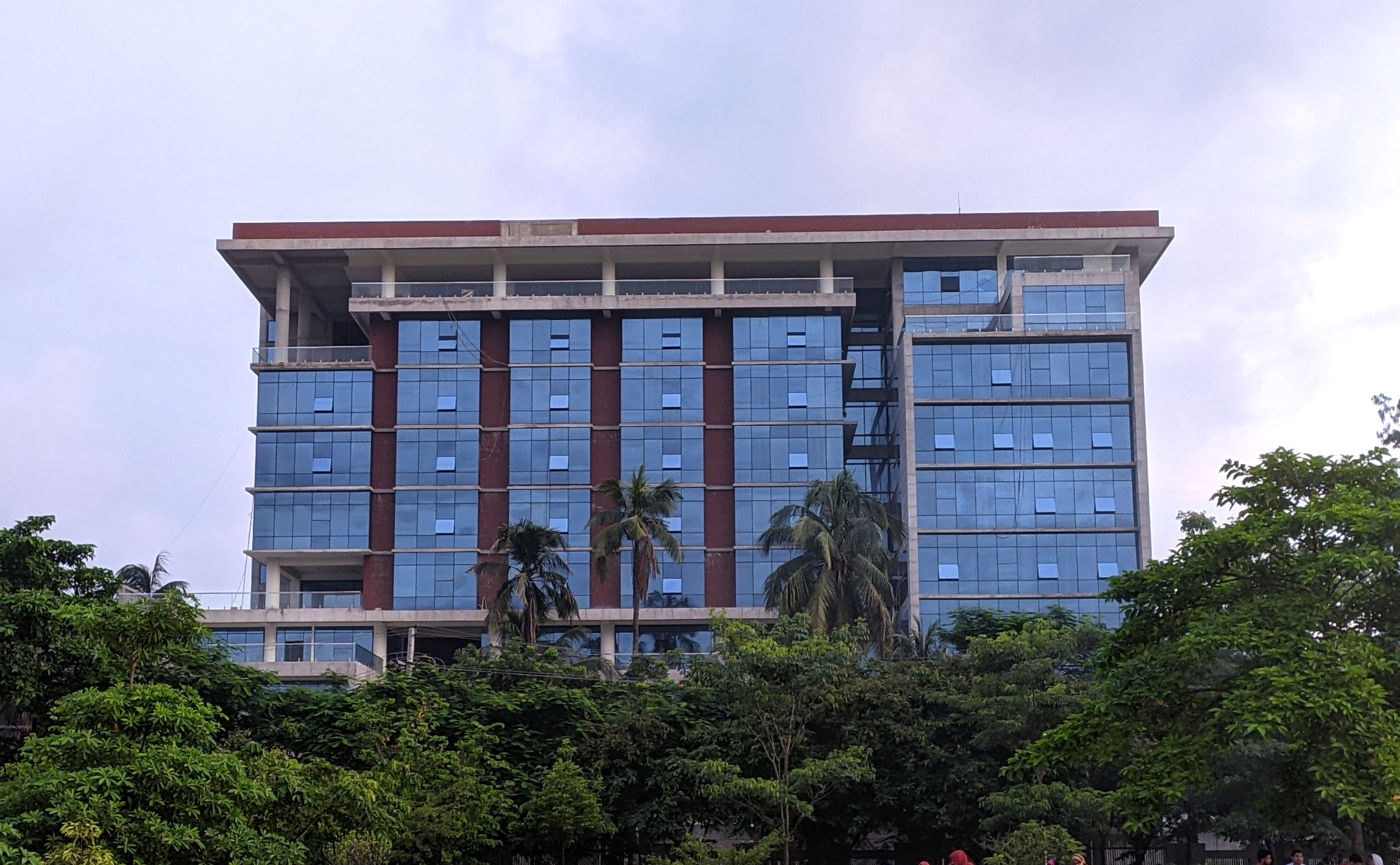
Chittagong Divisional office, located at Agrabad commercial area of the city.

BSTI Head office is located in Dhaka. It also has 8 divisional, 3 District and 10 Regional offices as follows:

Divisional Metrology Inspectorate, Dhaka; BSTI Divisional Office, Chittagong; BSTI Divisional Office, Rajshahi; BSTI Divisional Office, Khulna; BSTI Divisional Office, Barisal; BSTI Divisional Office, Sylhet; BSTI Divisional Office, Rangpur; BSTI Divisional Office, Mymensingh; BSTI Regional Office, Dinajpur; BSTI Regional Office, Naogaon; BSTI Regional Office, Pabna	BSTI Regional Office, Jashore; BSTI Regional Office, Gopalganj; BSTI Regional Office, Kushtia; BSTI Regional Office, Patuakhali; BSTI Regional Office, Gazipur; BSTI Regional Office, Noakhali; BSTI Regional Office, Narsingdi; BSTI District Office, Cumilla; BSTI District Office, Faridpur; BSTI District Office, Cox's Bazar
