= Agrabad =

Central business district in Chittagong, Bangladesh

Agrabad আগ্রাবাদ
- Central business district
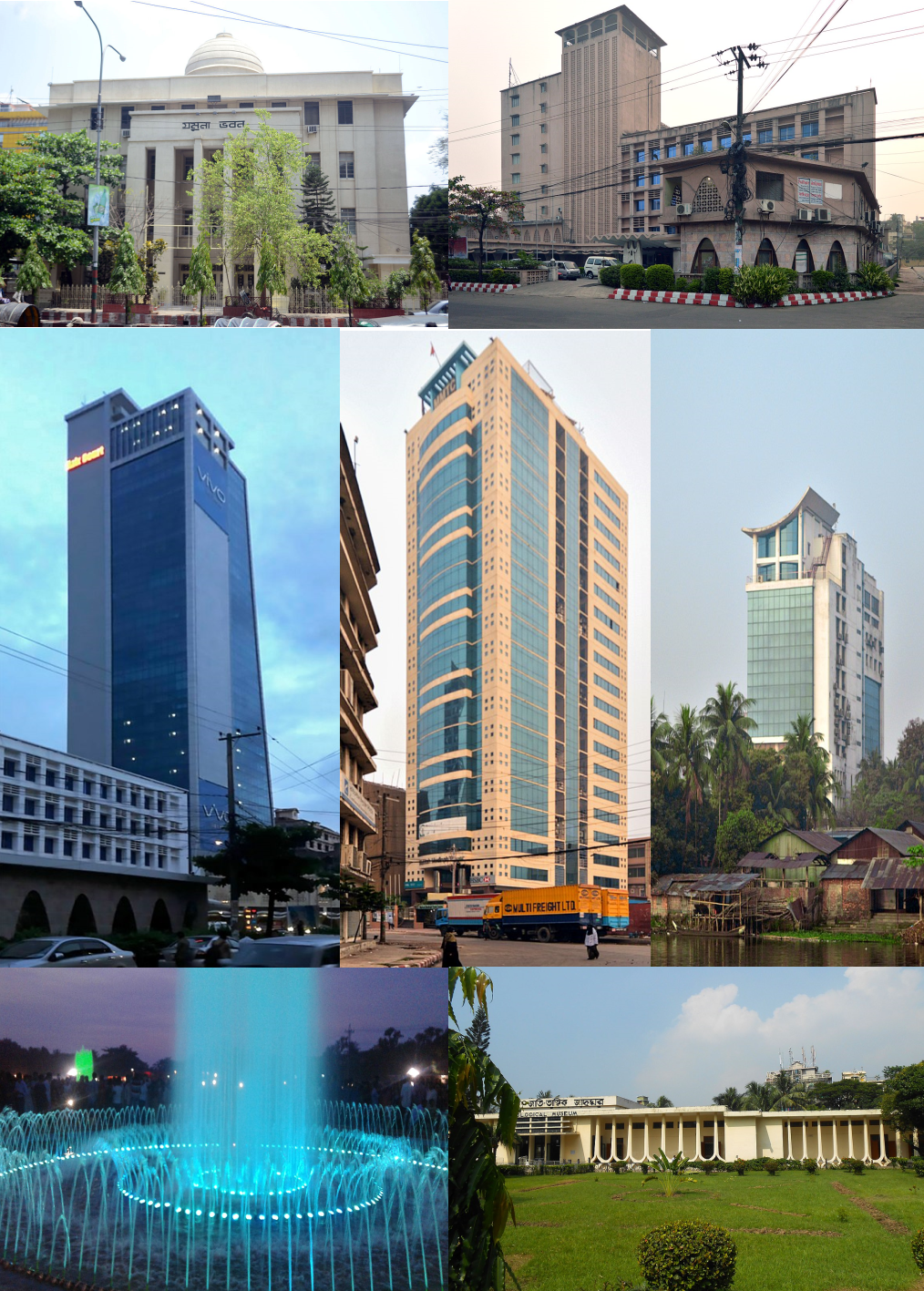
- Agrabad Commercial Area

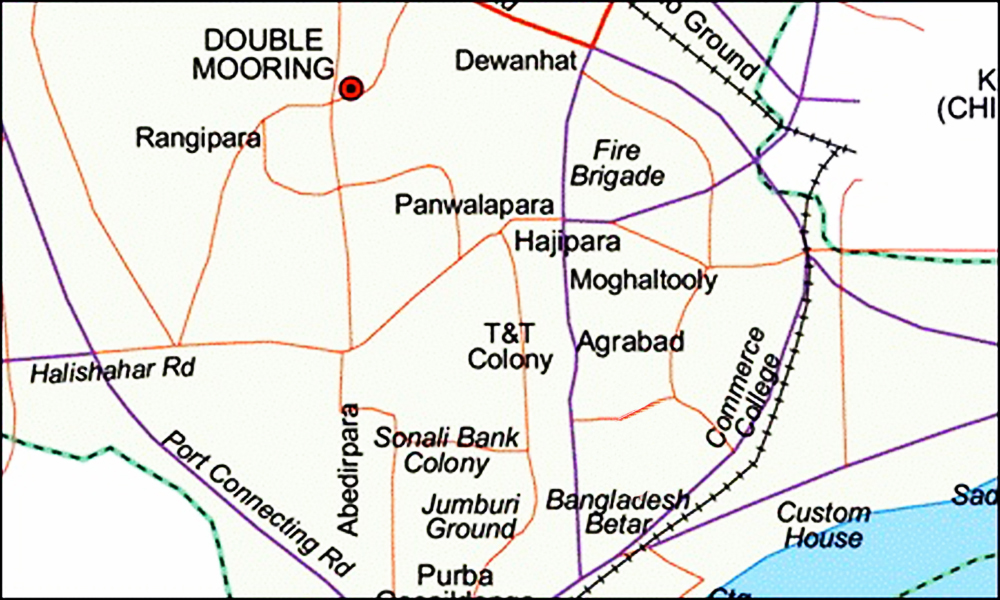
- Location map of Agrabad

- Location at Agrabad in Bangladesh
- Coordinates: 22.3237417°N 91.8091193°E
- Country: Bangladesh
- District: Chittagong
- Thana: Double Mooring
- Ward: 24 & 27
- Settled: c 1940s

Government
  - Type: Mayor–council
  - Body: Chittagong City Corporation
  - MP: Parliament abolished
  - City Mayor: Dr. Shahadat Hossain
- Demonym: Chittagonian
- Time zone: UTC+06:00 (BST)
- Postal code: 4100
- BTCL: (+88) 031

Agrabad (Bengali: আগ্রাবাদ) is a central business district in Chittagong, Bangladesh. Located close to the city's harbour, it hosts numerous Bangladeshi and international businesses, banks, financial institutions, and other commercial entities, including the Chittagong Chamber of Commerce & Industry, the World Trade Center, and the Chittagong Stock Exchange. The area forms part of the Double Mooring precinct and is directly connected to the Port of Chittagong. Agrabad is a key business centre in Bangladesh, along with Motijheel, Gulshan, Banani and Kawran Bazar.

Hotel Agrabad is one of the oldest hotels in the city. The area hosts many businesses, and government offices including the art deco offices of M. M. Ispahani Limited, the Jamuna Oil Company, BSTI divisional Office, Anti-Corruption commission etc. Other streets in Agrabad include Access Road and Sabdar Ali Road. The city's other commercial hubs on Strand Road and Sadarghat are located nearby.

== History ==
The Chittagong Development Authority (CDA) was established in 1959 for urban planning. In the early 1960s, CDA created the 82-acre Agrabad CDA residential area. It envisioned the area housing government workers, whose offices would be located in Agrabad. As Agrabad developed, properties near the Karnaphuli River were turned to business uses, creating the Agrabad Commercial Area.

In 1995, the Chittagong Stock Exchange (CSE) opened in Agrabad. The CSE emerged as one of the twin stock markets of Bangladesh. Computerized transactions were introduced on the floor of the CSE in 1998. In 1999, the Bangladesh Securities and Exchange Commission enacted specific regulations for the CSE, including the CSE Automatic Transaction Regulation and the Chittagong Stock Exchange Investors Protection Fund Regulation.

Agrabad's average elevation is 0.42 metres (1 ft 5 in). As of 2020, the average high tide there is 2.51 metres (8 ft 3 in). Since the early 1990s, the residential area has suffered regular inundation. As of 2018, the roads of the residential area are flooded at least waist deep for several hours twice a day during about a third of each month. Once an affluent neighborhood, it has become a low rent area of absentee landlords. Tidal flooding has also reached the Chattogram Maa-O-Shishu Hospital Medical College and the World Trade Center Chittagong in the commercial area.

== Commercial activities ==
Many of Bangladesh's largest companies, as well as various multinational firms, have their headquarters or branches located in Agrabad. There are many private commercial banks including AB Bank Limited, Bangladesh Commerce Bank Limited, BRAC Bank Limited, The City Bank Limited, Dhaka Bank Limited, Dutch Bangla Bank Limited, Eastern Bank Limited, IFIC Bank Limited, Mercantile Bank Limited, Mutual Trust Bank Ltd., National Bank Limited, NCC Bank Limited, One Bank Limited, The Premier Bank Limited, Prime Bank Limited, Southeast Bank Limited, Standard Bank Limited, Trust Bank Limited, United Commercial Bank Ltd., Uttara Bank Limited etc.
Some Islamic commercial banks are also located in Agrabad. They include Islami Bank of Bangladesh Limited, Export Import Bank of Bangladesh Limited, Shahjalal Islami Bank Limited, Al-Arafah Islami Bank Limited.
Major foreign commercial banks located in Agrabad include Citibank NA, HSBC, Standard Chartered Bank, Commercial Bank of Ceylon, State Bank of India and National Bank of Pakistan.
There are many Specialized development banks are Bangladesh Krishi Bank, BASIC Bank Limited,
There are also located kinds of Non-bank financial institution, Insurance company, Telecommunication company and others multinational companies are located. Chittagong Chamber of Commerce & Industry, The World Trade Center Chittagong (WTC Chittagong) etc. commercial building located in the Agrabad Commercial Area.

Agrabad's 2nd economy hub in Bangladesh.

== Institutions and structures ==
Government buildings

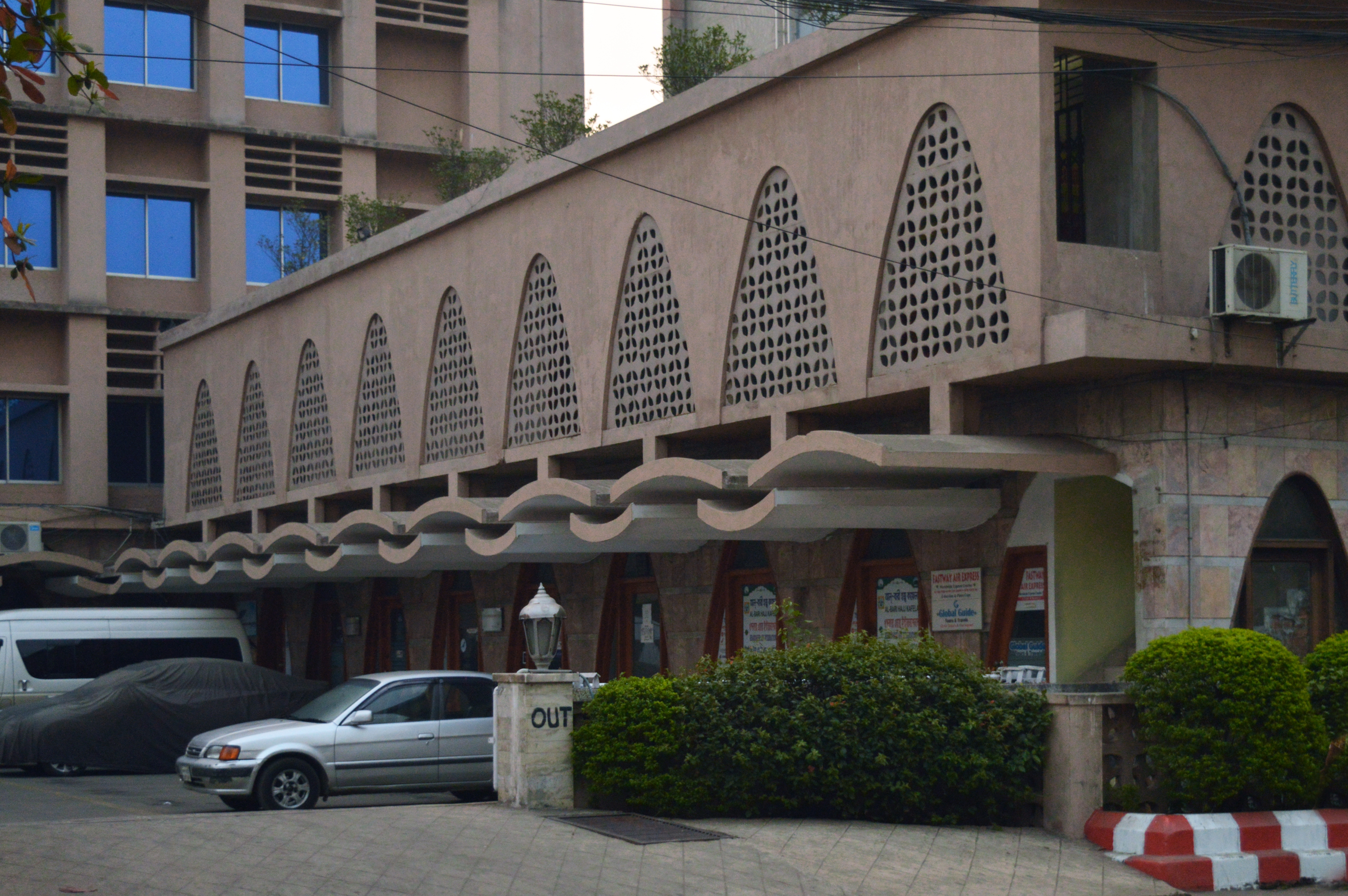
Hotel Agrabad

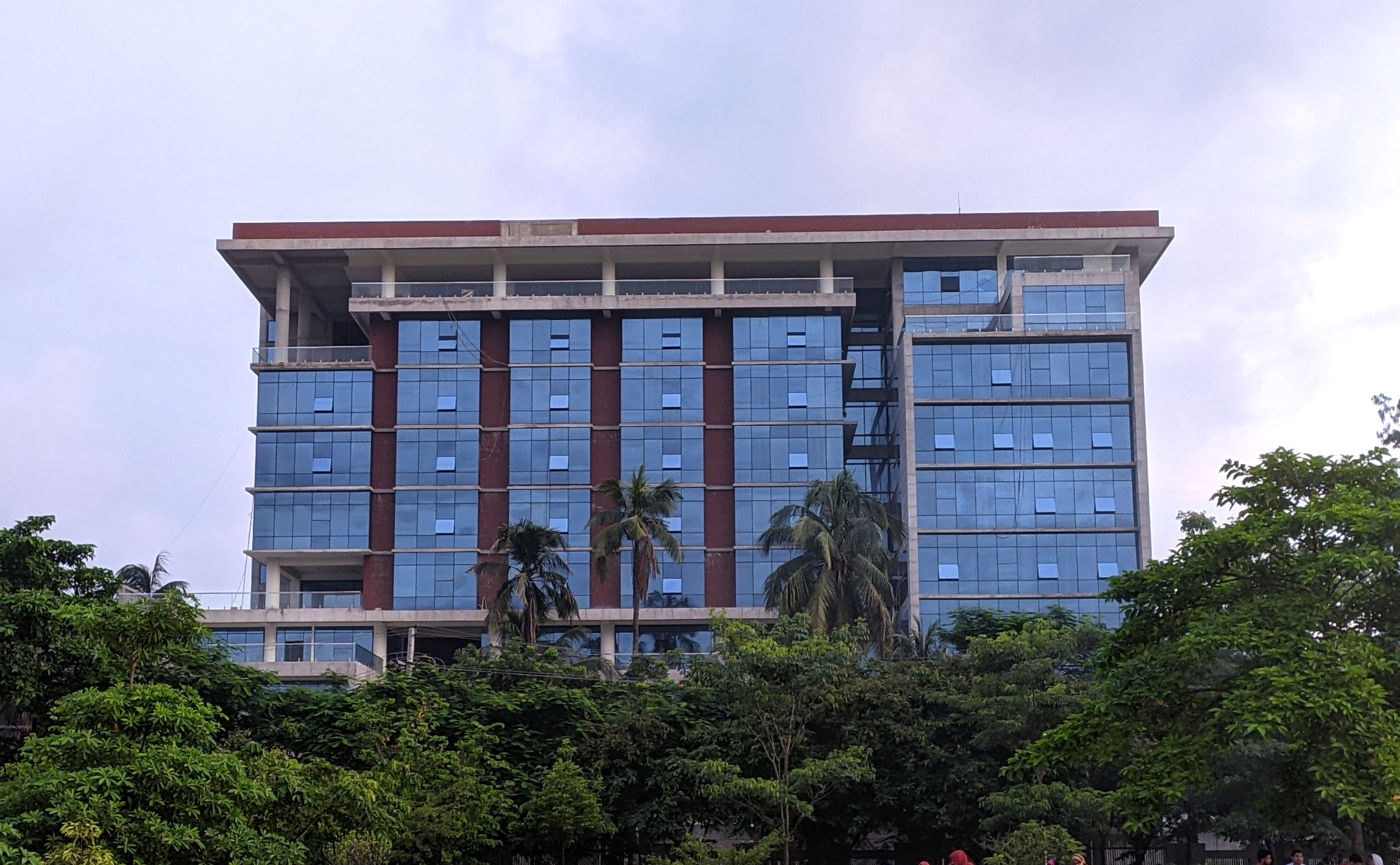
BSTI Divisional Office

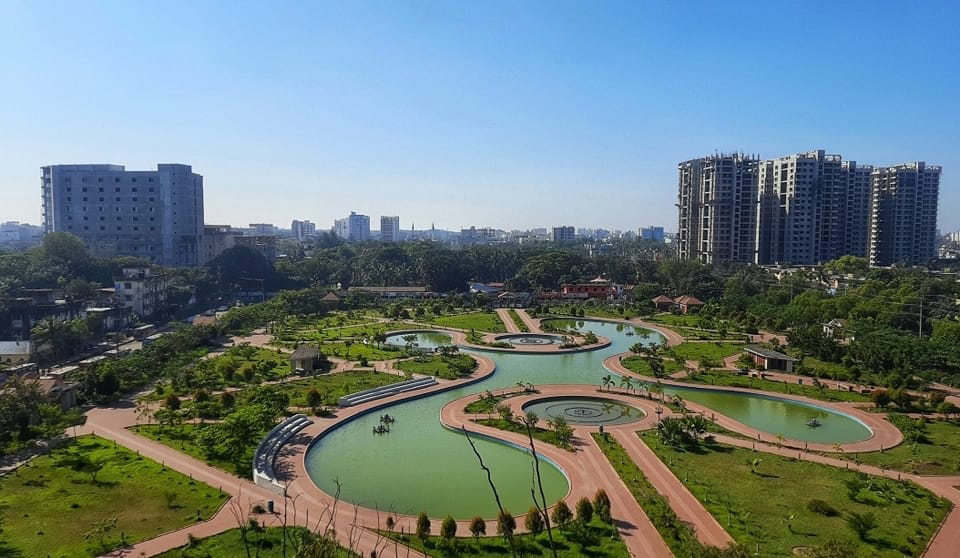
Jamboree Park

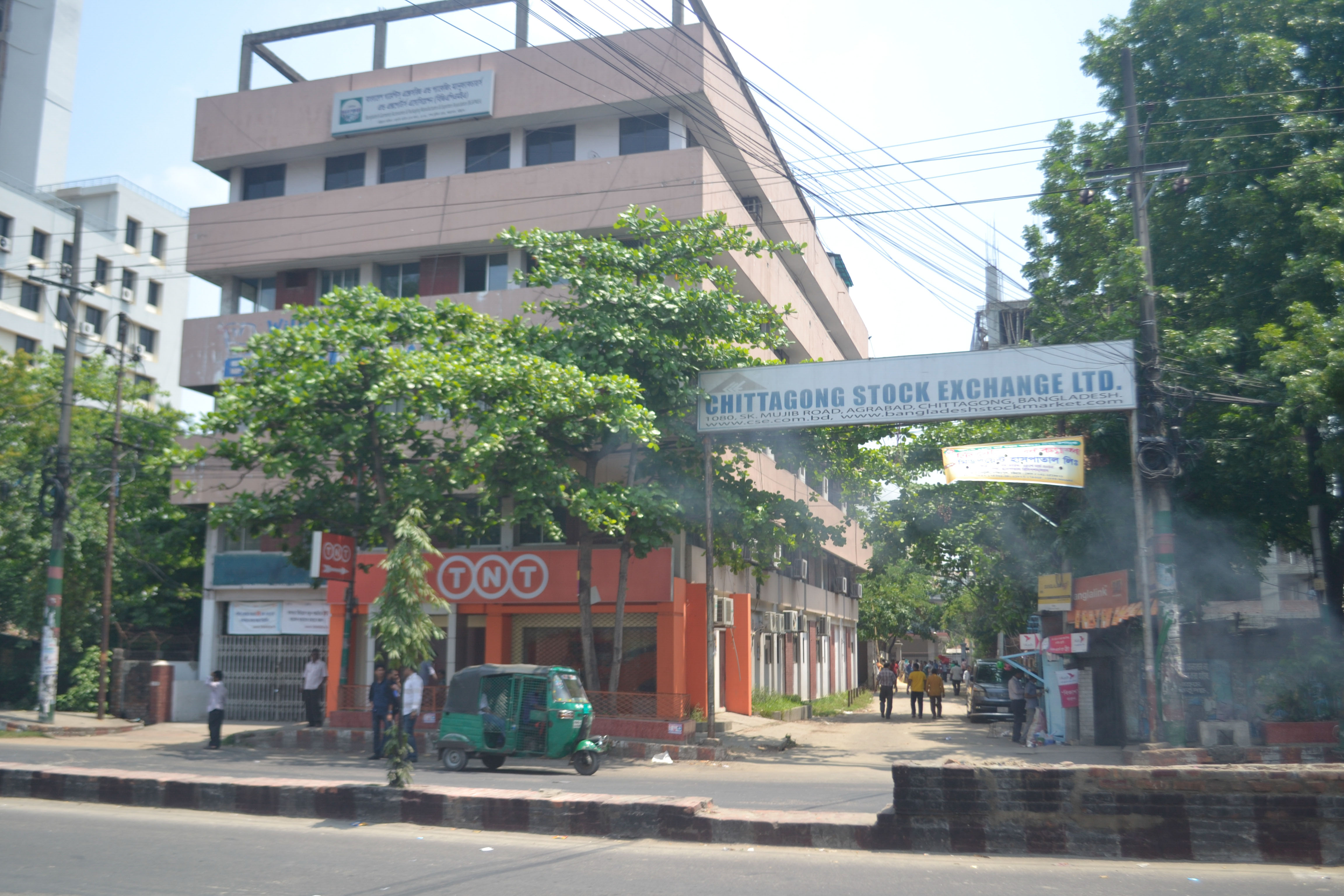
Chittagong Stock Exchange

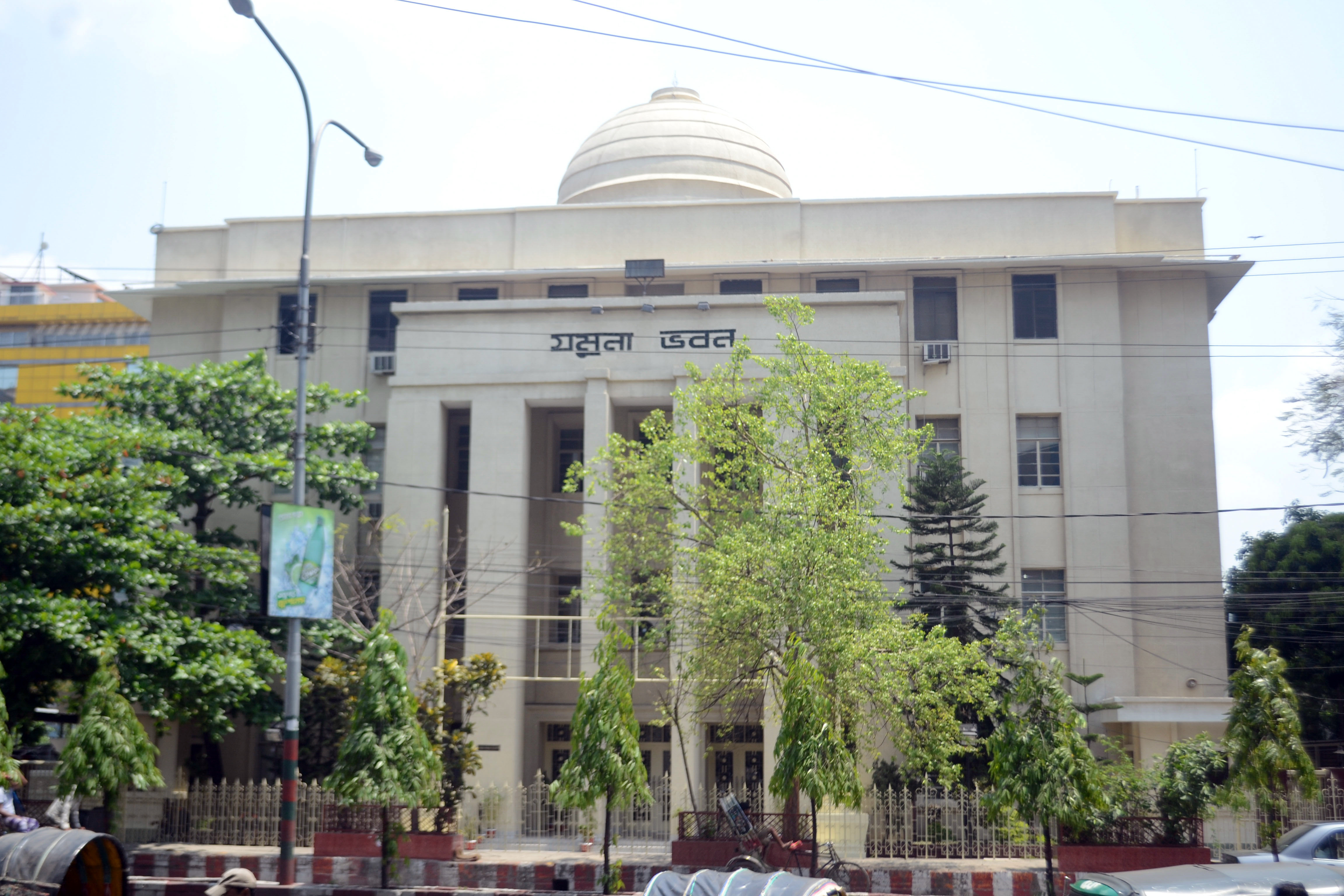
Jamuna Bhaban

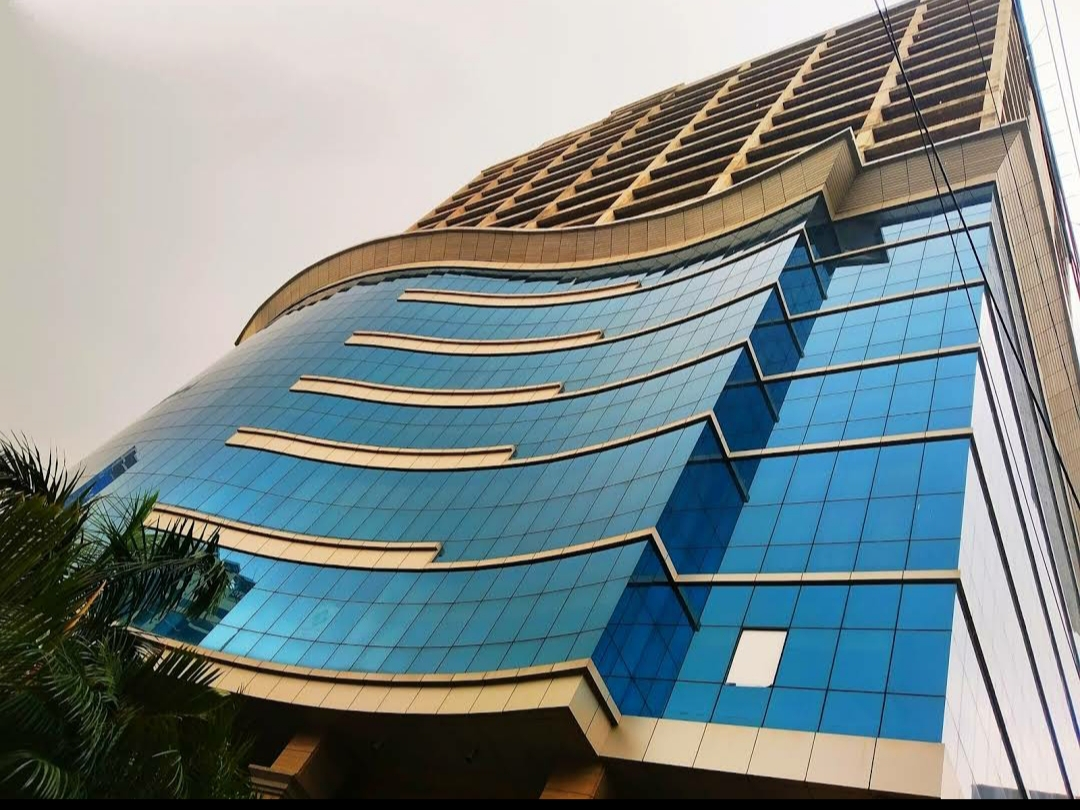
The partly-completed World Trade Center Chittagong. Construction of most of the building's upper floors remain incomplete and unfinished.

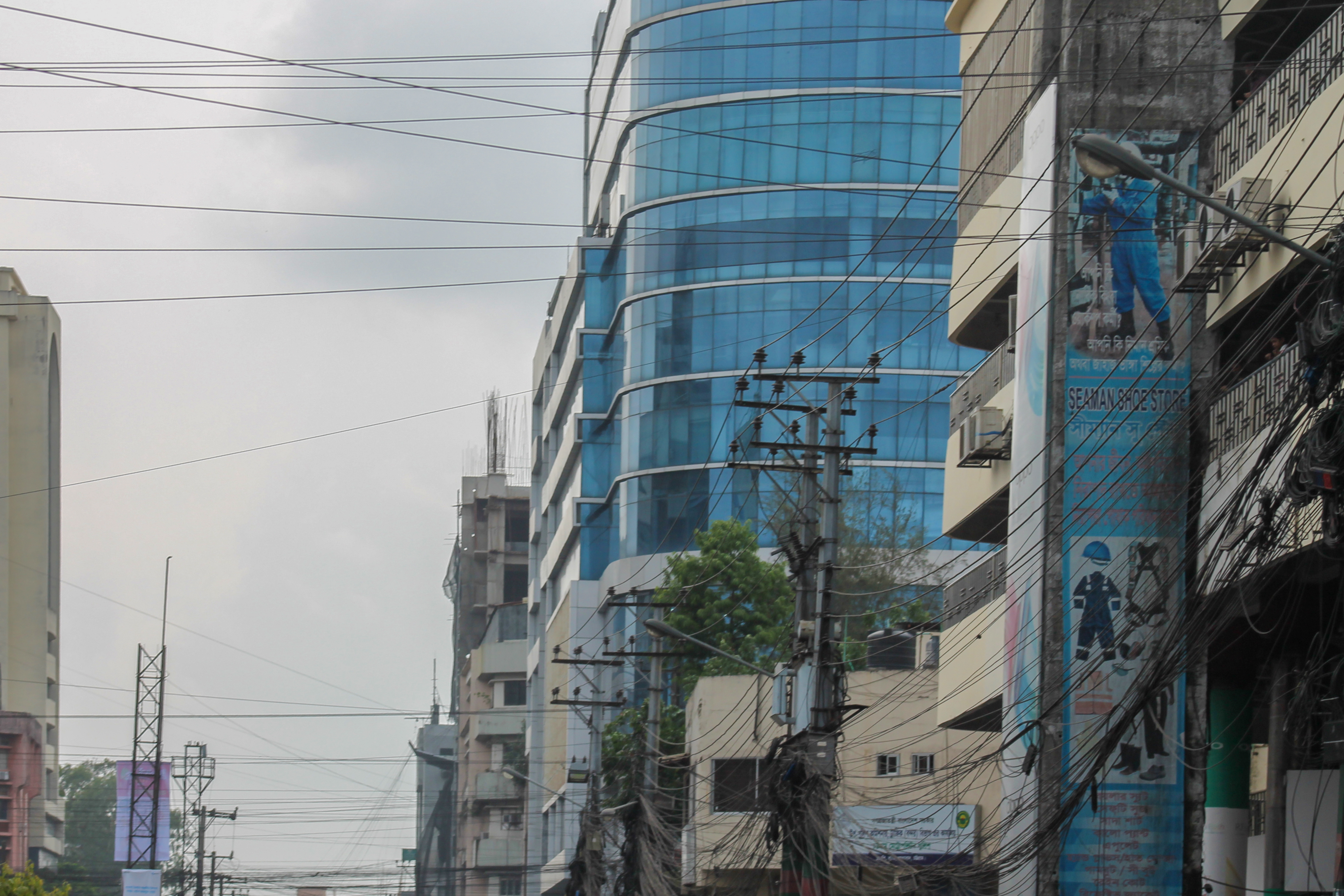
Akhtaruzzaman Center and Singapore-Bangkok Market

- BSTI Divisional office
- Bidyut Bhaban
- BTCL Building
- BSCIC Building
- Chittagong Government Office Buildings (CGO)

Other high-rises

- Aziz Court Imperial
- Banani Complex
- C&F Tower
- Makkah Madina Trade Centre
- World Trade Center Chittagong
- Madina Tower 71

Government Colonies

- Agrabad CGS (Masjid) Colony, aka Chittagong Government Service Colony
- Agrabad Multi Storied Colony
- Agrabad Government C&B Colony
- Bangladesh Bank Colony
- Bahutola Colony
- Gazetted Officers' Colony
- Health Colony
- Postal Officers' Colony
- P. T. & T. Colony
- WASA Staff Colony

Shopping Complex

- Akhtaruzzaman Center
- EBL (Eastern Bank Ltd) Street Market
- Lucky Plaza
- New Dubai IT Bhaban
- Southland Center
- Singapore Bangkok Market

Community Centre

- Agrabad Community Center
- Agrabad Convention Hall
- Guljer Convention Center

Hotel & Restaurant

- Hotel Agrabad
- Orchid Business Hotel
- Landmark Hotel
- Shangri-La Chinese Restaurant
- Silver Spoon
- Best Western Alliance Hotel

== Tourism ==
=== Ethnological Museum ===
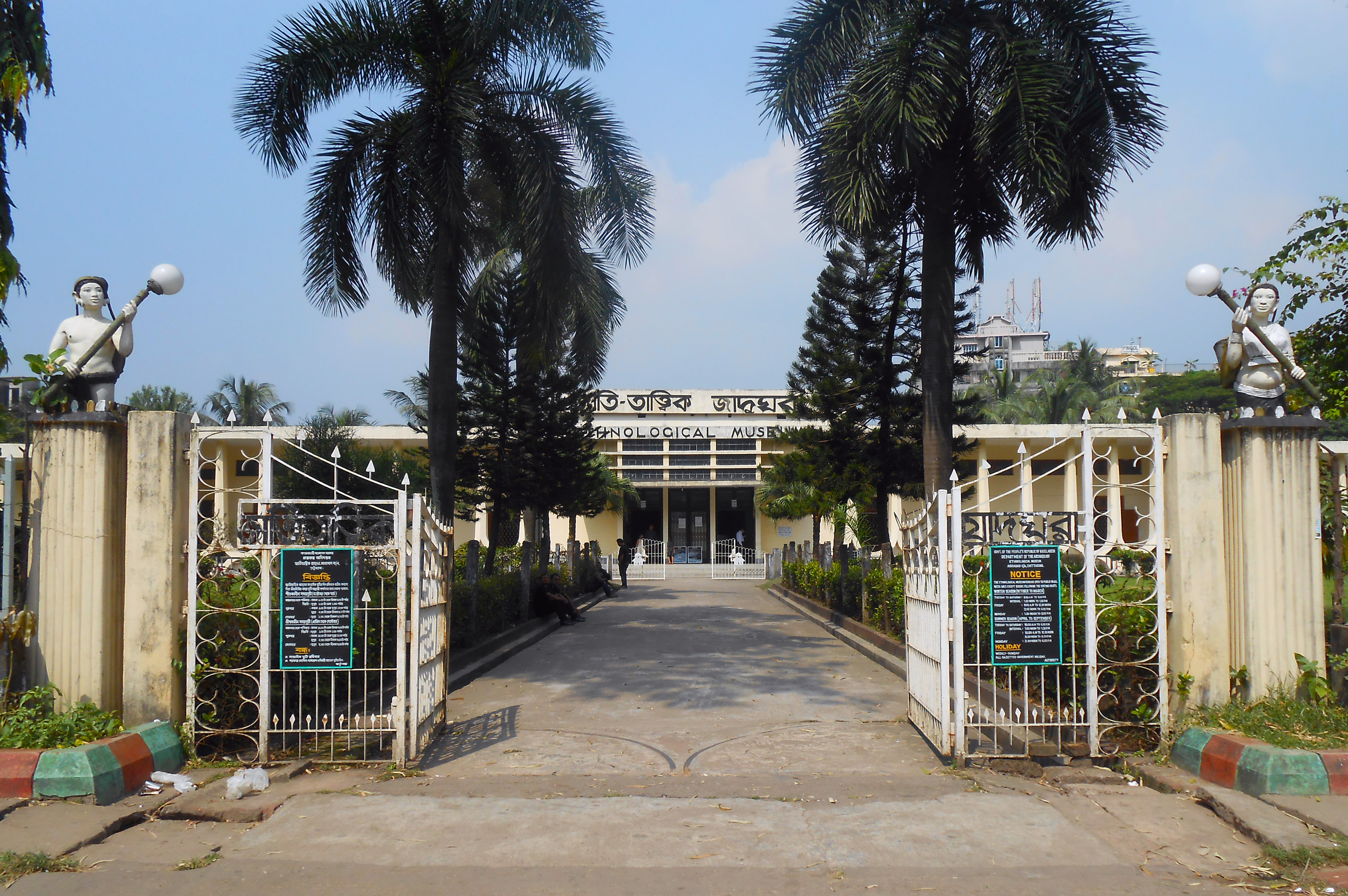
Ethnological Museum of Chittagong

The Ethnological Museum established in 1965, is the only ethnological museum in the country. It offers the visitors the chance to acquaint with the lifestyles and heritage of various ethnic groups of the country. The museum authority had collected rare elements used in the everyday lives of different ethnic groups, of which some had already become extinct while some were on the verge of extinction. It contains four galleries and a small hall. Three galleries of the museum feature diverse elements of twenty nine ethnic groups in Bangladesh, while the rest of the gallery displays the lifestyles of some ethnic groups of India, Pakistan and Australia.

The sculptures of the people of different ethnic communities and a piece of broken Berlin Wall attracts visitors, which close to display since 2017. People can get the impression of different festivals, livelihoods, and cultures of the communities from the murals set up at the hall room. These are reminiscent of the museum in the film Planet of the Apes. Around 200–300 people visit the museum every day.

=== Jamboree Park ===
Jamboree Park is one of the most visited urban park located at SM Morshed Road at central Agrabad and visited by tourists and locals. The park offers a view at night with several hundred lamps on its pool-like body of water and walkways.

=== Agrabad Deba ===
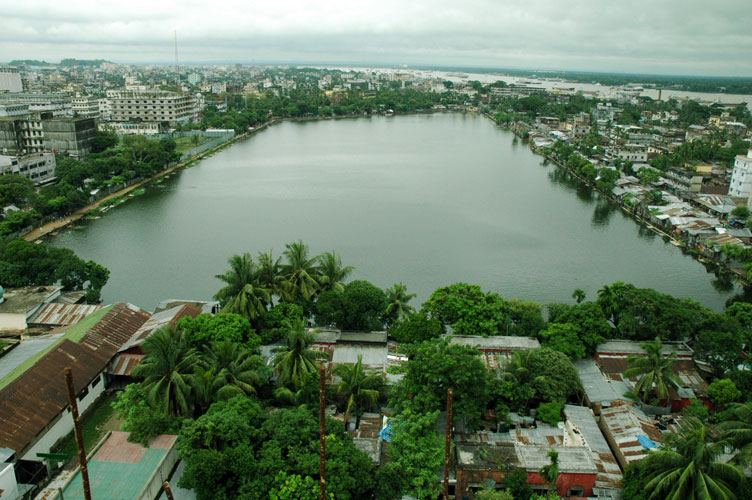
Agrabad Deba

Agrabad Deba pool (small body of water in Bengali) is about 14 acres human-made water reservoir is being this place in the Agrabad commercial area beside Sheikh Mujib Road since the last century. The pool is a place for flyfishing, where it arranging fishing competition every year. It was dug for the Bangladesh Railway and employees of the Port of Chittagong as well as the Chittagong city dwellers during the British period to carry out their daily chores and other activities. After the water reservoir owned by the Bangladesh Railway.

=== Karnaphuli Shishu Park ===
Karnaphuli Shishu Park was a recreation park for children near Jamburee Park in Agrabad which is closed since August 2024.

== Education ==
Private medical colleges

- Chattogram Maa-O-Shishu Hospital Medical College

Colleges

- Agrabad Mohila College
- Government Commerce College

Schools

- Agrabad Government Colony High School
- Bangladesh Bank Colony High School
- Khawja Ajmeri High School
- Silver Bells Kindergarten & Girls' High School

== Health ==
- Chattagram Maa-O-Shishu Hospital

== Media ==
- Bangladesh Betar, Chittagong

== Transportation ==
Sheikh Mujib Road

Transport in Agrabad is similar to that of the city, Chittagong. Several roads are present throughout the area. There are various bus transport systems and taxi services, as well as smaller 'baby' or 'CNG' taxis, which are basically tricycle-structured motor vehicles. There are also traditional manual rickshaws, which are very common.

The Agrabad Access road and Sheikh Mujib road are a major arterial road, is the main way to access the area by motor vehicle and otherwise. Those are considered a very busy and populated road, and though are currently 2-lane road.

=== Agrabad Access Road ===
Agrabad Access Road is a main commercial road located at Agrabad. It is extended to the south side, between Double Mooring Thana and Halishahar Thana. The road started from Badamtali, and crossed Bepari Para, Shantibag, and Boropool.

=== Sabdar Ali Road ===
Sabdar Ali Road is a main commercial road located at Agrabad commercial area in central Agradad. It is extended to the eastern side, beside Agrabad Access Road. The road started from Badamtali and connected with Commerce College Road with surrounded to the total commercial area.

== Gallery ==
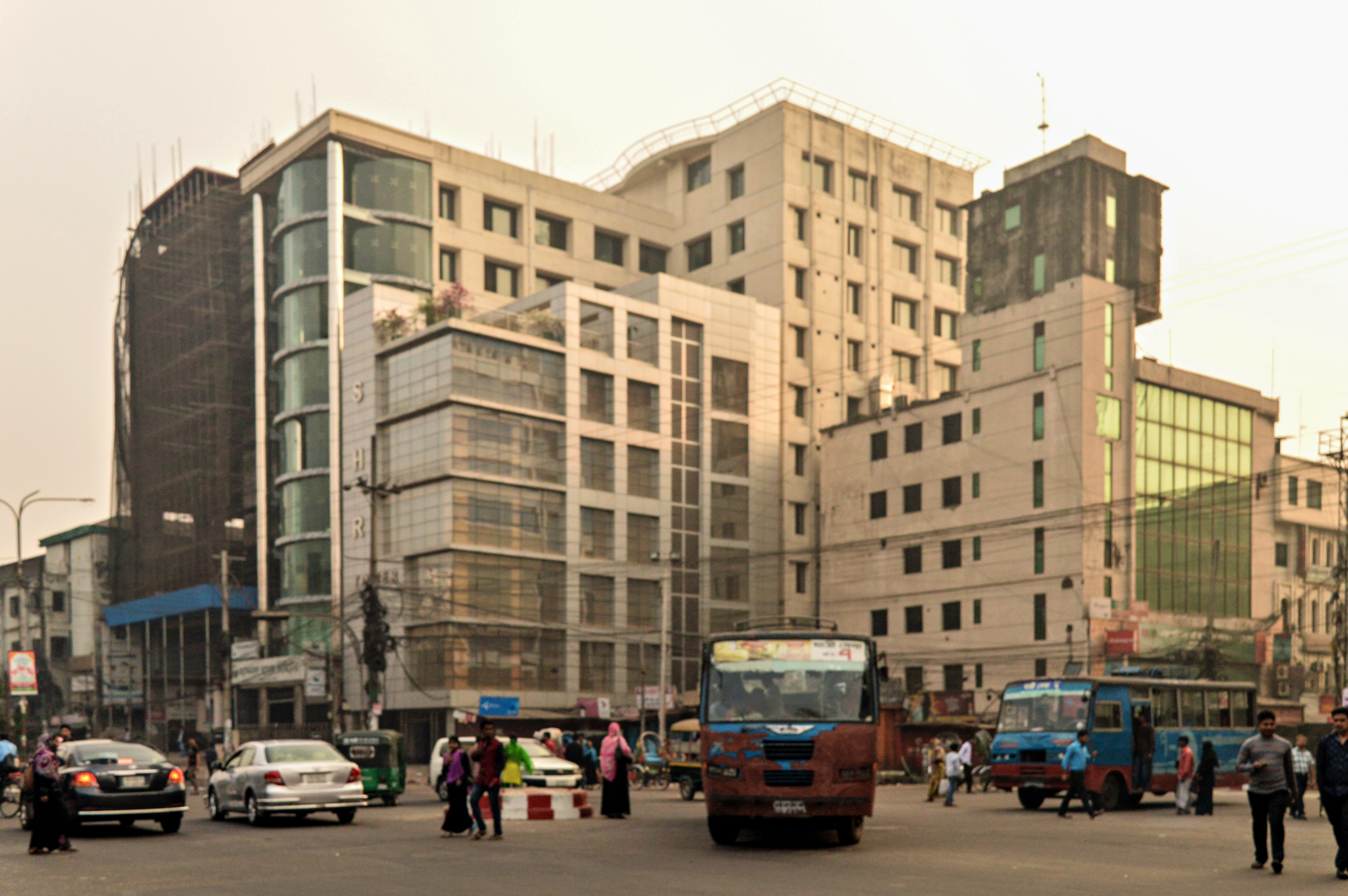
Badamtali

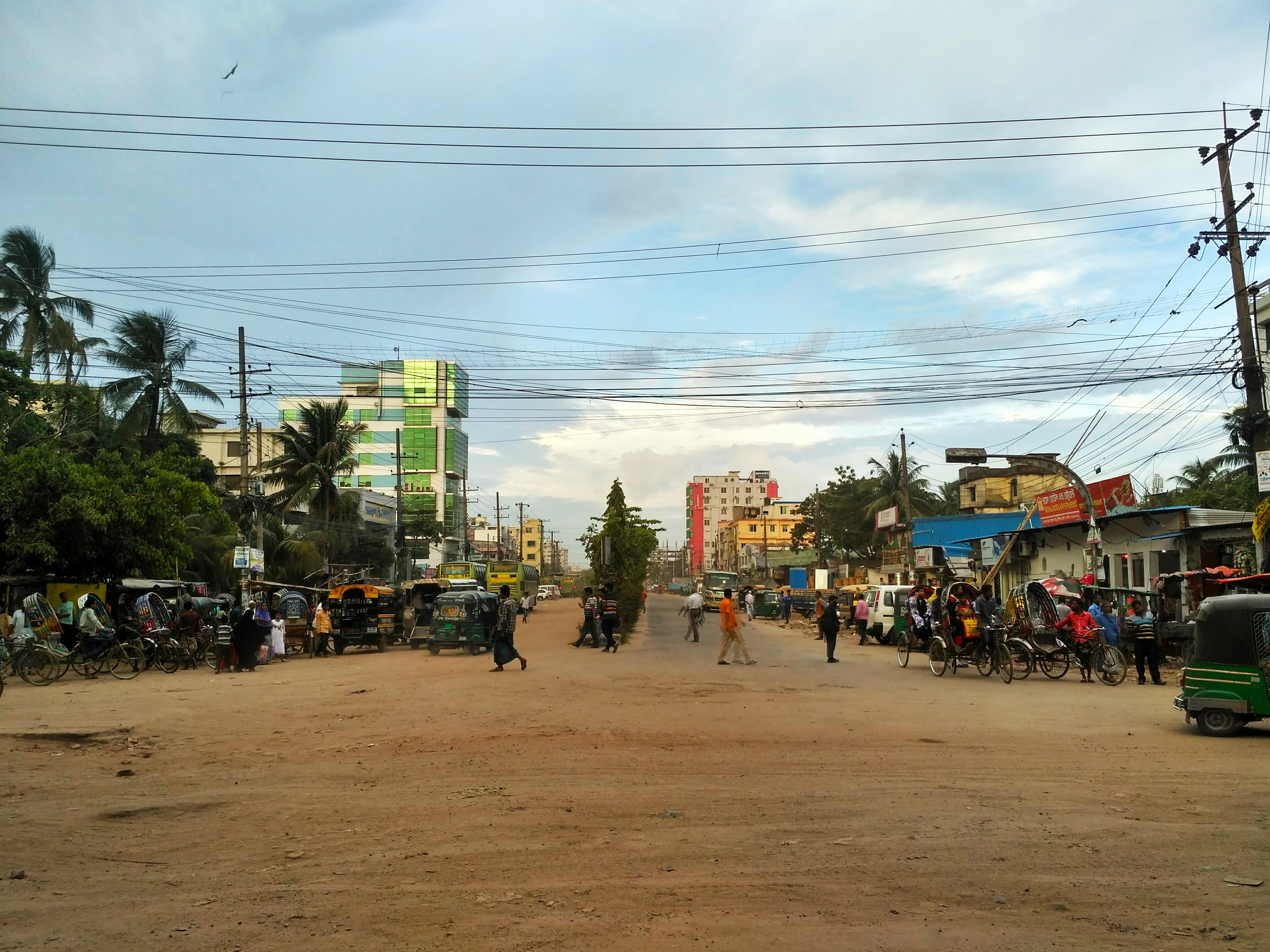
Agrabad Access Road

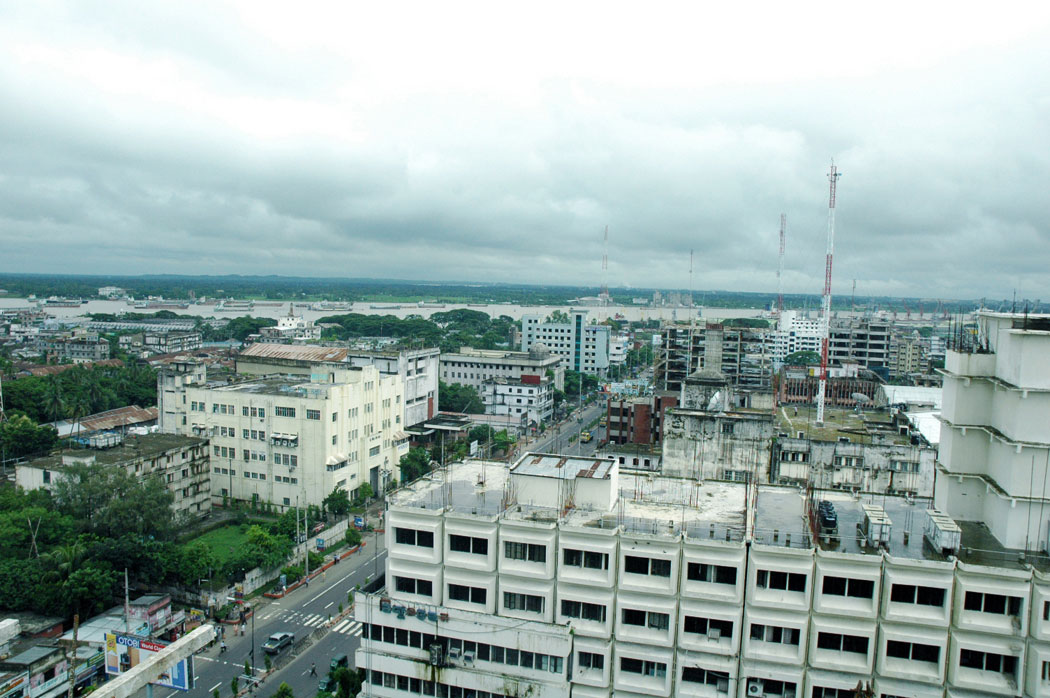
Top view of Agrabad

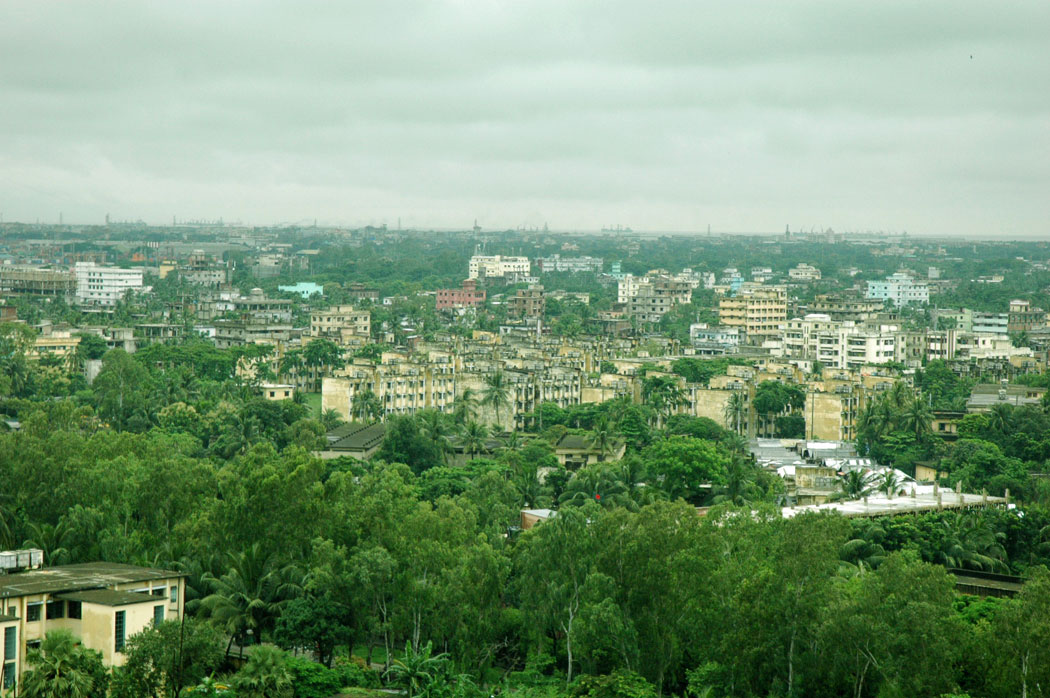
Top view of government colony

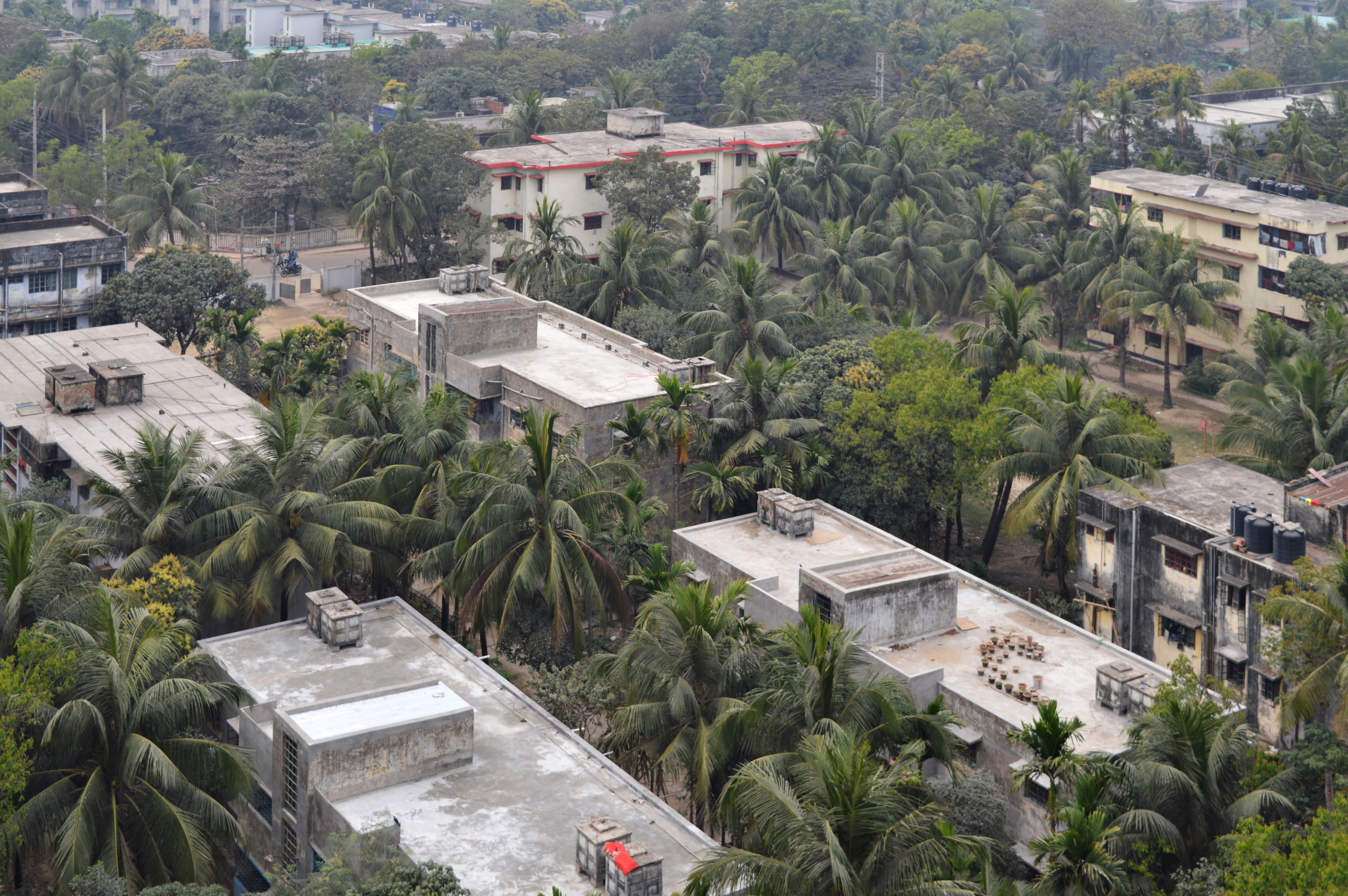
Aerial view of Postal Officers Colony from C&F Tower

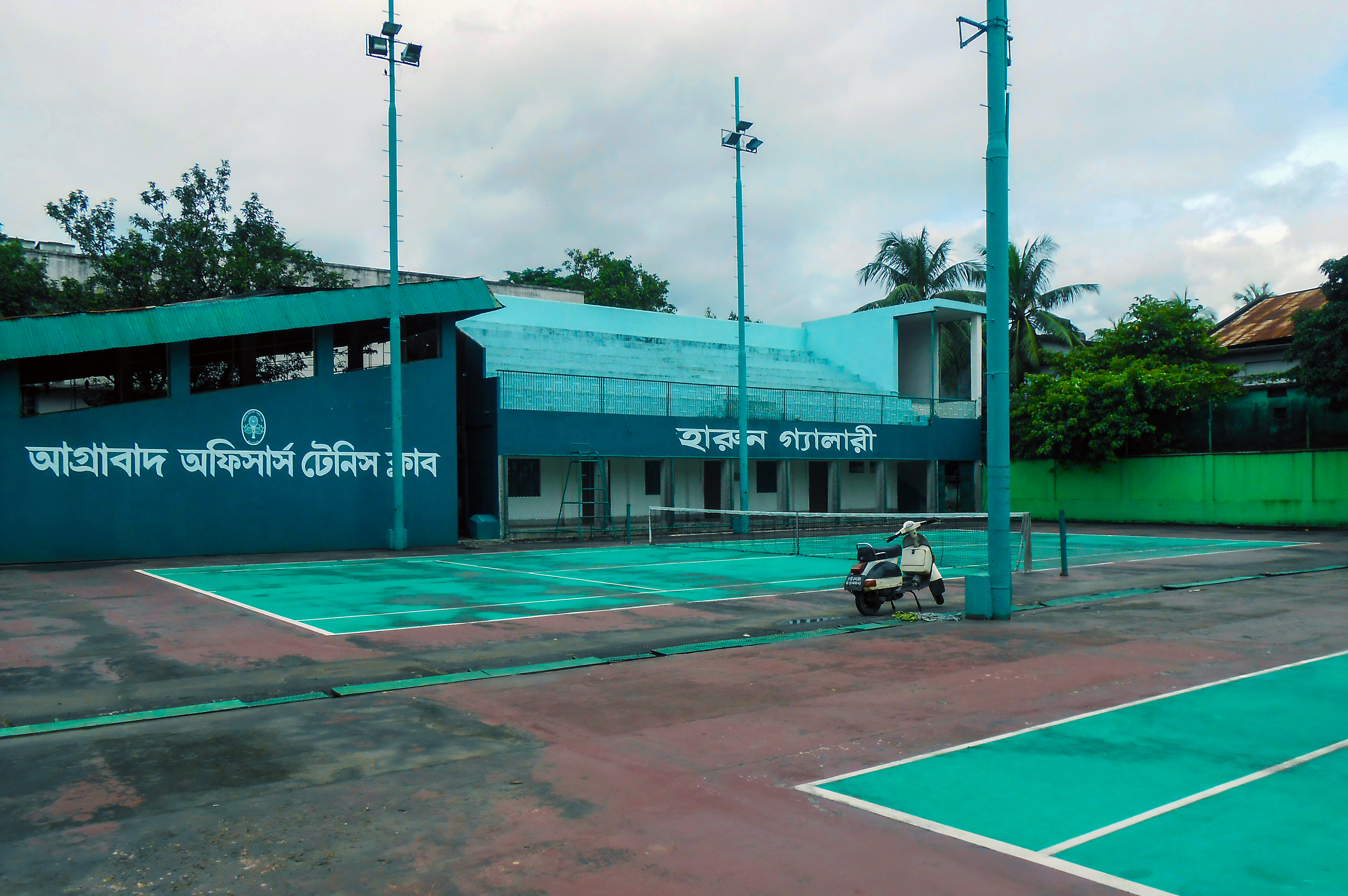
Agrabad Officer's Tenis Club

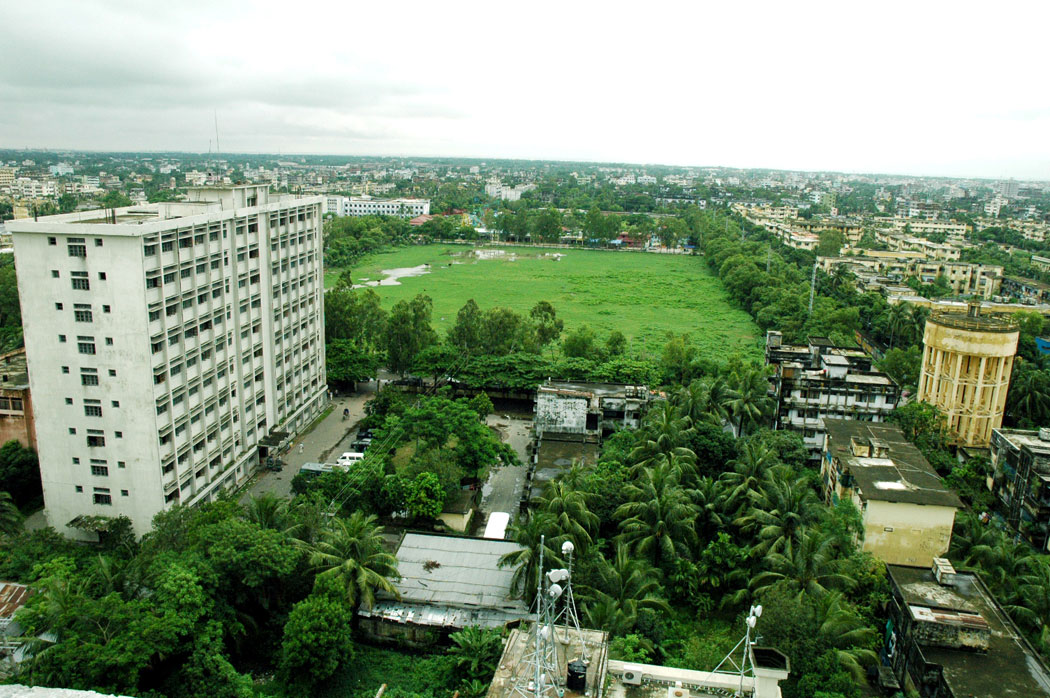
Chittagong Government Officer's Building

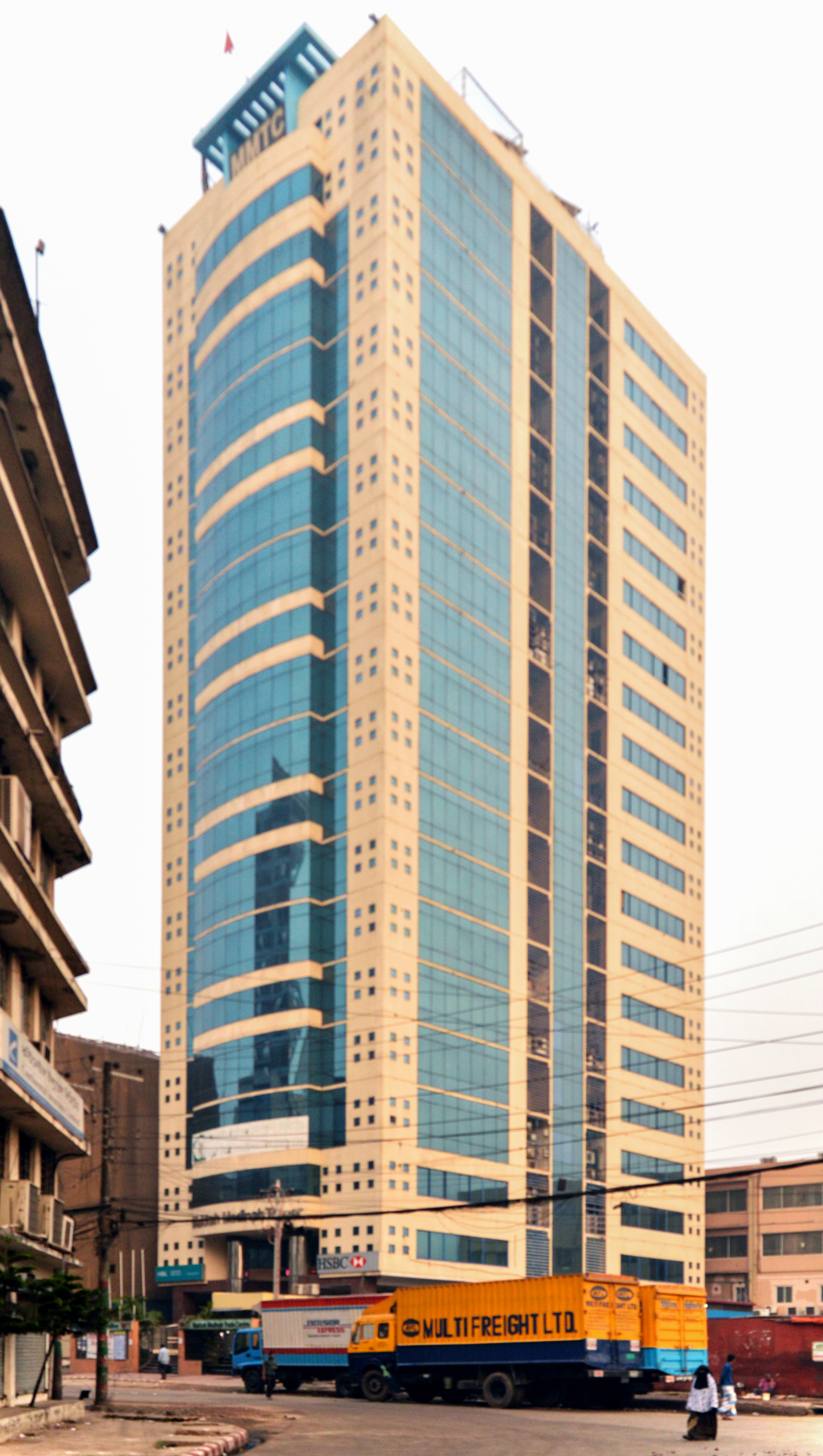
Makkah Madina Trade Centre

== See also ==
- Chittagong District
- Chittagong Division
