= World Trade Center Chittagong =

- ওয়ার্ল্ড ট্রেড সেন্টার চট্টগ্রাম
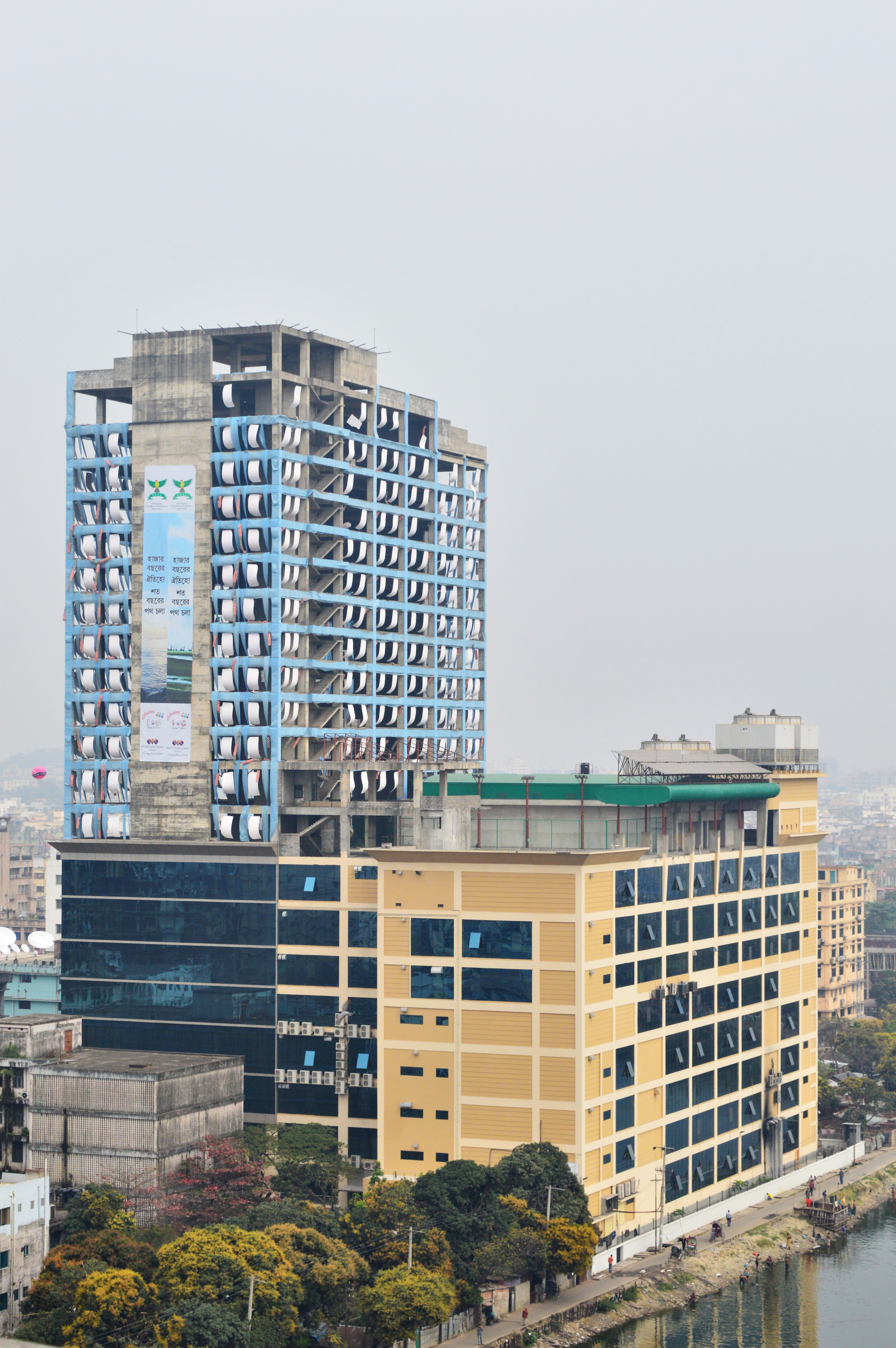
- Side view of World Trade Center Chittagong
- Interactive map of the World Trade Center Chittagong area
- Alternative names: World Trade Center

General information
- Status: Topped-out
- Type: Commercial
- Location: 102-103, Agrabad C/A, Chittagong, Bangladesh
- Coordinates: 22.3257°N 91.8149°E
- Construction started: August 29, 2006
- Opened: January 30, 2016
- Cost: BDT 2 billion
- Owner: Chittagong Chamber of Commerce and Industry (CCCI)

Height
- Roof: 90.70 meters (297.6 feet)

Technical details
- Floor count: 21 (plus 3 basement levels)
- Floor area: 62,609 m^{2} (673,920 sq ft)
- Grounds: 75 kathas

Design and construction
- Main contractor: Concord Engineers and Construction Limited

Other information
- Parking: Basement

The World Trade Center Chittagong (also called WTC Chittagong), is an unfinished 90.70 meters (297.6 feet), 21-floor complex located in Agrabad Commercial Area, Chittagong, Bangladesh.

The construction was inaugurated by former Prime Minister Khaleda Zia in 2006. The building was opened in 2016, inaugurated by Sheikh Hasina but the building has been partially constructed with the most of its floors remaining incomplete. The project cost was estimated at Tk 2 billion.

This is the first World Trade Center in Bangladesh. Concord Group constructed this project. Concord Group introduced and implemented Top Down construction technology in this building.

== Complex ==
The Chittagong World Trade Center has the following facilities:

- 5-star hotel
- International standard convention hall
- Conference center
- Exhibition hall
- World Trade Centre Club
- 3 basement car parking for 400 cars
- Media center
- Office block
- Block for financial institutions
- IT Zone
- Headquarters for the Chittagong Chamber of Commerce & Industry

== Gallery ==
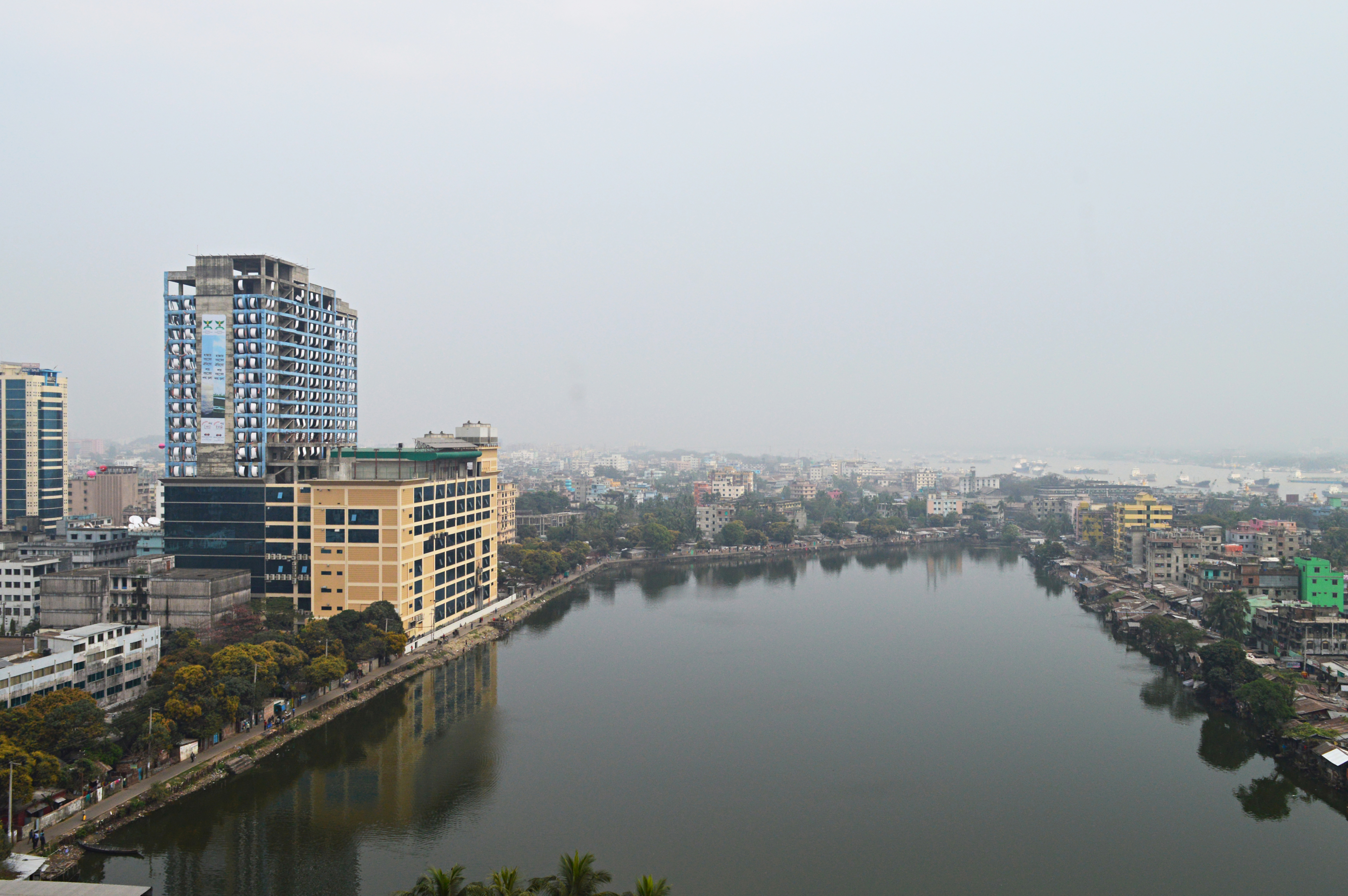
Side view of WTC

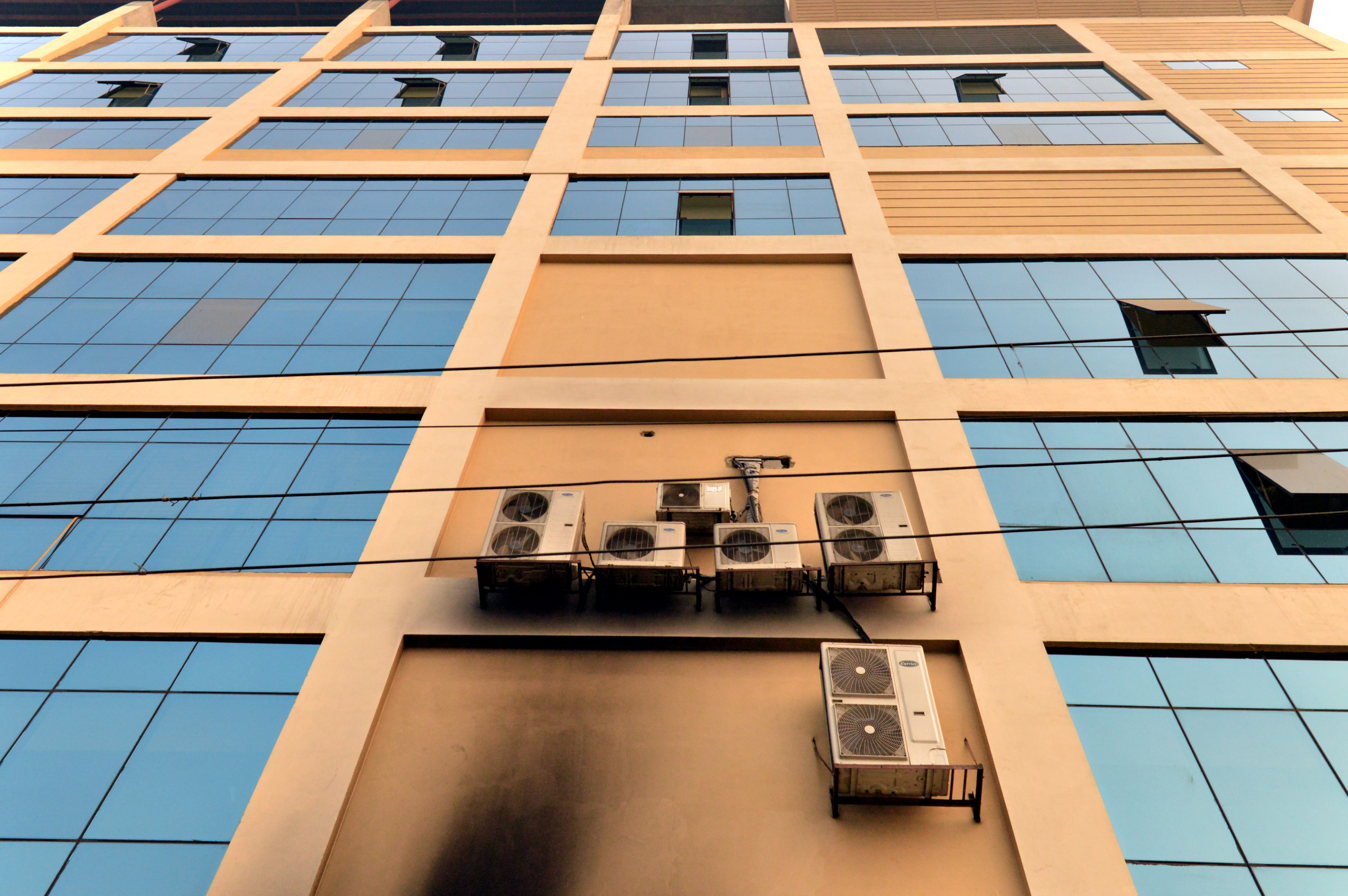
back view

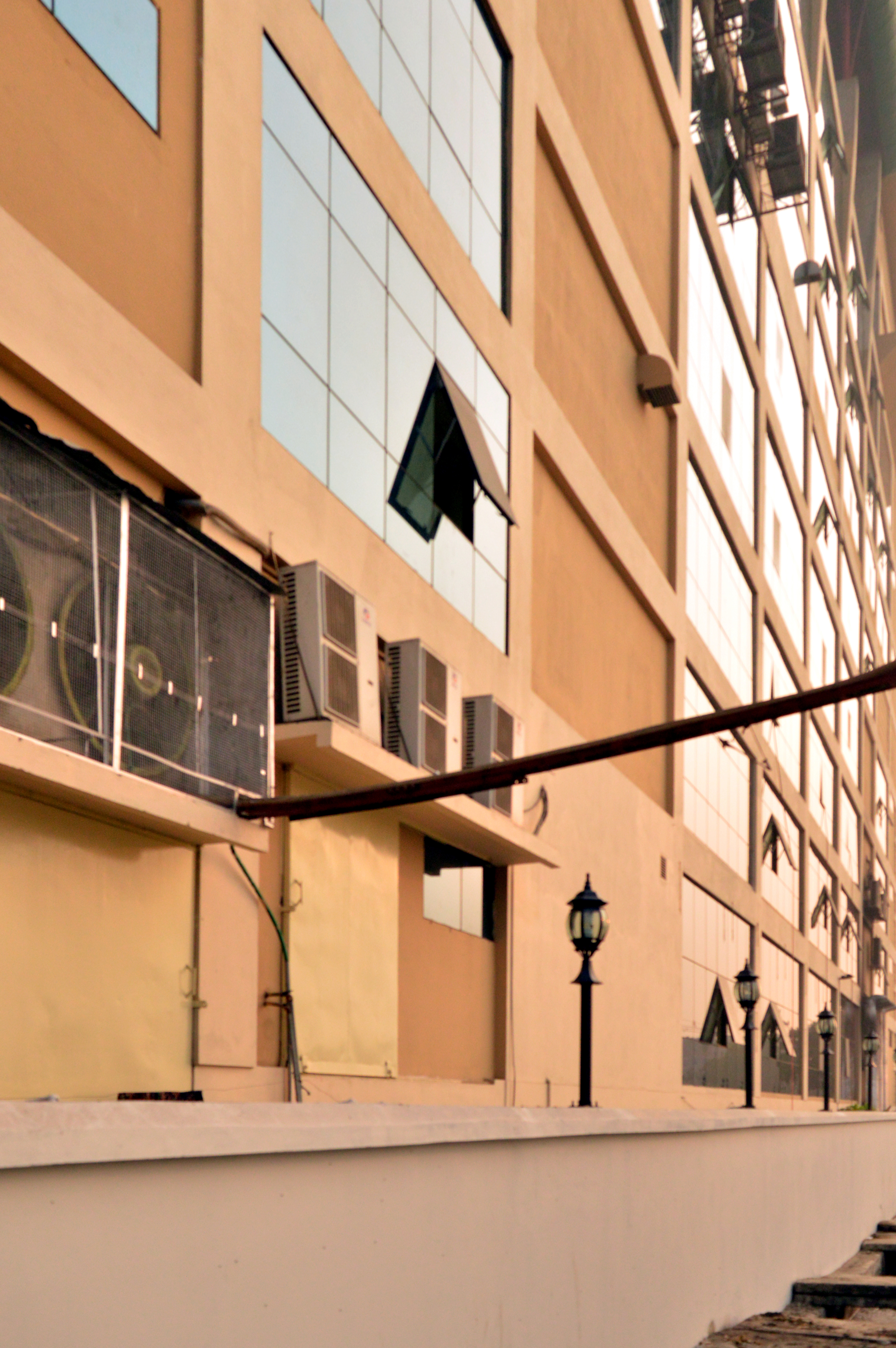
back view
