= Jannatul Ferdous =

Jannatul Ferdous, Ferdus or Ferdoush may refer to:

- Jannatul Ferdus (cricketer) (born 1999), Bangladeshi female cricketer
- Jannatul Ferdous Peya (born 1991), Bangladeshi model and actress
- Jannatul Ferdous (politician), Bangladeshi teacher and politician
- Jannatul Ferdous Ivy, Bangladeshi producer, writer and disability rights activist
- Jannatul Ferdous Oishee, Bangladeshi actress and beauty pageant titleholder
