= Chattogram Maa-O-Shishu Hospital Medical College =

Private medical college and hospital in Bangladesh

- CMOSHMC
- Logo of Chattagram Maa-O-Shishu Hospital Medical College
- Type: Private medical college
- Established: 2005
- Academic affiliations: Chittagong Medical University
- Principal: Ashim Kumar Barua
- Academic staff: 136
- Students: 600
- Location: Agrabad, Chattogram, Bangladesh; 22.3227°N 91.8063°E
- Campus: Urban, 4.3 acres (1.7 ha)
- Language: English
- Website: cmoshmc.edu.bd

Chattogram Maa-O-Shishu Hospital Medical College (CMOSHMC) is a private medical school in Bangladesh, established in 2005. It is located in Agrabad, Chattogram. It is affiliated with Chittagong Medical University and recognized and listed by The World Directory of Medical Schools (WDOMS), which (WDOMS) has been developed through a partnership between the World Federation for Medical Education (WFME) and FAIMER®, a division of Intealth.

It offers a five-year course of study leading to a Bachelor of Medicine, Bachelor of Surgery (MBBS) degree and the medium of Instruction is English. A one-year internship after graduation is compulsory for all graduates. The degree is recognized by the Bangladesh Medical and Dental Council.

Students and graduates of this medical school are eligible to apply to ECFMG for ECFMG Certification and for examination in the United States and medical degrees obtained from this medical school are acceptable to the provincial/territorial medical regulatory authorities in Canada. Since this college is recognized by WDOMS, the medical qualification from this college is accepted by General Medical Council (GMC), United Kingdom.

The college is associated with an 800-bed Chattogram Maa-O-Shishu General Hospital (formerly Chattogram Shishu Hospital), which established in 1979. Chattogram Maa-O-Shishu Hospital Medical College Journal is the official journal of CMOSHMC.

== History ==
Chattagram Maa-O-Shishu Hospital (CMOSH), a non-profit organisation, established CMOSHMC in 2005. Instruction began in 2006.

== Campus ==
The college is located in Agrabad, Chittagong. On the 4.3 acres (1.7 ha) campus are the college building, the associated 625-bed Chattagram Maa-Shishu O General Hospital, and a dormitory.

== Organization and administration ==
The college is affiliated with Chittagong Medical University. The college and associated hospital are run by the CMOSH executive committee.

== Academics ==
The college offers a five-year course of study, approved by the Bangladesh Medical and Dental Council (BMDC), leading to a Bachelor of Medicine, Bachelor of Surgery (MBBS) degree from Chittagong Medical University. After passing the final professional examination, there is a compulsory one-year internship. The internship is a prerequisite for obtaining registration from the BMDC to practice medicine. In October 2014, the Ministry of Health and Family Welfare capped admission and tuition fees at private medical colleges at 1,990,000 Bangladeshi taka (US$25,750 as of 2014) total for their five-year courses.

Admission for Bangladeshis to the MBBS programme at all medical colleges in Bangladesh (government and private) is conducted centrally by the Directorate General of Health Services (DGHS). It administers a written multiple choice question exam simultaneously throughout the country. Candidates are admitted based primarily on their score on this test, although grades at Secondary School Certificate (SSC) and Higher Secondary School Certificate (HSC) level also play a part. Admission for foreign students is based on their SSC and HSC grades. As of July 2014, the college is allowed to admit 90 students annually.

== Journal ==
Chattagram Maa-O-Shishu Hospital Medical College Journal, which is Index Medicus/MEDLINE listed, is the official journal of the college. It is a peer-reviewed, open access journal, published three times a year. It accepts original research articles, review articles, interesting case reports, and short communications containing significant findings. It particularly seeks to publish works by authors from Bangladesh and relevant to developing countries. Submissions should not have been published previously, and should not be submitted to multiple publications concurrently.

== See also ==
- List of medical colleges in Bangladesh
