= Jamboree Park =

Park in Chittagong, Bangladesh

- Agrabad Jamboree Park
- Bengali: জাম্বুরী পার্ক
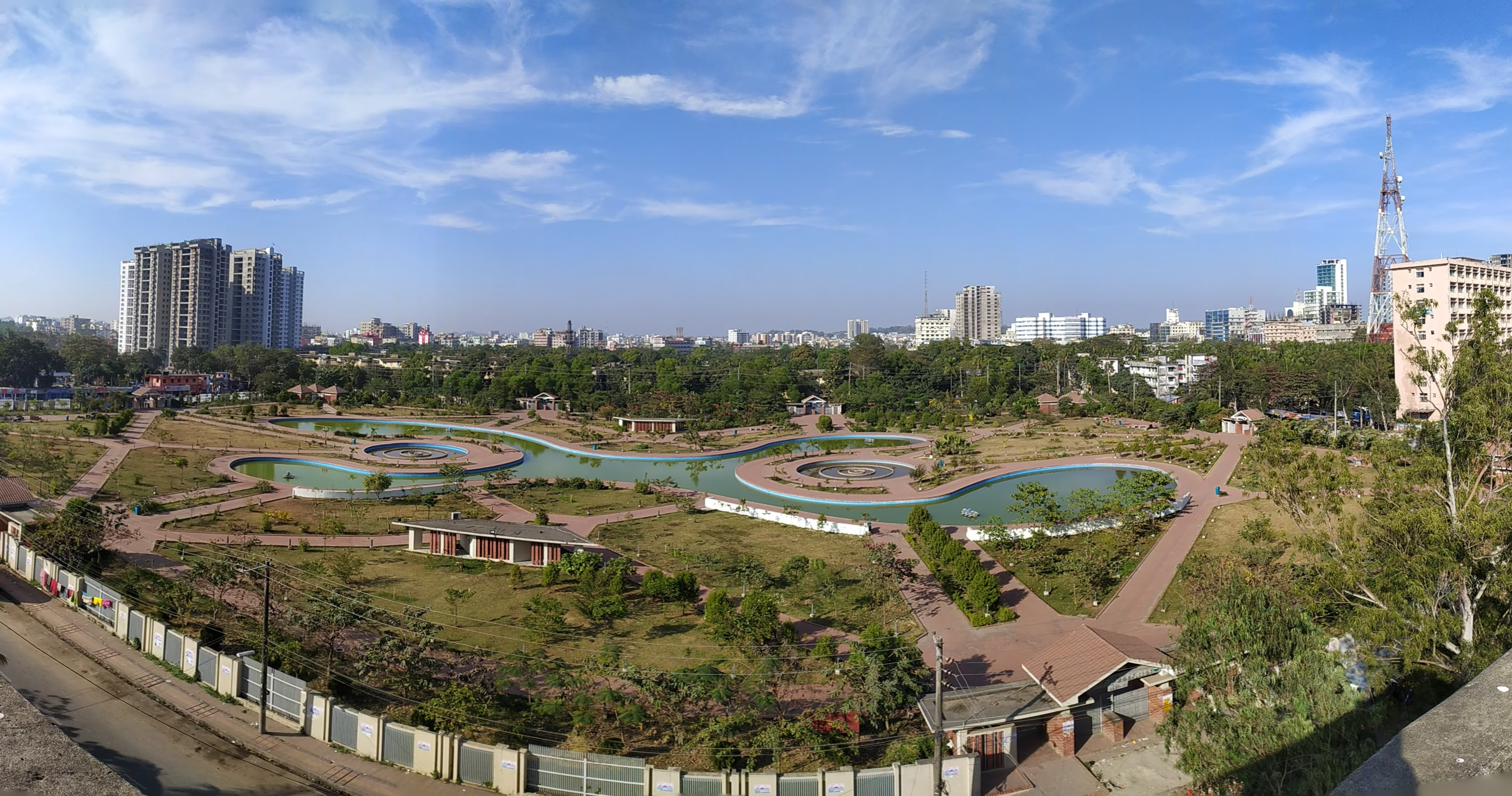
- Panoramic view of Jamboree park with Agrabad commercial area in background
- Interactive map of Jamboree Park
- Type: Urban park
- Location: Agrabad, Chittagong
- Coordinates: 22.32417°N 91.80885°E
- Area: 8.55 acres (0.0346 km^{2})
- Created: 2018
- Opening: 8 September 2018
- Owner: Ministry of Housing and Public Works
- Operator: Ministry of Housing and Public Works
- Visitors: 1000+
- Open: 17:00 to 21:00 (BST)
- Status: Open all year
- Paths: 8,000 feet (2,400 m)
- Water: 50,000 square feet (4,600 m^{2})

Jamboree Park (also spelled as Jamburi Park) is an urban park in the Agrabad area of Chittagong, Bangladesh. The park has 50,000 square feet (4,600 m^{2}) water-body alongside 8,000 feet (2,400 m) walkway and compound road, internal master drain.

== Location ==
It is located at SM Morshed Road and the most visited urban park in the port city. The park was established in 2018 on 8.55 acres (3.46 ha) of land acquired by the city.
