= National Productivity Organization =

Government agency in Bangladesh

- Formation: 1989
- Headquarters: Dhaka, Bangladesh
- Region served: Bangladesh
- Official language: Bengali
- Website: npo.gov.bd

The National Productivity Organization is an autonomous national agency responsible for the economic growth through the promotion of productivity in Bangladesh and is located in Dhaka, Bangladesh. It is under the Ministry of Industries.

== History ==
The National Productivity Organization was established in 1989 under the Ministry of Industries. It is also responsible for the implementation of the rules of the Asian Productivity Organization, which is based in Tokyo, Japan. Bangladesh joined the Asian Productivity Organization in 1982. The organisation coordinates with the National Productivity Council, the highest decision-making body on productivity.
