= Jannatul Ferdous Ivy =

Bangladeshi disability rights activist

- জান্নাতুল ফেরদৌস আইভি
- Education: National University of Bangladesh
- Occupations: film-maker, writer and disability campaigner.
- Awards: 100 Women (BBC) (2023)

Jannatul Ferdous Ivy (Bengali: জান্নাতুল ফেরদৌস আইভি) is a Bangladeshi producer, writer and disability rights activist. Ivy was named to the BBC's 100 Women list in 2023.

== Education ==
She graduated from the National University of Bangladesh in 2001 with a bachelor's degree in sociology and a master's degree in English in 2005. In 2009, she received her master's degree from the Department of Development Studies at BRAC University. She also received an LLB degree from BRAC in 2010 and a Diploma in Social Compliance from Bangladesh Institute of Management in 2012.

== Personal life ==
Ivy is a burn survivor.
