= Agrabad Mohila College =

Women's college in Chittagong, Bangladesh

Agrabad Mohila College, Chittagong
- আগ্রবাদ মহিলা কলেজ, চট্টগ্রাম
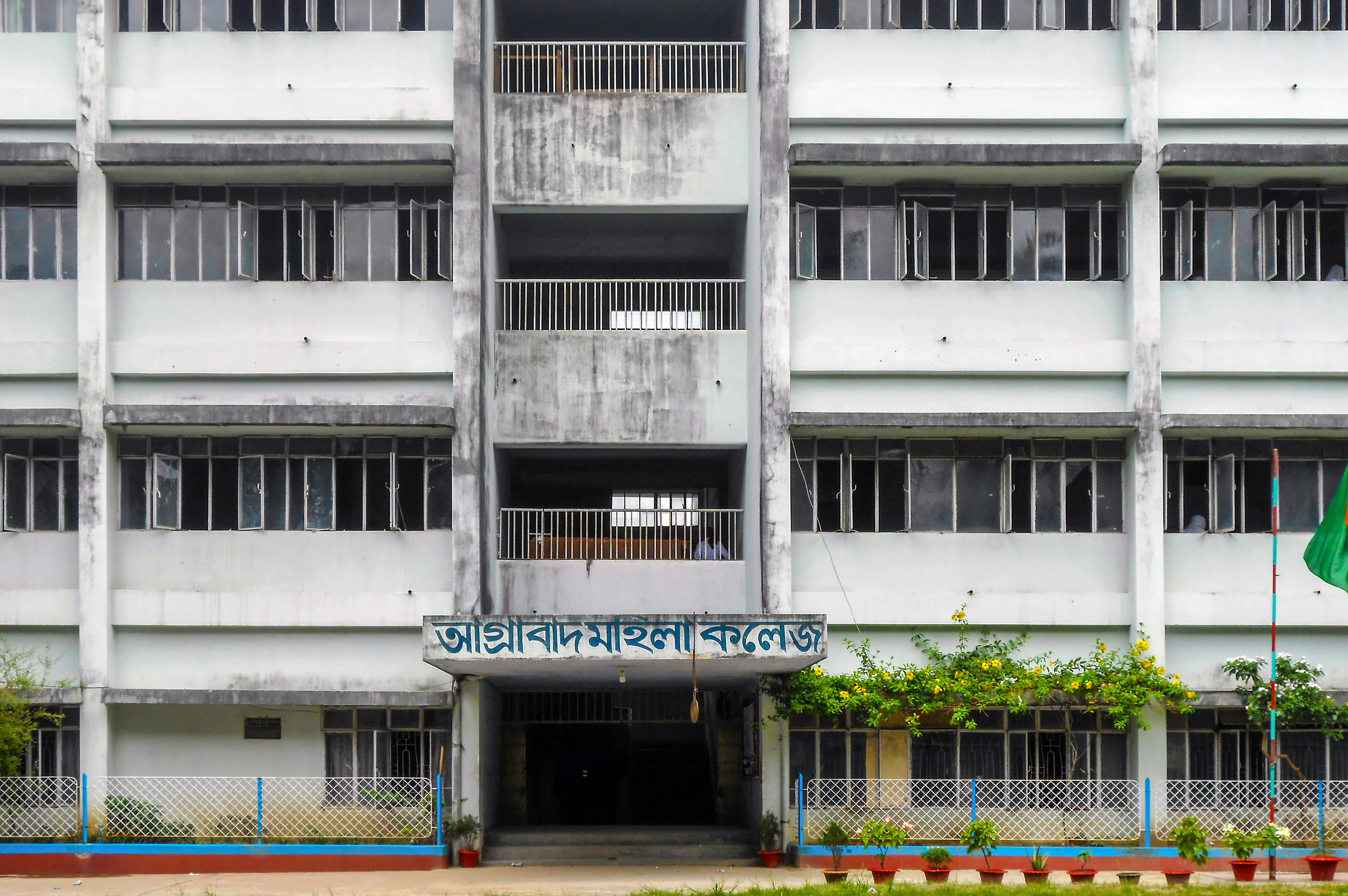
- College building
- Other names: AMC
- Motto: Education Sprouts Knowledge and Knowledge sprouts Humanity
- Type: Private
- Established: 12 February 1988
- Founders: Abu Naser
- Parent institution: Agrabad Residential Area Socio-Cultural Association
- Academic affiliations: Board of Intermediate and Secondary Education, Chattogram; National University
- Principal: Krishna Kanti Dutta
- Location: Road 17, Chittagong Development Area (CDA), Chittagong, 4000, Bangladesh; 22.3252°N 91.7976°E
- Campus: Urban
- Language: Bengali, English
- Colors: White
- Website: amc.bise-ctg.gov.bd

Agrabad Mohila College is a private women's degree college in Chittagong, Bangladesh. It has Higher Secondary School Certificate (HSC) program under Board of Intermediate and Secondary Education, and offers bachelor's degrees under the academic affiliation with National University, along with bearing EIIN number 104303.

== History ==
In 1986, to facilitate a women's college in the Double Mooring area projecting it as the pit of higher education in the southern part of the city was planned by Abu Naser, the then member of (Agrabad Residential Area Socio-Cultural Association) (ARASCA). On 12 February 1988, construction of the college has begun along with a total land of 0.1932 acres (0.0782 ha) and the foundation stone of Agrabad Mohila College was laid by L. K. Siddiqi, the then Member of the Parliament and later on the Ministry of Water Resources of people's republic of Bangladesh. M.A. Mannan, present Minister of Planning of Bangladesh, was the chief guest of the master ceremony. It was established at road no #17, Chittagong Development Authority (CDA) residential area, Agrabad, Chittagong.

Jarina Hossain, founder principal and later on chief of the project architect, made the architectural design of the college free of cost.

== Campus ==
It has an academic building located on 0.21 acres (0.085 ha) land and 0.20 acres (0.081 ha) playground within a total land of 0.60 acres (0.24 ha).

== See also ==
- List of colleges in Chittagong
