= Ethnological Museum, Chittagong =

Unique Museum in Bangladesh conserving the track of human history, culture and society

Ethnological Museum
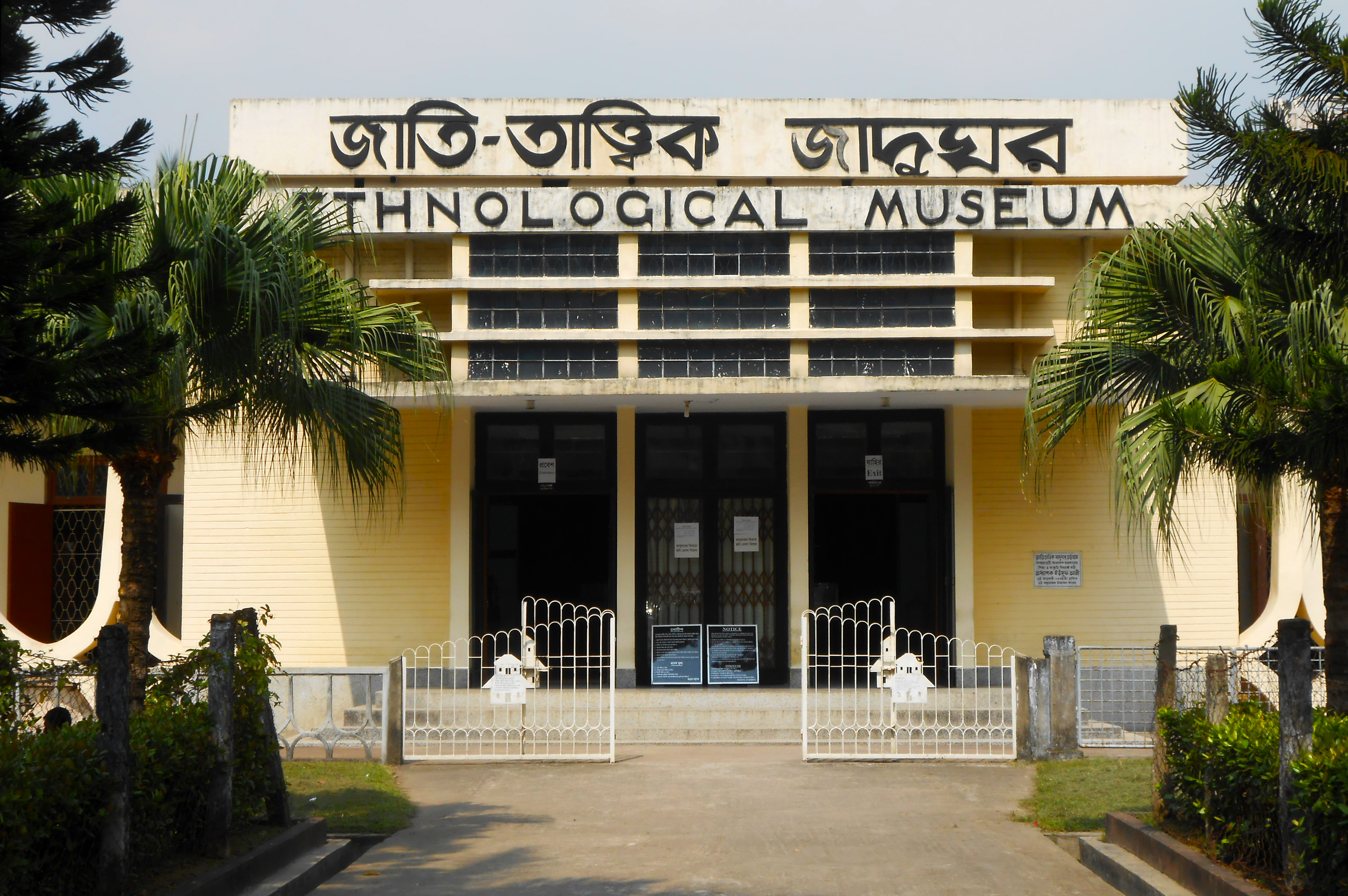
- Entrance of the Museum

- Location of Ethnological Museum of Chittagong, Bangladesh
- Established: 1965
- Location: Agrabad C/A, Chittagong, Bangladesh
- Coordinates: 22.3280°N 91.8150°E
- Type: Ethnological
- Visitors: 200-300 (per day)
- Curator: Mohammed Amiruzzaman

The Ethnological Museum of Chittagong (Bengali: জাতিতাত্ত্বিক জাদুঘর) is the only ethnological museum in Bangladesh. Located in Agrabad, Chittagong, it contains displays featuring the history of Bangladesh's tribal people.

== History ==
The museum was established in 1965 and opened to the public in 1974. Two rooms were added to the museum during 1985–1995. In 1996, a gallery with folk articles of Bengali-speaking people was added.
