= Khawja Ajmeri High School =

Khawja Ajmeri K.G & High School
- খাজা আজমেরী কে.জি & উচ্চ বিদ্যালয়
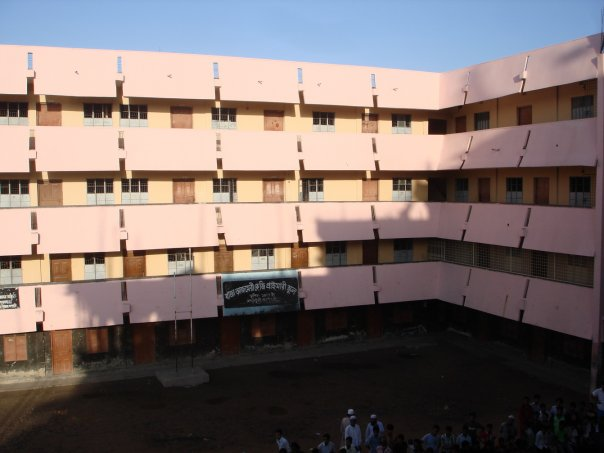

Location
- Agrabad, Chittagong, 4100; Bangladesh
- Coordinates: 22.3288°N 91.8159°E

Information
- Type: Private high school
- Established: 1974
- Status: Active
- School board: Board of Intermediate and Secondary Education, Chittagong
- Session: January – December
- School code: 104285
- Principal: Ainur Nahar
- Teaching staff: 31
- Employees: 18
- Gender: Mixed
- Enrollment: 2,800+
- Classes: 1–10
- Education system: National Curriculum and Textbook Board
- Language: Bengali English
- Classrooms: 24
- Campus: City
- Campus type: Non-residential
- Colours: Saddle brown, cream
- Slogan: "শিক্ষার ভূবনে একটি আধুনিক শিক্ষা প্রতিষ্ঠান”
- Sports: Race, high jump, long jump etc.
- Newspaper: Ajmeri Darpan

Khawja Ajmeri KG and High School (Bengali: খাজা আজমেরী কে.জি & উচ্চ বিদ্যালয়) is a private school, established in 1974 by the Khawja Ajmeri Education Society, in Agrabad, a neighbourhood of Chittagong, Bangladesh. There are two four-storeyed academic buildings, each with 24 classrooms. The school has about 2,800 students from class one to ten. It has a staff of 50 teachers and 15 clerks. The school follows the National Curriculum and Textbook Board format for education.
