= Hotel Agrabad =

Hotel in Chittagong, Bangladesh

- হোটেল আগ্রাবাদ
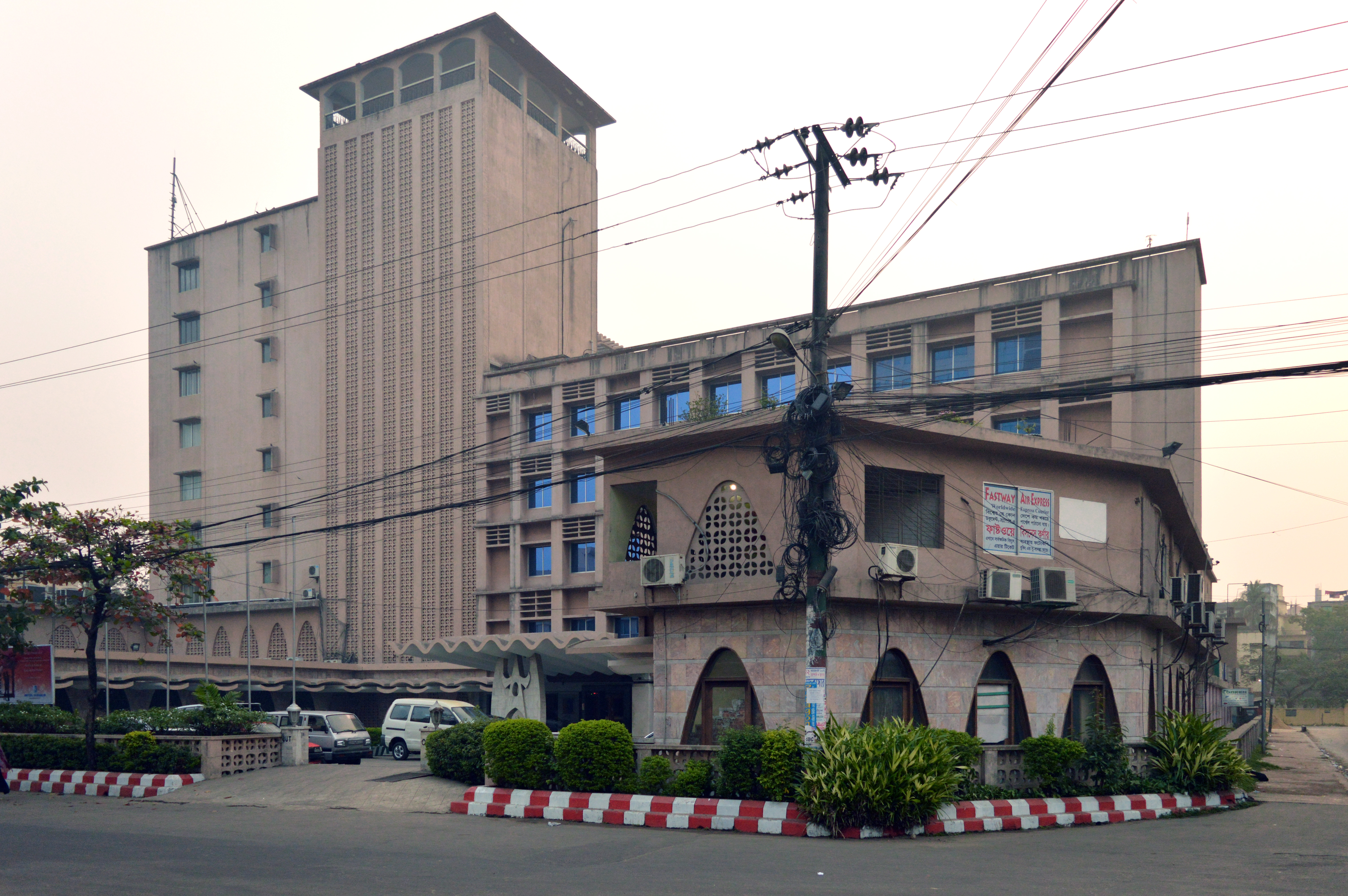
- Hotel Agrabad
- Interactive map of the Hotel Agrabad area

General information
- Status: Active
- Architectural style: Modern
- Location: Agrabad, Chittagong, Sabder Ali Road, Agrabad Commercial Area, Chittagong, Bangladesh
- Inaugurated: 1969

Height
- Roof: 5

Other information
- Number of rooms: 101
- Number of bars: 1
- Parking: yes

Website
- agrabadhotel.com/en

Hotel Agrabad is a first four-star and leading hotel located at Agrabad in Chittagong, Bangladesh.

It was established in 1969 in Sabder Ali Road named after Agrabad, a downtown commercial and financial area in the city.

== Description ==
There is a total of 101 luxurious rooms and suites, a swimming pool and bars.
