= Chittagong International Trade Fair =

Annual trade convention in Bangladesh

Chittagong International Trade Fair চট্টগ্রাম আন্তর্জাতিক বাণিজ্য মেলা
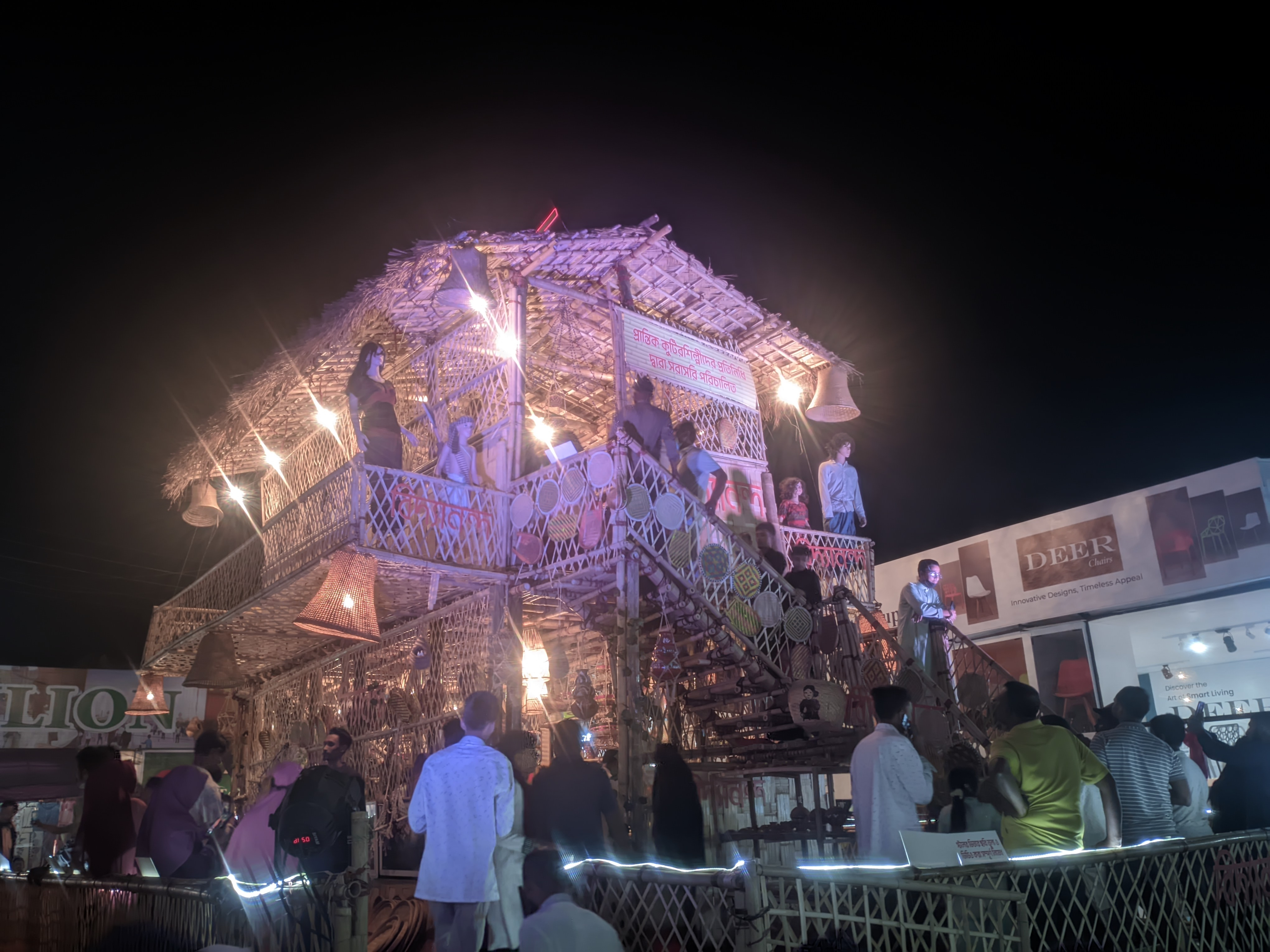
- A stall from Cottage Industry at the 2024 CITF
- Status: Active
- Genre: International Trade Fair
- Begins: First week of January
- Ends: First week of February
- Frequency: Annually
- Venue: MA Aziz Stadium; Polo Ground
- Location: Chattogram
- Coordinates: 22°20′20.1″N 91°49′05.8″E
- Country: Bangladesh
- Inaugurated: 1 December 1993
- Attendance: 2,100,000 (2018)
- Organizer: Chittagong Chamber of Commerce & Industry

The Chittagong International Trade Fair (CITF) (Bengali: চট্টগ্রাম আন্তর্জাতিক বাণিজ্য মেলা) is an international trade fair in Bangladesh. It is organized by the Chittagong Chamber of Commerce & Industry.

== Activities ==
- Exhibitions: The trade fair showcases a wide range of products and services from both local and international businesses. These can include textiles, clothing, electronics, home appliances, handicrafts, agricultural products, automobiles, and more.
- Cultural Displays: The fair often includes cultural displays that highlight the artistic and traditional aspects of the region. These displays can feature local crafts, traditional performances, and cultural events that provide visitors with a glimpse into the local culture.
