= Department of Patents, Designs and Trademarks =

- পেটেন্ট, শিল্প-নকশা ও ট্রেডমার্কস অধিদপ্তর

Agency overview
- Formed: 2003
- Jurisdiction: Government of Bangladesh
- Headquarters: Dhaka, Bangladesh
- Parent department: Ministry of Industries
- Website: dpdt.gov.bd

The Department of Patents, Designs and Trademarks is the main government department responsible for patents and trademarks in Bangladesh. It is located in Dhaka, Bangladesh.

== History ==
On 11 May 1985, the Government of Bangladesh joined the World Intellectual Property Organization and in February 1999 joined the Paris Convention for the Protection of Industrial Property. In 1989, the Patent Office and the Trademarks Registry were joined. In 2003, the Department of Patents, Designs and Trademarks (DPDT) was established in its present form by the Ministry of Industry. It approves geographical indication for products in Bangladesh. In 2018, the DPDT, Ministry of Industries, Government of Bangladesh approved the regulations for using the 'collective mark' of Centre for Policy Research, Bangladesh. It has experienced difficulty coordinating efforts with the Bangladesh Copyright Office.
