= Office of The Chief Inspector of Boilers =

- Formation: 1972
- Headquarters: Dhaka, Bangladesh
- Region served: Bangladesh
- Official language: Bengali
- Website: www.boiler.gov.bd

The Office of The Chief Inspector of Boilers (Bengali: প্রধান বয়লার পরিদর্শকের কার্যালয়) is a Bangladesh government regulatory agency that is responsible for inspection of commercial boilers in factories in Bangladesh. Mohammad Abdul Mannan has been Chief Inspector Of Boilers since 2015.

== History ==
The office of The Chief Inspector of Boilers traces its origin to a boiler safely act created in 1923 during the British colonial rule. In 1924, the first boiler inspection department was established in Kolkata. After the Partition of India in 1947, a new inspection department was created for Pakistan in 1961. After the Independence of Bangladesh in 1971, this department became the Office of The Chief Inspector of Boilers. In 2017, six inspectors under the office were responsible for inspecting 5,000 boilers in Bangladesh. It is under the Ministry of Industries, but the Ministry of Labour and Employment (Bangladesh) wants the department to be moved under its Department of Inspection for Factories and Establishments.
