= Bangladesh Industrial Technical Assistance Center =

Research institute in Bangladesh

- Formation: 1972
- Headquarters: Dhaka, Bangladesh
- Region served: Bangladesh
- Official language: Bengali
- Website: www.bitac.gov.bd

The Bangladesh Industrial Technical Assistance Center is an autonomous government body and research center that researches ways to improve industrial production and provide technical knowledge and is located in Dhaka, Bangladesh. It is part of a Bangladesh government strategy to support small middle enterprise.

== History ==
The Bangladesh Industrial Technical Assistance Center traces its origins to the Pakistan Industrial Technical Centre which was established through the merger of IRDC & PIPS in 1962. After the Independence of Bangladesh it was changed to Bangladesh Industrial Technical Assistance Center.
