= Chittagong Chamber of Commerce & Industry =

Bangladeshi non-profit organization

The Chittagong Chamber of Commerce & Industry (CCCI)
- চট্টগ্রাম শিল্প ও বণিক সমিতি
- Founded: 1906
- Type: Non-profit organization
- Legal status: Association
- Purpose: Business
- Location: Chittagong, Bangladesh
- Coordinates: 22.318611°N 91.784167°E
- Origins: Chittagong
- Region served: Bangladesh
- Services: Charitable services for business
- Key people: Mohammed Amirul Haque (President)
- Website: chittagongchamber.com

The Chittagong Chamber of Commerce & Industry (CCCI) is an industry-led and industry-managed organization which represents the business and corporate sector in Chittagong, Bangladesh. The organization acts as a major advocate promoting the strategic economic development of Chittagong as the nation's business capital and a regional economic hub. Mohammad Nurullah Noori is the head of the organization since 2025. In 2016 the chamber called for increasing the tax exemption income level for women.

It is based in the Agrabad district. This organization play important role for economic growth.

== See also ==
- FBCCI
- Chittagong International Trade Fair
