= Eastern Bank Ltd (historic) =

Eastern Bank Limited
- Industry: financial service activities, except insurance and pension funding
- Founded: 1909
- Defunct: 1971
- Fate: Acquired by Chartered Bank (1957); Amalgamated into Standard Chartered (1971)
- Successor: Standard Chartered (1971)
- Headquarters: London, United Kingdom

The Eastern Bank Limited was a British bank founded in 1909 in London to help finance trade with the Far East. In 1957 Chartered Bank (now Standard Chartered Bank) acquired Eastern, and eventually absorbed it into Standard Chartered in 1971.

== History ==
=== Early years: 1909–1945 ===
Eastern Bank Limited was founded in 1909 in London as a new Eastern exchange bank to help finance trade with the Far East. The next year Eastern established branches in Bombay and Calcutta. Right from its inception, the bank had a number of powerful institutional shareholders, including the Sassoon family.

Eastern expanded into the Ottoman province of Mesopotamia (now Iraq), opening a Baghdad branch in 1912. The province had promises of a lucrative oil exploration concession, being actively pursued by a consortium named Turkish Petroleum Company (TPC), now Iraq Petroleum Company (IPC), which included Anglo-Persian Oil Company (now BP), Royal Dutch Shell, and Deutsche Bank. Eastern Bank had to close its Baghdad branch at the start of the First World War due to the alliance from the Ottoman Empire and German Empire, and competition from other banks that included Deutsche Bank and the National Bank of Turkey. However, Eastern reopened its Baghdad branch within a year and opened branches in Basra (1915) and Amarah (1916) in the wake of the British invasion of Iraq. With the establishment of a British Mandate over Iraq, the bank expanded further into Mosul (1919) and Kirkuk (1926).

Eastern also expanded to other British possessions east of Suez, namely Colombo, Ceylon (1920), Madras (1922), Karachi (1923), and Singapore (1928). British banks also expanded into the small sheikhdoms in the Persian Gulf, British protectorates which were short of modern financial institutions. Eastern opened a branch in Bahrain in 1920 to leverage the close trading links between the island and Bombay, a key stronghold of Eastern bank. Until 1944, Eastern remained the island's only bank. By the late 1930s, profits rose because of the booming oil industry in the Arab sheikhdoms. However, Eastern could not expand further in the region as the Imperial Bank of Iran held near monopoly agreements during the 1940s with the rulers of several important sheikhdoms, especially Kuwait.

During the 1930s and 1940s, Barclays Bank (DCO) started acquiring stake in Eastern Bank and in 1939 the chairman of Barclays (DCO) joined the board of Eastern Bank.

=== Post–World War: 1945–1957 ===
After the Second World War, Eastern opened branches in Penang, Malaysia (1947, closed 1958), with a sub-branch at Butterworth (1948, closed 1957); Kuala Lumpur (1948); Chittagong, East Pakistan, now Bangladesh (1948, closed 1958); and Cochin, India (1953, closed 1958). It also opened branches at Doha, Qatar (1950); Aden, Yemen (1951), with a sub-branch at Steamer Point (1953, closed 1958); Mukalla, Yemen (1955); and Beirut, Syria (1956).

Barclays Bank DCO increased its stake as a strategic initiative to tap into its Arab customers via Eastern Bank, as Barclays had a strong Jewish customer base in Palestine. By 1957, Barclays Bank DCO and the Sassoon family in total held a controlling 65% of the capital of the bank.

=== Amalgamation into Standard Chartered: 1957–1971 ===
In 1957, the Mundhra Scandal inflicted heavy losses on Eastern Bank's Bombay and Calcutta branches. The same year, Barclays DCO and the Sassoon family sold their controlling interest in the bank to Chartered Bank, an Eastern Bank rival. At that time, Chartered Bank faced the challenges of a post-colonial world with new national government policies in China, India, Burma and Ceylon, and saw Eastern Bank as a strategic acquisition. The bank remained a wholly owned subsidiary of Chartered Bank, with some level of autonomy.

The political changes in several Arab countries during the 1960s led to nationalisation of branches in Iraq, Aden, Mukalla, and Sheikh Othman, and these events greatly affected Eastern. During the same time, it opened branches in Sharjah (1958); Abu Dhabi (1961); Al Ain, Buraimi, Abu Dhabi (1962); Seiyun, Yemen (1962); and Bowbazar in Calcutta (1969).

In 1969, Chartered Bank merged with the South African bank Standard Bank, forming Standard Chartered Bank. In 1971, Standard Chartered absorbed Eastern's operations, and the name "Eastern Bank Ltd" slowly disappeared.
