= Bangladesh Institute of Management =

Research institute in Bangladesh

Coordinates: 23.757°N 90.376°E

Bangladesh Institute of Management (BIM)
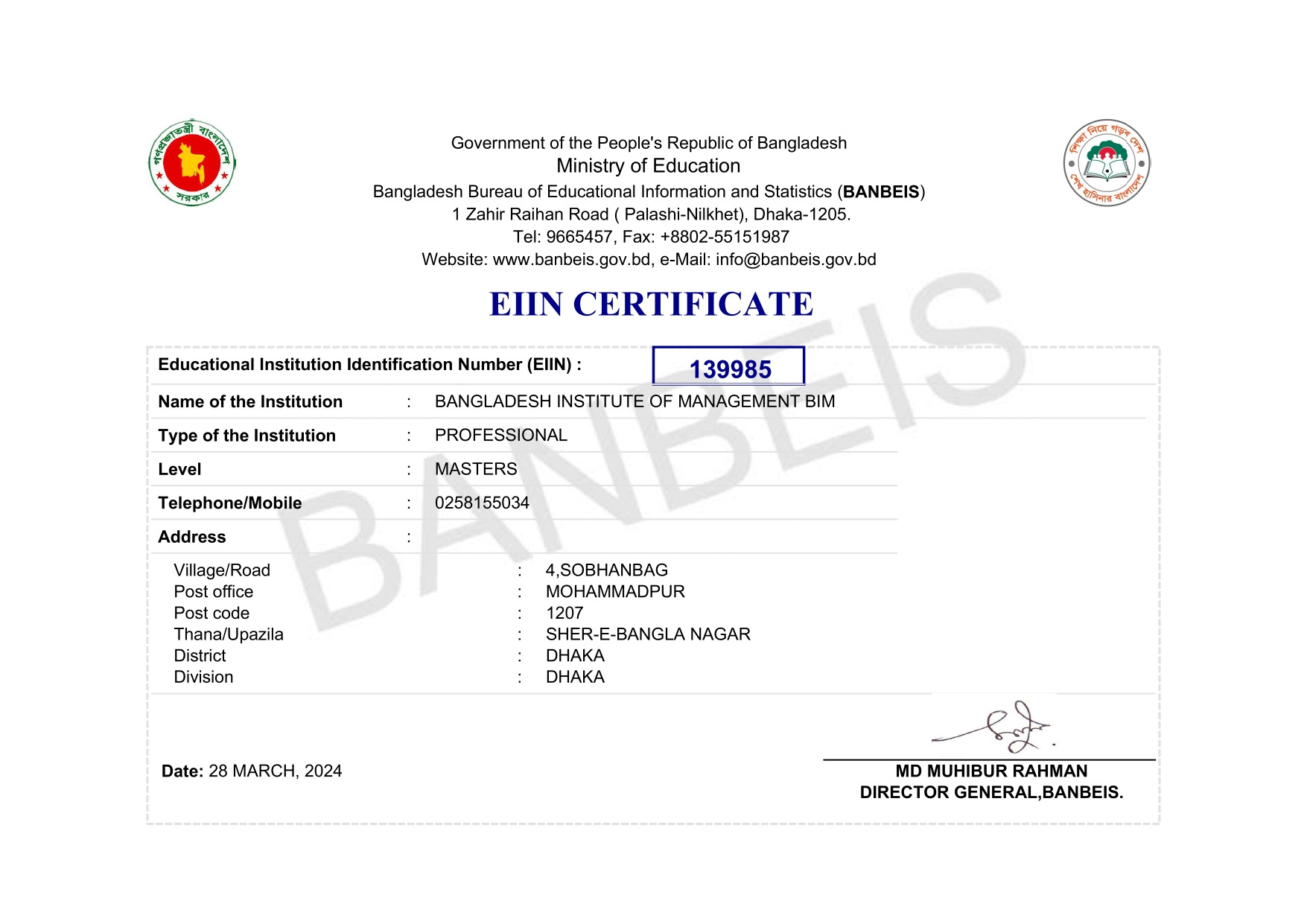
- Established: 1961
- Staff: 200
- Location: Dhaka, Chattogram and Khulna, Bangladesh
- Website: www.bim.gov.bd

The Bangladesh Institute of Management (BIM) is a management Institute and the first deemed professional public university of Bangladesh by Act 54 of 2023, established in 1961. Its headquarters is located at 4 Sobhanbag, Mirpur Road, Dhaka. Other campuses are located in Chattogram and Khulna.

== Departments/Divisions ==
=== List of academic departments/divisions ===
- Financial Management Division
- Production Management Division
- Productivity and Consultancy Services Division
- Project and Social Services Division
- Computer Services Division
- General Management Division
- Marketing Management Division
- Human Resources Management Division
- Research, Evaluation and Publication Division
- TOT and Behavioral Management Division

== Campuses ==
=== List of campuses ===
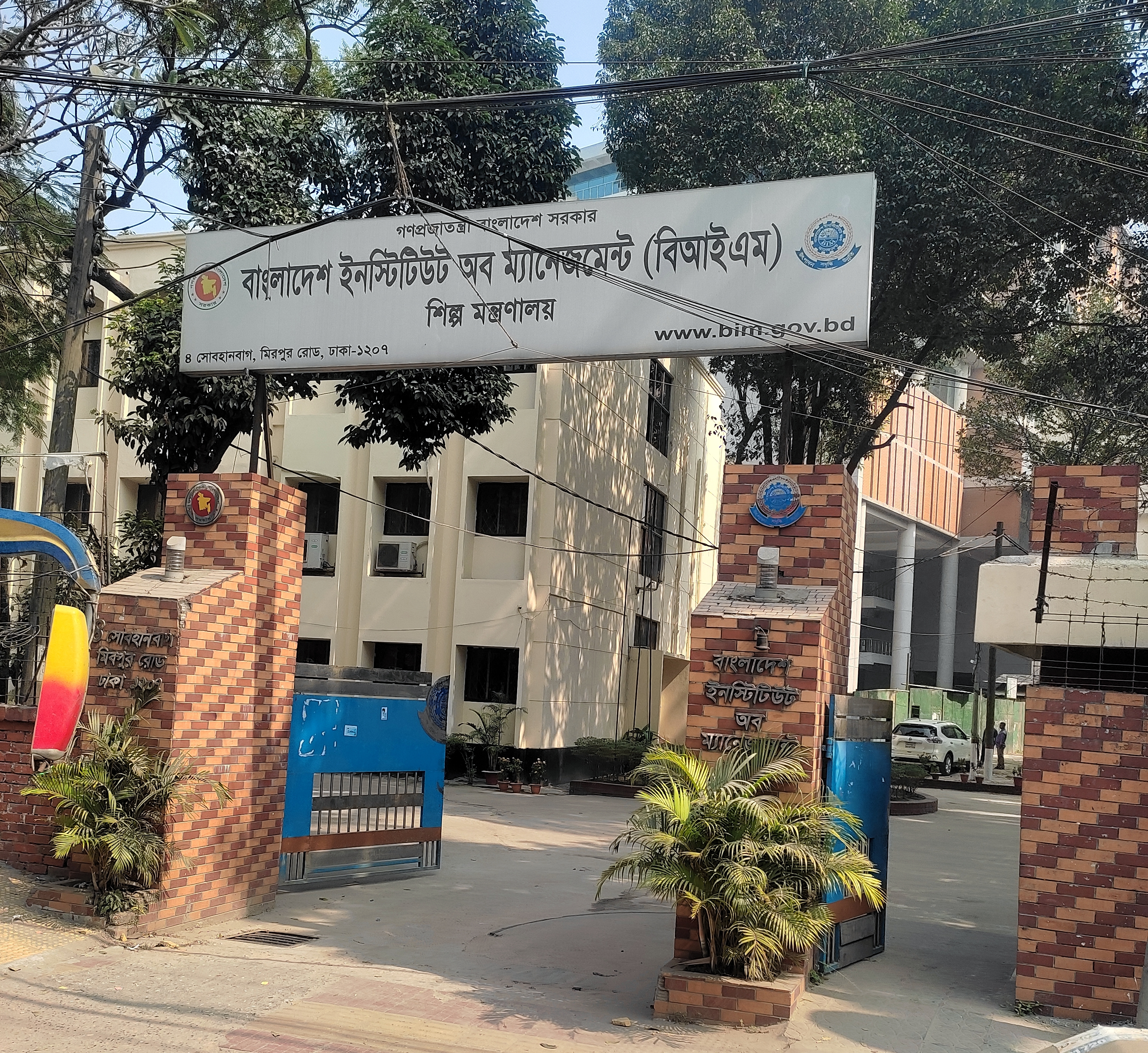
Bangladesh Institute of Management (BIM), Dhaka

- Dhaka
- Chittagong
- Khulna
- Proposed project for campus all divisional city

== Professional academic post-graduate courses ==
The institute offers the following academic courses:

- Post Graduate Diploma in Human Resource Management (PGDHRM)
- Post Graduate Diploma in Industrial Management (PGDIM)
- Post Graduate Diploma in Financial Management (PGDFM)
- Post Graduate Diploma in Marketing Management (PGDMM)
- Post Graduate Diploma in Computer Science (PGDCS)
- Post Graduate Diploma in Supply Chain Management (PGDSCM)
- Diploma in Social Compliance (DSC)
- Diploma in Productivity and Quality Management (DPQM)
- Advanced Certificate course on Business Administration( ACBA)

== Proposed professional academic post-graduate courses ==
- Post Graduate Diploma in Supply Chain Management
- Post Graduate Diploma in Project Management
- Post Graduate Diploma in Industrial Engineering and Management
- Post Graduate Diploma in Integrated Management System
- Post Graduate Diploma in Safety Management
- Diploma in Total Quality Management
- Diploma in Technology Management
- Diploma in Tax Compliance

== Professional training courses ==
The institute offers the following training courses:

- Project Management
- Supply Chain Management
- Total Quality Management
- Productivity and Competitiveness
- Productivity Improvement Techniques
- Public Procurement Management
- Critical Path Method using MS Project
- Project Financial management
- Industrial Safety Management
- Quality Management System (ISO 9001:2015)
- Integrated Management System
- Technology based Human Resource Management
- Occupational Health Safety and Productivity
- Labor Law
- Financial Management
- Human Resource Management
- Information Technology in Business and Management
- MIS

== Partnerships and alliances ==
The institute has partnerships and alliances with the following universities

- Daffodil International University, Dhaka, Bangladesh
- Universiapolis – International University of Agadir, Morocco
- IEOM Society
- BIM IEOM Society Student Chapter
- BIM Act, 1961
- 9 Aug 2025 RUET Joint programs, HR development
- 17 Aug 2025 Pabna University of Science & Technology Training & research collaboration
- 28 Aug 2025 DUET Academic & research cooperation
- 28 Aug 2025 Jagannath University Academic & training collaboration
- 30 Aug 2025 BUET Higher education & research partnership
- TTTCs
- NPO
- BIM act 2023
- IEOM Student Chapter
