= Bangladesh Accreditation Board =

Research institute in Bangladesh

- Formation: 2006
- Headquarters: Dhaka, Bangladesh
- Region served: Bangladesh
- Official language: Bengali
- Website: bab.portal.gov.bd

The Bangladesh Accreditation Board is an autonomous government agency responsible for providing accreditations to Bangladeshi laboratories, testing centres, and certification bodies. It is located in Dhaka, Bangladesh.

== History ==
The Bangladesh Accreditation Board was established on 6 September 2006 by the government of Bangladesh through an act of parliament. The United Nations Industrial Development Organization hired a French-Canadian consultant, Ned Gravel, to improve the practices in the board and this was done under a project funded by the European Union. In 2015 the board signed an agreement with the Thai Industrial Standard Institute to improve trade ties between Bangladesh and Thailand. The chairman of Western Marine alleged that the accreditation issued by the board is sometimes not accepted in other countries.
