= List of schools in Bangladesh =

This is a list of schools in Bangladesh. The syllabus most common in usage is the National Curriculum and Textbooks, which has two versions, a Bengali version and an English version. Edexcel and Cambridge syllabus are used for most of the English-medium schools. Other syllabi are also used, although rarely.

== Comilla District ==
Name	Location	Established
Bakhrabad Gas Adarsha Bidhalaya		1995
Bibir Bazar High School		1946
Comilla Cantonment High School		
Comilla High School		1947
Comilla Modern High School		1993
Comilla Zilla School		1837
Ibn Taimiya School and College	EPZ Road, Tomsom Bridge	1979
Ispahani Public School & College	Comilla Cantonment	1963
Laksam Pilot High School		1900
Nawab Faizunnessa Government Girls' High School		1873
Oxford International School & College, Chandina		
Oxford International School & College, Debidwar		

== Dhaka Division ==
Name	Location	Syllabus & Medium	Est.	Levels	Admission Period
Dhaka Residential Model College	Mirpur Road, Mohammadpur, Dhaka-1207	Ministry of Education Board of Intermediate and Secondary Education, Dhaka; Directorate of Primary Education	1960	From III-XII	Admission to Classes 11 and 12 is conducted through the national admission website. For admission to Classes 3, 6, and 9, an admission test is held.
RAJUK Uttara Model College	RAJUK College Road, Sector 6 Uttara, Dhaka 1230	Prescribed By Dhaka Education Board	1994	From VI-XII	
Stride International School	Uttara sector 7, Road 27, house 16	Edexcel Curriculum	2014	Nursery to A Level (3 yrs to 18 yrs)	May to July and November to January
E & H School	JTL Point, Holding I/2, Block D, Road 1A, Shagufta New road, Mirpur 12, Mirpur, Bangladesh	Cambridge Curriculum	2024	Nursery to A Level (3 yrs to 18 yrs)	June to July and December to January
LORDS-An English Medium School, Dhaka	House-45/A, Road-116, Gulshan 1, Dhaka, Bangladesh	Edexcel curriculum	2016	Playgroup to A'level	July–June
BAF Shaheen College Dhaka	Jahangir Gate, Dhaka Cantonment, Dhaka- 1206	Prescribed By Dhaka Education Board	1960	From KG-XII	
BAF Shaheen College Kurmitola	Kurmitola, Dhaka Cantonment, Dhaka - 1206	NCTB; Bengali and English version	1972	KG to XII	
Sydney International School	House # 08, Road # 09, Block # J, Baridhara, Dhaka	BOSTES curriculum and Cambridge curriculum for O'level and A'level	2011	Preschool to A'level	
Pledge Harbour International School	Singer Dighi, Maona, Sreepur, Gazipur-1741	Cambridge and IB curriculum		Playgroup to A'level	
BAF Shaheen English Medium College	Jahangir Gate, Dhaka Cantonment, Dhaka-1206	Cambridge curriculum	1992	Playgroup to O'level	
Yale International School	House: 41, Road: 04, Sector: 03, Uttara Model Town, Dhaka-1230	Cambridge and Edexcel curriculum	2000	Playgroup to A'level	December–January
Sir John Wilson School	Main Campus (KGII to A'Level): United City, Satarkul, Dhaka-1229 Early Section (PG-KGI): House-5, Road-77, Gulshan, Dhaka-1212	Edexcel syllabus	1995	Playgroup to A'level	June–July
French International School of Dhaka	Embassy Road, Plot 13, Baridhara, Dhaka-1212	French and English. French official program from preschool to high school.	1987	Pre-Kindergarten Through Grade 12	
Rajdharpur Madhyamik Bidyalay	Rajdharpur Bazaar, Baliakandi, Rajbari 7730	Prescribed By Dhaka Education Board	1972	From VI-X	
Australian International School	(300 Feet, Purbachal Road) Joarshahara, Khilkhet, Dhaka-1229	IB curriculum	2002	Playgroup to Year 12	
Angelica International School	B-83/1, Bazar Road, Savar, Dhaka-1340	Edexcel syllabus	1997	Playgroup to A'level	
Prime Bank English Medium School	Uttara branch: House-11, Road-20/C, Sector-4, Uttara, Dhaka-1230 Mirpur Branch: House-05, Avenue 2, Block-A, Section-11, Mirpur, Dhaka-1216		2008	Playgroup to A'level	
Stride International School	Uttara Sector 7, Road 27, house 16	NCTB-English	2019	Nursery to Class 5	May to July and October to January
Shaheed Ramiz Uddin Cantonment School	Adjacent to Dhaka Cantonment MES Flyover, Dhaka Cantonment, Dhaka-1206	Dhaka Education Board	1939	Playgroup to SSC	
Creative International School	Sonir Akhra, Demra, Dhaka-1361	Bangla Medium	2008	Playgroup to Class 8	
Rangon Academy	Main Campus : House # 30, Road # 11, Sector# 10, Uttara, Dhaka 1230 Kamarpara Campus: MAMS school, kamarpara, Turag Dhaka; Contact Number: 01717227678, 01825788969	Dhaka University Fine Arts Syllabus Drawing, Music, Dance, Guitar, Hand Writing, Violin, Acting, flute, Recitation, Music instruments	2012	Rangon Junior- J.S.C	December–January
Mirpur International Tutorial	Mirpur-2, Road# 2, House #16, sec#2 Block#D Mirpur Dhaka-1216.	English Medium International School.	2003		July–June, January–December
South Point School and College	Dhaka	English and Bangla version, English and Bangla medium	2002	Play group to secondary levels (college)	December- January
St Gregory's School	82, Municipal Road, Luxmibazar, Dhaka-1100	Bangla Medium and English Version	1882	Nursery to Class 12	January
Mohammadpur Preparatory School & College.	3/3, Asad Avenue, Mohammadpur, Dhaka	Bangla and English Medium School	1976		January
Queen's School & College	School Campus: 18, Adorsha Chayanir Housing, Ring Road, Adabor, Dhaka-1207 College Campus: 1132/C, Baitul Aman Housing Society, Adabor, Dhaka-1207	Bangla medium and English version		Playgroup to Class 10	
A. K. High School and College	Dania(near Jatrabari), Kadamtali, Dhaka-1236	NCTB – Bengali	1971	1st – 12th grade	January
Kids Tutorial	7/A Circuit House Rd, Ramna, Shantinagar, Dhaka- 1000	Edexcel syllabus	1987	Playgroup to O'level	June–July, November–December
Green Bud School	63/2 Purana Paltan Line, Dhaka- 1000	NCTB syllabus	2001	Playgroup to Class 5	December–January
Mangrove School	7/8, Block-D, Lalmatia, Dhaka-1207	Edexcel syllabus		Playgroup to A-Level	
Academia School	Main Campus: House-6/10, Block-F, Satmasjid Road, Lalmatia, Dhaka-1207 Dhanmondi Campus: House-33, Road-9/A, Dhanmondi R/A, Dhaka–1209 Mirpur Campus: House–28, Road–2, Block–B, Mirpur Housing Estate, Mirpur–12, Dhaka – 1216 Uttara Campus: House–88, Gausul Azam Avenue, Sector – 13, Uttara, Dhaka–1230 Gulshan Campus House – 23, 113 Bir Uttam H.M.A Gaffar Road, Gulshan, Dhaka-1212	Edexcel syllabus	2002	Playgroup to A-Level	June–July
Adroit International School	2/7, Block-F, Lalmatia, Dhaka 1207	Edexcel and Cambridge syllabus	2000	Playgroup to A-Level	December–January and June–July
Japanese School Dhaka	Plot No. 9, Block-H, Pragati Sharani Road, Baridhara, Dhaka-1212				
St. Peters School of London	Dhanmondi Branch:Road# 7A, House # 74/A Dhanmondi, Dhaka-1209;Uttara Branch: House # 22, Sector#13(Opposite of Agora)Uttara, Dhaka-1230	English Medium International School.	2012		July–June
Vision Global School	House-17, Road-10, Gulshan-1, Dhaka-1212	Syllabus Edexcel	2010	Levels Playgroup to A" Level	Admission period June -Julv
Regent College, Dhaka	House 23, Road 113, Gulshan – 2, Dhaka-1212	English Medium International College for A Level.	2011	CIE A' Level	July–June
International Turkish Hope School, Dhaka	Plot-7, Road-6, Sector-4 Uttara, Dhaka-1230	IGCSE	1996	Playgroup to A'level	July–June
Kakali High School, Dhaka	House 79, Satmasjid Road, Dhanmondi, Dhaka	NCTB	1971	Nursery to Class 10	December–January
IBQ – Institute for British Qualifications	Address :Savar	English Medium International School and Coaching from Playgroup to A Level. O' and A' Level syllabus is IGCSE and GCE under Edexcel curriculum. It is considered to be the best in the field.	2009	Play Group to A' Level	July–June, January- December
Morning Glory School (MGS)	Address : Savar		1999	Nursery to Std-X	January
British International Kids School (BIKS)	13/b Tikatuly, Dhaka-1203	Bengali & English Medium and Version	2004		January & June
Averroes International School Mirpur	Head Office: 7/1, Pallabi, Section-12, Mirpur-12, Dhaka-1216 (Westside of Mirpur 12 Bus Stand)	Edexcel	2017	Playgroup to A'level	July-June
Lakehead Grammar School	Gulshan Branch: House-SEB-6, Road-134, Gulshan-1, Dhaka-1212 Dhanmondi Branch: House-78, Road-11/A, Dhaka-1209	Cambridge curriculum		Playgroup to A'level	
Methodist English Medium School	250/1, 2nd Colony Mazar Road, Mirpur-1, Dhaka-1218	Edexcel syllabus	1998	Playgroup to A'level	
A. G. Church School Dhaka	House-401/1, New Eskaton Road, Dhaka	English and Bangla Medium		Playgroup to A'level	
ABC International School	75, North Chashara, Narayanganj-1400	Edexcel syllabus			
Alfred International School and College	616-617, Dania Main Road, Kadamtoli, Dhaka-1236	Edexcel syllabus for English medium and English version also available	2007	Playgroup to A'level	
JAAGO Foundation	86/1B, Sadek Khan Road, Rayer Bazar, Dhaka – 1209	Edexcel	2007	Play Group – O' Level	July–June
Dhamrai Hardinge High School and College	Dhamrai, Dhaka 1350	NCTB	1914	Class 6 to HSC	January
Daffodil International School	Permanent Campus: House-71, Road-9/A, Dhanmondi, Dhaka-1209 Uttara Branch: House-3, Shonargaon Janapath, Sector-12, Uttara Model Town, Uttara, Dhaka-1230	Edexcel curriculum	2009	Playgroup to A Level	July–June
Green Leaf International School (GLIS)	Rickshaw Stand 248, Donia, Dhaka	GLIS Syllabus	N/A	Preschool – STD III	January- December
Mirpur Govt. High School	Mirpur-1, Bus Stand attached, Mirpur, Section-01, Dhaka-1216	NCTB	1963	Class 1 to SSC	January–December
Arcadia International School & College (AISCO)	2163 Rokeya villa, Madinabag, Rayerbag, Kadomtoly, Dhaka 1236	Edexcel	2006	Play Group to A' Level	January–December
Islami Bank International School & College	225 Senpara Parbata, Mirpur, Dhaka-1216	Edexcel	1999	Play Group to O' Level	January–December
Cardiff International School Dhaka (CISD)	Senior Section: House # 60/A, Road # 27 (old), 16 (new), Junior Section: House: 2/9, Block- D, Lalmatia, Dhaka-1207	English Medium International School from Playgroup to A Level following the preschool curriculum of IPC (USA), Primary curriculum of IPC (UK) and CIPP, CGE O and A Level curricula of University Cambridge International Examinations (CIE), uk.	2013	Play Group to A' Level	July–June
Barnamala Adarsha High School & College	Shonir Akhra, Jatrabari, Dhaka-1236	Prescribed By Dhaka Education Board	1979	1-12	January
Bangladesh Web School	Bangladesh		2013	Web Related Subject	Jan-Dec
Civil Aviation High School	Kawola, Kurmitola, Dhaka 1229	Bengali Medium	1978	Kindergarten to Class 10	January and February
Scholastica	Uttara, Mirpur, Gulshan & Dhanmondi Dhaka	Syllabus Cambridge	1977	Playgroup- A Level	June
Green Dale International School, Dhaka	Senior Campus: House#8, Road#83 Junior Campus 1: House#, Gulshan North Avenue; Junior Campus 2: House#3, Road#84, Gulshan-2, Dhaka-1212	Cambridge Syllabus	1990	Playgroup- A Level	June
Singapore International School	Sector #7, Road #26, House #34, Uttara, Dhaka-1230	Syllabus Cambridge	2005	Playgroup- A Level	June
Canadian Trillinium School	House 7 Road 62, Gulshan-2, Dhaka-1212	Canadian Curriculum	2011	Pre-Kindergarten – Grade 12	
Begum Sufia Model High School	Srifoltoli, Kaliakoir.	NCTB	1965		
Cordova Int'l School & College	House #29, Road #4, Block – C, Banasree, Rampura	Edexcel	2002	Playgroup – A Level	October; April
Aga Khan School	Primary section: Road-9, Sector-4, Uttara, Dhaka-1230 Junior section: Road-6, Sector-4, Uttara, Dhaka-1230 Senior section: Road-6/1, Sector-4, Uttara, Dhaka-1230	Cambridge International Examinations syllabus	1988	Playgroup – A Level	October–November
Royal School Dhaka	Adjacent to Apollo Hospital, Beside DBBL, Basundhara R/A, Dhaka-1212	Cambridge curriculum	2016	Playgroup to O'level	January
Ganobhaban Government High School			1980		
M.D.C. Model Institute	12-B, Pallabi, Dhaka – 1216	NCTB	1978	1st – 10th grade	January
Monipur High School	Monipur, Mirpur – 2, Dhaka – 1216	NCTB	1969	1st – 10th grade	January
Saint Joseph Higher Secondary School	97, Asad Avenue, Mohammadpur, Dhaka	NCTB	1954	3rd – 12th grade	January
East-West International School & College	265/1, West Shewrapara, Mirpur, Dhaka-1216	Edexcel syllabus	1995	Playgroup to A'level	June–July
Sristy Central School & College Dhaka	Uttara, Dhaka – 1230	NCTB: Bengali	2005	Playgroup – College	January
K. L. Jubilee High School & College	39, Northbrok hall road, Banglabazar, Dhaka-1100	NCTB	1866	Class 1 to Class 10	
Kallyanpur Girls' School & College	Kallyanpur, Mirpur, Dhaka-1207	Bangla Medium	1972		
Nawab Habibullah Model School & College	Shahjalal Avenue, Sector- 04, Uttara Model Town, Dhaka-1230	NCTB	1963		
Joy Govinda High School, Narayanganj	Narayanganj – 1400	NCTB: Bengali		Play Group to SSC Level	January
Gonobidya Niketon High School, Narayanganj	Narayanganj Port, Vulta – 1400	NCTB: Bengali	1974	Play Group to S.S.C. Level	January
Morgan Gils High School, Narayanganj	Narayanganj – 1400	NCTB: Bengali		Play Group to S.S.C. Level	January
Narayanganj High School, Narayanganj	Narayanganj – 1400	NCTB: Bengali	1885	Play Group to S.S.C. Level	January
Narayanganj Bar Academy	Narayanganj – 1400	NCTB: Bengali	1906	Play Group to S.S.C. Level	January
Cambrian School and College	Campus-1: Plot-2, Gulshan Circle-2, Dhaka Campus-2: Sahid Abdul Aziz Sarak, Jogannathpur, Dhaka (Near Bashundhara) Campus-3: KA-53/3, Nodda, Baridhara, Dhaka	Bangla Medium and English Version	2004	Playgroup to HSC	
Bangladesh International School & College	New DOHS Mohakhali, Dhaka Cantonment, Dhaka	NCTB for Bangla medium and Edexcel for English medium	14 March 1995	Playgroup to 12th grade	January
Navy Anchorage School and College	Khilkhet branch: Khilkhet Naval Area, Namapara, Khilkhet, Dhaka-1229 NHQ branch: Navala Head Quarter Complex, Banani, Dhaka-1213	NCTB		Playgroup to Class 10	October–December
Bottomley Home Girls' High School	Farmgate, Dhaka Cantonment, Dhaka				
Eminence International School & College	108 Gulshan Avenue, Gulshan, Dhaka – 1212	Edexcel	2006	9th – 12th grade	January & August
Faizur Rahman Ideal School	Khilgaon, Malibagh, Dhaka	NCTB	2003	1st – 10th grade	January
S. F. X. Greenherald International Schools	24 Asad Avenue, Mohammadpur, Dhaka-1207	Syllabus English Medium School Under University Of Cambridge International Examinations Curriculum	1972	Kindergarten 1 to A Level	July
Manarat Dhaka International School and College	House-106 Rd-104, Dhaka-1212	Syllabus Edexcel	1987	Playgroup to A-Level	
Mastermind School	Main campus: House-5, Road-12, Dhanmondi R/A, Dhaka.	Both Edexcel and Cambridge syllabus	1999	Playgroup – A'level	
Maple Leaf International School	House-31, Road-14A, Dhanmondi R/A Dhaka-1209	Edexcel: GCSE	1972	Playgroup – 12th grade	July
Sunnydale School	Senior section-1: House-34, Road-7, Dhanmondi R/A, Dhaka-1209 Senior section-2: Lalmatia, Dhaka. Middle section: House-66, Road-11/A, Dhanmondi R/A, Dhaka-1209 Junior section-1: House-102, Road-9/A, Dhanmondi R/A, Dhaka-1209 Junior section-2: 5/2 Gaznavi Road, Block-B, Mohammadpur, Dhaka-1225	Syllabus Cambridge International Examinations	1985	Playgroup to A'level	
Sunbeams School	Uttara campus: Rd No. 12/B, Uttara, Dhaka-1230		1978	Playgroup to A-Level	
PrimRose Kindergarten & School	House-12/A-1, Rd.-2, Shaymoli, Dhaka-1207	NCTB	1990	Playgroup – class-5	January–December
Playpen school	Senior campus: House-271, Block–C, Road-14 Block-C, Bashundhara R/A, Dhaka-1229 Junior campus: Shafiat Sobhan Sanvir Road, House-54, Block-D, Bashundhara R/A, Dhaka-1229	Cambridge International Examination syllabus	1977	Playgroup to Grade 12	July–June
Ebenezer International School	Plot 288/A, Block-C, Bashundhara R/A, Dhaka-1229	Edexcel	1998	Pre-Kindergarten to Grade 12	July–June
Seabreeze International School	House No. 02, Road-128, Gulshan-1, Dhaka-1212	Edexcel	2005	Play Group to A' Level	July–June
South Breeze School	10/A Dhanmondi	GCSE	1986	Playgroup – 11th grade	June
British Primary School Dhaka (BPSD)	Road-15, House-63, Block-D, Banani, Dhaka-1215	Cambridge curriculum	2017	Preschool to Class 2	June to July
SOS Hermann Gmeiner College	Section-13, Mirpur, Dhaka	Prescribed By Dhaka Education Board	1986	Playgroup - Class 12	December & January
National Ideal School	Sector 13, Gaisul Ajam Road, Uttara, Dhaka-1230	NCTB: Bengali	2001	Playgroup – 10th grade	December
Shaheed Police Smrity School & College	Mirpur – 14, Dhaka – 1206	NCTB	1999	1st – 12th grade	January (Grade I to Grade X), July (Grade XI to Grade XII)
Bir Shrestha Munshi Abdur Rouf Public College	Dhaka	Prescribed By Dhaka Education Board	1984	Co-Education (Grades 1–12)	January for (Grade 1-10), Jun-July for (Grade 11-12)
Viquarunnisa Noon School & College	Main campus: 1/A New Bailey Road, Dhaka-1000 Dhanmondi branch: House no.6, Road no.8, Dhanmondi R/A, Dhaka-1207 Bashundhara branch: Block- F, Road No. 6, Bashundhara R/A Dhaka-1229 Azimpur branch: 101 New Market - Pilkhana Rd, Dhaka-1205	Prescribed By Dhaka Education Board	1952	Girls (Grades 1–12)	
Adamjee Cantonment Public School & College	Dhaka Cantonment	Prescribed By Dhaka Education Board	1960	Boys (Grades 2–10); Co-Educational (Grades 11–12)	
Mohammadpur Govt. Boys High School, Dhaka	Humayun Road, Mohammadpur, Dhaka 1207	Prescribed By Dhaka Education Board	1967	Class One to SSC Level	November–December
Mirpur Cantonment Public School & College	Mirpur Cantonment, Mirpur, Dhaka-1216	NCTB	2014	Playgroup to Class 12	
DPS STS School Dhaka	Junior section: Plot-4, Road-13, Sector-6, Uttara Model Town, Dhaka-1230 Senior section: Plot-ED-01, Road-1, Sector-15, Uttara Model Town, Dhaka-1230	Cambridge curriculum	2009	Playgroup to Grade 12	
Oxford International School, Dhaka	House # 34, Road # 16 (New), 27 (Old), Dhanmondi, Dhaka	Syllabus English Medium School Under University Of Cambridge International Examinations Curriculum	1987	Pre-School (Play Group to Kindergarten), Primary School (Class 1 to Class 5), Lower Secondary School (Class 6 to Class 7), O Level (Class 8 to Class 10), A Level (Class 11 to Class 12)	
American International School of Dhaka	12 United Nations Rd, Baridhara, Dhaka-1212	IB Curriculum	1972	Pre-Kindergarten Through Grade 12	
Life Preparatory School	House No- 23, Isha Khan Avenue, Sector- 6, Uttara, Dhaka-1230			Playgroup to A level	
Armanitola Government High School	Armanitola	Syllabus	1904		
Sharoj International College	Mirpur-10	Prescribed By Dhaka Education Board	2003	Primary (Grade I to Grade V), Junior (Grade VI to Grade VIII), Secondary (Grade IX to Grade X), Higher Secondary (Grade XI to Grade XII)	January (Grade I to Grade X), July (Grade XI to Grade XII)
Bashir Uddin Adarsha High School and College	Mirpur	Syllabus Dhaka Education Board	1968	Boys and Girls (Grades 1~10); Co-Educational (Grades 11~12)	December–January
Baridhara Scholars Institution	Road 11, House- Shima Pharmacy		2005		Any time
Darland International School	House-5, Road-11/2, Block-B, Section-10, Mirpur, Dhaka-1216	Edexcel	1994	Playgroup to A'level	
Holy Cross High School	Tejhgaon	Prescribed By Dhaka Education Board	1912		
Willes Little Flower School & College	Location 85, Kakrail, Dhaka 1000	Syllabus Edexcel for English medium, NCTB for Bangla medium and English version	1956	From Play-Group to A Level	November–December
Bangladesh International Tutorial	House No. 02, Road-128, Gulshan-1, Dhaka-1212	Syllabus Edexcel GCSE	19	Play Group to A Levels	July–August
Dhaka Government Muslim High School		Prescribed By Dhaka Education Board			
Dhaka International Tutorial			1995		
Dhaka Residential Model College		Prescribed By Dhaka Education Board	1960		
Dhanmondi Government Boys' High School	Manik Mia Avenue, Dhanmondi, Dhaka-1207	Prescribed By Dhaka Education Board	1965	Class One to SSC Level	November–December
Dhanmondi Government Girls' High School		Prescribed By Dhaka Education Board			
Dhanmondi Tutorial	House # 8, Road # 14, Dhanmondi, Dhaka 1205	Syllabus Gce (Edexcel)	1972	Play Group to Class XII (A Level)	January–December
European Standard School	Dhanmondi	GCE	2001		
Green Gems International School	House-33/A, Road-9/A, Dhanmondi R/A, Dhaka-1209	Edexcel	1991	Playgroup to O'level	June–July
Government Laboratory High School	Mirpur Road, Dhaka-1205	Prescribed By Dhaka Education Board	1961	Class 1 to Class 12	
Gulshan Model High School & College	Gulshan – 2, Dhaka – 1212	Prescribed By Dhaka Education Board	1972	Class 1 to Class 12	December – January
Hurdco International School	Bashundhara Main Gate, Bashundhara Road, Dhaka-1229	Syllabus of Cambridge International Examination (CIE)	1997	Playgroup – 12th grade	June–July, December–January
Ideal School & College	Pirjongi Mazar, Motijheel, Dhaka – 1000	Prescribed By Dhaka Education Board	1965	1st – 12th grade	December – January
International School Dhaka	Plot-80, Road-9, Block-E, Dhaka-1229	Syllabus Ib	1999	From Nursery to Diploma	
Park International School and College	House-386, Block-B, Chowdhury Para (Near Vooter Adda Restaurant), Khilgaon, Dhaka-1219	Cambridge curriculum and National curriculum (English Version)	2009	Playgroup to A'level and Class 5 to HSC	
Jamila Aynul High School	Khelshi Road, Shamoly Dhaka-1207		1980	Nursery to SSC	January to December
Junior Laboratory High School	House No: 38, Road No: 10/A, Dhanmondi, Dhaka-1209		1984	Nursery to SSC for Bangla medium and up to O level for English medium	
Kalyanpur Girls' School & College		Syllabus			
Tejgaon Government High School	Tejgaon, Dhaka-1215	Prescribed By Dhaka Education Board	1935	Class One to SSC	January
Khilgaon Government High School	Khilgaon, Dhaka-1219	NCTB	1967	Class 1 to Class 12	December
Karatitola C.M.S. Memorial High School		Syllabus	1977		
Kurmitola High School	KhIIlkhet, Dhaka	Syllabus	1948	Class 1 to Class 10	
Motijheel Government Boys' High School	Location Motijheel, Dhaka	Syllabus	1957	Class 1 to Class 12	
The Ark Int'l School	Location H-11, Road-28 (Old), Dhanmondi R/A, Dhaka-1209	Cambridge University Curriculum and Syllabus combined with Bangladesh National Curriculum	2006	Play Group to O level	January–December
Premier School Dhaka	Location House-29, Road-Gareeb-E-Newaz Road, Uttara, Dhaka-1230	Syllabus Edexcel	2009	Play Group to Igcse/o'level	July–June
Ashraf Ali Bahumukhi High School	Atabaha, Kaliakoir	Syllabus Edexcel	1997	Secondary School.	
Green Scholars International School & College	Location 284, Dania road, Dhaka	Syllabus Edexcel	2013	From Play-Group to O'Level and A'Level	January – December
The New School Dhaka,	Location House:39, Road: 1, Banani, Dhaka-1213	Syllabus Edexcel, London	2007	Play Group to Advanced Level	June/July and December/January
Siddheswari Boys' High School	Siddheswari, Dhaka-1205	SSC	1933		
University Laboratory School and College, I.E.R., Dhaka University, Dhaka	Location Dhaka University, Dhaka-1000	Syllabus Dhaka Education Board	1964	K.G. to College	January and May
Uttara High School & College	Road No 1 & 27, Sector # 7, Uttara Model Town, Dhaka-1230	Syllabus	1985	From I to XII	
Don Bosco School and College	Road No# 13, House # 22, Sector # 4, Uttara, Dhaka-1230	Syllabus English Medium	1985	From Playgroup to A Levels	
Nakhal Para Hossain Ali High School	Nakhal Para, Tejgaon, Dhaka-1215	Syllabus Bengali Medium	1957	From Playgroup to SSC	January
New Ananda English School	Nakhalpara, Tejgaon, Dhaka-1215	Syllabus: English Medium/Bangla Medium/English Version		From Play group to Class-3	
Civil Aviation High School	Tejgaon	Bengali Medium	1963	Kindergarten to Class 10	
Jasim Uddin Institute	48 Joar Sahara, Badda, Dhaka 1229	Syllabus Bengali Medium	2005	Play Group to Class Ten	December
British American English Medium School	Uttara, Dhaka-1230	Syllabus Cambridge	2004	Playgroup to A-Level	
Charu Aunggon Art School & Fine Art Academy	D.C.C. KA-74/1 Shahjadpur, Gulshan, Dhaka-1212		2003	Play Group to Class Nine	Anytime
Domrakandi High School	VI- Domrakandi, Po- Komorpur, Kabi Jasim Matri Sarak, Faridpur	Class 6-10	1969	Anytime	
Hope International School	1/1a, Lane-19, Block-b, Mirpur-10, Dhaka	Bengali Medium	2001	Playgroup to Class-9	January
Civil Aviation High School	Kurmitola, Khilkhet, Dhaka 1229	Class Kg-10	1978	January	
Fulknuri Kildergarten & high School	House no 17, Road no 2, Block-B, Nobodoy Housing,	Adabor, Dhaka 1207.			
Baliapara High School And College	Narayanganj .	1943		February	
British Columbia School	House#7(New), Road#27(old), Dhanmondi, Dhaka	2005			
London School Of English (LSE)	Aganagar Bridge Road, Kadamtali, Keraniganj, Dhaka-1310.	Edexel & Our School Standard Curriculum.	2014	Pre-play to A level	July–June & January–December
Moulovir Char High School	Vill: Moulovir Char, Post Office: Moulovir Char Hat, Upazila: Charbhadrasan, Zilla: Faridpur 7810	NCTB: Bangla		Grade 6 – SSC-level	January
Banani Bidyaniketan School and College	Road 23/A, Dhaka - Mymensingh Hwy, Dhaka-1213	Syllabus Dhaka Education Board	1972	Playgroup to HSC Level	December–January

== Khulna Division ==
Name	Location	Syllabus	Est.	Levels	Admission period
Bagerhat Bohumukhi Collegiate School	Shahid Minar Road, Bagerhat	NCTB			
Bagerhat govt. High School	Bagerhat	National curriculum	1947	class 3 to class 9	January
Govt. Laboratory High School, Khulna	Teligati, Fulbarigate, Khulna	NCTB & Jessore Education Board	1967	Class 3 to Secondary School Certificate (S.S.C) level. (equivalent to O Level)	January (second or third week declared by the school authority)
Khulna Zilla School, Khulna	Khulna	NCTB & Jessore Education Board	1885	Class 3 to Secondary School Certificate (S.S.C) level. (equivalent to O Level)	January
Khulna Public School & College	Boyra, Khulna	NCTB & Jessore Education Board		Secondary School Certificate (S.S.C) & Higher Secondary Cirtificate (H.S.C) level. (equivalent to O/A Level)	January
Hazi Foyez Uddin Girls High School, Khulna	Boyra Bazar, Khulna	NCTB & Jessore Education Board	1942	Class 1 to Secondary School Certificate (S.S.C) level. (equivalent to O Level)	January
Govt. Cornation Girls High School, Khulna	Ahsan Ahmed Road, Khulna	NCTB & Jessore Education Board		Class 3 to Secondary School Certificate (S.S.C) level. (equivalent to O Level)	January
Khulna Govt. Girls High School	Boyra, Khulna	NCTB & Jessore Education Board		Class 1 to Secondary School Certificate (S.S.C) level. (equivalent to O Level)	January
St. Joseph High School, Khulna	Ahasan Ahmed Road, Khulna	NCTB & Jessore Education Board		Secondary School Certificate (S.S.C) level. (equivalent to O Level)	January
Cantonment Public School & College, Khulna	Jahanabad, Khulna	NCTB Syllabus		Class 3 to Secondary School Certificate (S.S.C) level. (equivalent to O Level)	January
Khulna Collegiate Girls School	Khulna	NCTB & Jessore Education Board		Secondary & Higher Secondary	January
Military Collegiate School Khulna (MCSK)	Khulna	NCTB & Jessore Education Board	2002	Class VI to Higher Secondary Certificate (H.S.C)	January
Metropolitan Police Line School	Mujgunni Residential Area, Khulna	NCTB & Jessore Education Board		Secondary	January
Primary Training Institute (P.T.I)	Komlapur, Nilmoniganj, Chuadanga – 7200, Khulna, Bangladesh	Primary Education Board	1953		January
Bheramara Pilot High School (BPHS)	High Road, Bheramara, Kushtia – 7040, Bangladesh	NCTB & Jessore Education Board	1918		January
Nilmoniganj Secondary School	Nilmoniganj, Chuadanga – 7200, Khulna, Bangladesh	Secondary Education	1967		January
Seva Sangha Girl's High School	Jessore	NCTB & Jessore Education Board	1962	Secondary	
Nutan Khayertala Secondary School	Jessore	Jessore Education Board	1963	Secondary	
Jessore Cantonment High School	Jessore	NCTB & Jessore Education Board		Secondary	January
Dawood Public School	Jessore Cantonment	NCTB & Jessore Education Board		Class 1 to Secondary School Certificate (S.S.C) level. (equivalent to O Level)	January
Jessore Zilla School	Jessore	NCTB & Jessore Education Board	1838	Class 3 to Secondary School Certificate (S.S.C) level. (equivalent to O Level)	January
Jessore Govt. Girls High School	Kotwali, Jessore	NCTB & Jessore Education Board		Secondary School Certificate (S.S.C) level. (equivalent to O Level)	January
Police Line Secondary School, Jessore	Jessore	NCTB & Jessore Education Board		Secondary School Certificate (S.S.C) level. (equivalent to O Level)	January
Jessore Rifles School	Jessore	NCTB & Jessore Education Board		Secondary School Certificate (S.S.C) level. (equivalent to O Level)	January
Keshabpur Higher Secondary School	Keshabpur, Jashore	Board of Intermediate and Secondary Education, Jessore	1944	6-12	January
Government Kaliganj Secondary School	Satkhira	Board of Intermediate and Secondary Education, Jessore	1933	Secondary School Certificate (S.S.C) level.	January
Moshin Boys High School, Daulatpur, Khulna	Khulna	Jessore Education Board	1966	6 to 10	
Chaprail High School	Kaliganj, Jhenaidah	NCTB & Jessore Education Board	1963	Class 1 to Secondary School Certificate (S.S.C) level. (equivalent to O Level)	January (second or third week declared by the school authority)
Maheshpur Boys High School	Maheshpur, Jhenaidah	Jessore Education Board	1863	Secondary & Vocational	
II College	Shipyeard, Khulna	College-Inter		Jessore Education Board	
Satkhira Government High School	Satkhira	NCTB & Jessore Education Board	1962	Secondary School Certificate (S.S.C)	January
Sarafatil Dakhil Madrasha	Dhakhin Kakrabunia	Jessore Education Board			
Maheshpur Girls High School	Maheshpur, Jhenaidah	Jessore Education Board		Secondary & Vocational	
Rupsha Bohumukhi High School	Khulna	NCTB			
New Children Grace School	Maheshpur, Jhenaidah	NCTB : English (up to Grade 3)	2000	Primary Education (Nursery to Class Five)	December- January
Jhenidah Cadet College (JCC)	Jhenidah	NCTB & Jessore Education Board	1963	Secondary & Higher Secondary	December–January
Arpara Government Ideal High School(AGIHS)	Arpara, Jashore Road, Magura	Board of Intermediate and Secondary Education, Jashore	1945	Class 6 to 10	

== Mymensingh Division ==
Name	Location	Syllabus & Medium	Est.	Levels	Admission Period
Government Laboratory High School, Mymensingh	Mymensingh	NCTB-Bengali	1991	Preschool to secondary	January to December
Tarundia Jagat Memorial High School, Ishwarganj, Mymensingh	Tarundia, Ishwarganj, Mymensingh	NCTB-Bengali	1989	Preschool to secondary	January to December
K B High School	Mymensingh		1971		
Habirbari Union Sonar Bengali High School	Seedstore Bazar, Valuka, Mymensingh-2240	Prescribed By Dhaka Education Board	1969	1st – 10th grade	December – January
Atharabari M.C. High School	Atharabari, Ishwarganj, Mymensingh	NCTB-Bengali	1910	Secondary	January to December
Kalsindur Government Primary School	Kalsindur, Dhobaura, Mymensingh	NCTB-Bengali		1st – 5th grade	January to December
Kandipara Askar Ali High School	Kandipara, Gaffargaon, Mymensingh	NCTB-Bengali	1906	Secondary	January to December
Mukul Niketon High School	Mymensingh	NCTB-Bengali	1970	Secondary	January to December
Mymensingh Zilla School	Mymensingh	NCTB-Bengali	1853	3rd – 10th grade	January to December
Rajibpur Aftab Uddin High School	Rajibpur, Ishwarganj, Mymensingh	NCTB-Bengali	1930	Secondary	January to December
Vidyamoyee Govt. Girls' High School	Mymensingh	NCTB-Bengali	1873	4th – 10th grade	January to December
Jamalpur Zilla School	Jamalpur Sadar, Jamalpur	NCTB-Bengali	1881	3rd – 10th grade	January to December
Datta High School	Netrokona	NCTB-Bengali	1889	1st – 10th grade	January to December
Kendua Joyhari Spry Government High School	Kendua, Netrokona	NCTB-Bengali	1832	6th – 10th grade	January to December
Sherpur Government Victoria Academy	Sherpur Sadar, Sherpur	NCTB-Bengali	1887	Secondary	January to December

== Rajshahi Division ==
Name	Location	Syllabus	Est.	Levels	Admission period
Shaheed Colonel Kazi Emdadul Haque Public School	BGB Sector Headquarter, Rajshahi	National Curriculum and Textbook Board in Bengali	2010	Nursery to Secondary School Certificate	December - January
Hat Khujipur High School	Bagmara Upazila, Rajshahi				
Bagha Model High School	Bagha Upazila, Rajshahi	National Curriculum and Textbook Board In Bengali	1966	Class 6 Up to 10. (Secondary School Certificate)	
Blue Bell English Medium School	Kadirgonj (Near Nazmul Haque School), Boalia, Rajshahi	Edexcel		Playgroup to A'level	December–January and June–July
Panchbibi L. B. Pilot Govt. High School	Panchbibi Upazila, Joypurhat	National Curriculum and Textbook Board In Bengali	1904	Class 6 Up to 10. (Secondary School Certificate)	January
Naogaon K.D. Government High School	Khash Naogaon, Naogaon	National Curriculum and Textbook Board In Bengali	1884	3rd Standard-10th Standard (Secondary School Certificate)	December–January
Millennium Scholastic School & College	Jahangirabad Cantonment, Bogra	National Curriculum and Textbook Board In English	1998	(Higher Secondary (School) Certificate)	January
School Of Physics & Applied Math	Shibbati, Kalitola, Bogra	National Curriculum and Textbook Board in Bengali	2006	Higher Secondary (School) Certificate for physics by Ministry of Education (Bangladesh)	Any
Chamagram H, N High School	Hamagram, Baroghoria Chapai Nawabgonj	Syllabus Rajshahi Education Board			
Sonadighi High School	Godagari, Rajshahi	Rajshahi Education Board	1994	Class 5 to Class 10	
Karbala High School	Moharajpur, Chapai Nawabgonj	Syllabus Rajshahi Education Board			
Technical Training Center	Location Baroghoria, Chapai Nawabgonj	Syllabus Rajshahi Education Board			
Polytechnical Institute	Baroghoria, Chapai Nawabgonj	Syllabus Rajshahi Education Board			
Harimohon Govt High School	Location Chapai Nawabgonj	Syllabus Rajshahi Education Board	1895	Secondary Level	January–February
Pukurpar Dakhil Madrasha	Location Ullahpara Upzala	Syllabus Rajshahi Education Board	1994		
Nawabgonj Govt College	Location Chapai Nawabgonj	Syllabus Rajshahi Education Board			
Bogra Cantonment Public School and College	Majhira Cantonment Bogra	Syllabus Rajshahi Education Board			
Natore Govt. Boys High School	Natore Sadar Upazila, Natore	National Curriculum and Textbook Board In Bengali	1910	3-10(SSC)	December
Natore Govt. Girls High School	Natore Sadar Upazila, Natore	National Curriculum and Textbook Board In Bengali	1944	3-10(SSC)	December
Gurudaspur Pilot High School	Gurudaspur, Natore	Syllabus Rajshahi Education Board			
Harina Bagbati High School	Bagbati, Sirajgonj Sador, Sirajgonj	Syllabus Rajshahi Education Board	1868	Secondary Level	January / February
Saraswatipur High School			1964	Secondary Level	
Seroil Govt. High School	Seroil, P.O.-Ghoramara, P.S-Boalia, Rajshahi	National curriculum (Bengali)	1967	Secondary level	January
Dhankundi Shahnaj Siraj High School	Sherpur Upazila, Bogra	National Curriculum and Textbook Board In Bengali	1996	Class 6 Up to 10. (Secondary School Certificate)	January
Shimul Memorial North South School, Rajshahi	Luxmipur, Rajshahi	National Curriculum and Textbook Board In Bengali and English	2003	Class Play Up to Ten. (Secondary School Certificate)	January
Ashraf Zindani High School, Somaj	Chatmohar, Pabna, Rajshahi	National Curriculum and Textbook Board In Bengali and English	1972	Class Six to Ten.	January

== Rangpur Division ==
Name	Location	Syllabus	Est.	Levels	Admission period
Araji Thangzara Habibur Rahaman High School	Araji Shak Sundur, Lalmonirhat District	Syllabus Dinanpur Education Board		Class Six to Ten	January
Bir Uttam Shaheed Samad School & College, Rangpur	Rangpur Cantonment, Rangpur District	Syllabus Dinanpur Education Board	1974	Play Group to Ten	January
BIAM Laboratory School (English Version), Rangpur	Lalkuthi, Dhap, Rangpur District	Syllabus Dinanpur Education Board	2004	Play Group to Ten	January
Cantonment Public School and College, Rangpur	Dhap, City Bypass, Rangpur	Syllabus Dinanpur Education Board		Play Group to Ten	January
Debiganj Alodini Government Girls High School	Debiganj, Panchagarh	Syllabus Dinanpur Education Board		Girls (Grades 6–10)	January
Debiganj Girls High School	Debiganj, Panchagarh	Syllabus Dinanpur Education Board		Girls (Grades 6–10)	January
Debiganj Riverview Girls High School	Debiganj, Panchagarh	Syllabus Dinanpur Education Board		Grades 6–10	January
Dr. Major (Rec.) T. Zaman High School	Debiganj, Panchagarh	Syllabus Dinajpur Education Board	1989	Boys (Grades 6–10)	January
Pantahbari Balakandi Govt. Primary School	Rajarhat, Kurigram	Syllabus Dinanpur Education Board	1941	(Grades 1–5)	January
Pantahbari Balakandi High School	Rajarhat, Kurigram	Syllabus Dinanpur Education Board	1941	(Grades 6–10)	January
Rangpur Zilla School	Kachari bazaar road, Rangpur District-5400	Syllabus Dinanpur Education Board	1832	Class Three to Ten	January
Thakurgaon Government Boys' High School	Thakurgaon – 5100	National Curriculum and Textbook Board In Bengali	1904	Class Three to Ten	January
Thakurgaon Government Girls' High School	Kalibari, Thakurgaon – 5100	National Curriculum and Textbook Board In Bengali	1957	Class Three to Ten	January
Ulipur M.S. High School & College	Ulipur, Kurigram-5620	Syllabus Dinajpur Education Board	1868	Class Six to Twelve	January

== Sylhet Division ==
Name	Location	Syllabus	Est.	Levels	Admission period
Sachna Bazar High School	Jamalganj Upazila, Sunamganj	Syllabus Sylhet Education Board	1989	6 to 10	January
Government Jubilee High School	Sunamganj	Syllabus Sylhet Education Board	1887	Class 3 to Class 10	
Aided High School	Tantipara, Sylhet	Syllabus Sylhet Education Board	1800	Boys (Grades 6–10)	
Moulvibazar Government High School	Moulvibazar	National Curriculum and Textbook Board	1891	Boys' (Class 3–10)	
Jalalabad Cantonment Public School & College	Jalalabad Cantonment, Sylhet	Syllabus Sylhet Education Board	1999	Boys and Girls (1-12)	
Jubilee High School	Sunamganj	Syllabus Sylhet Education Board	1900	Girls and Boys (Grades 6–10)	
Oxford International School and College	Shahajalal Upashahar, Sylhet	Syllabus National English & Bengali Medium	2005	Boys and Girls (Grades 6–10)	January
Siraj Uddin Ahmed Academy	Sreerampur, Sylhet	Sylhet Education Board	1995	Playgroup to Class 10	
Palash High School	Sunamganj	Syllabus Sylhet Education Board	1964	Girls and Boys (Grades 6–10)	
Patli Union High School	Sunamganj	Syllabus Sylhet Education Board	1975	Boys (Grades 6–10); Girls (Grades 6–10)	
Quazi Jalaluddin High School	Kumarpara, Sylhet	Syllabus Sylhet Education Board	1800	Boys (Grades 6–10)	
Raja Girish Chandra High School	Bandar Bazaar, Sylhet	Syllabus Sylhet Education Board	1800	Boys (Grades 6–10)	
Saarc International School & College	Sourav 1/1, Roynagar, Shibgonj, Sylhet	Syllabus Sylhet Education Board	2009	Boys (Grades Play – Class Nine); Girls (Grades Play – Class Nine), College	

== See also ==
- Education in Bangladesh
- List of zilla schools of Bangladesh
- List of English-medium schools in Bangladesh
- List of colleges in Bangladesh
- List of Intermediate and Secondary Education Boards in Bangladesh
- Bangladesh Madrasah Education Board
- Bangladesh Technical Education Board
