= BAF Shaheen College Kurmitola =

Educational institution in Dhaka

- বিএএফ শাহীন কলেজ কুর্মিটোলা
- Seal of BAF Shaheen College Kurmitola

Location
- Kurmitola, Dhaka Cantonment, Dhaka - 1206, Bangladesh
- Coordinates: 23°49′45.6″N 90°24′10.4″E

Information
- Other name: BAFSK; Kurmitola Shaheen
- Type: School and College
- Motto: Bengali: শিক্ষা-সংযম-শৃঙ্খলা (Education-Restraint-Discipline)
- Established: 1 January 1972; 54 years ago
- Founder: Bangladesh Air Force
- Sister school: BAF Shaheen Colleges
- Authority: Bangladesh Air Force
- Principal: Group Captain AKM Rahmat Ullah, psc
- Staff: 50+
- Teaching staff: 160+
- Grades: KG to 12th
- Gender: Co-educational
- Enrollment: 7,255
- Language: Bangla and English
- Colors: Uniform: Boys: Sky blue Khaki; Girls: Sky blue White
- Affiliation: Directorate of Secondary and Higher Education
- Alumni name: Ex Shaheen
- Board: Dhaka Education Board
- Website: bafsk.edu.bd

BAF Shaheen College Kurmitola (Bengali: বিএএফ শাহীন কলেজ কুর্মিটোলা), commonly abbreviated as BAFSK and also known as Kurmitola Shaheen, is a school and college operated by the Bangladesh Air Force.

The institution is located in Kurmitola, within the Dhaka Cantonment area of Dhaka, Bangladesh.

Established on 1 January 1972, the institution provides education from kindergarten through Grade 12. While it was originally established to cater to the children of Air Force personnel, the college is also open to civilian students.

== History ==
BAF Shaheen College Kurmitola was established in 1972 as the Air Force School. In 1980, it was renamed BAF Shaheen School. The college section was introduced in 1982, following which the institution adopted its present name, BAF Shaheen College Kurmitola. Since then, it has developed into a non-residential academic institution managed by the Bangladesh Air Force under the supervision of the Ministry of Education (Bangladesh) and the Dhaka Education Board.

The English version section of the institution was introduced in 2010 for classes up to Grade V and was subsequently expanded to Grade X in 2015. In 2019, a new college building was constructed, which now accommodates both the Bengali- and English-medium college branches.

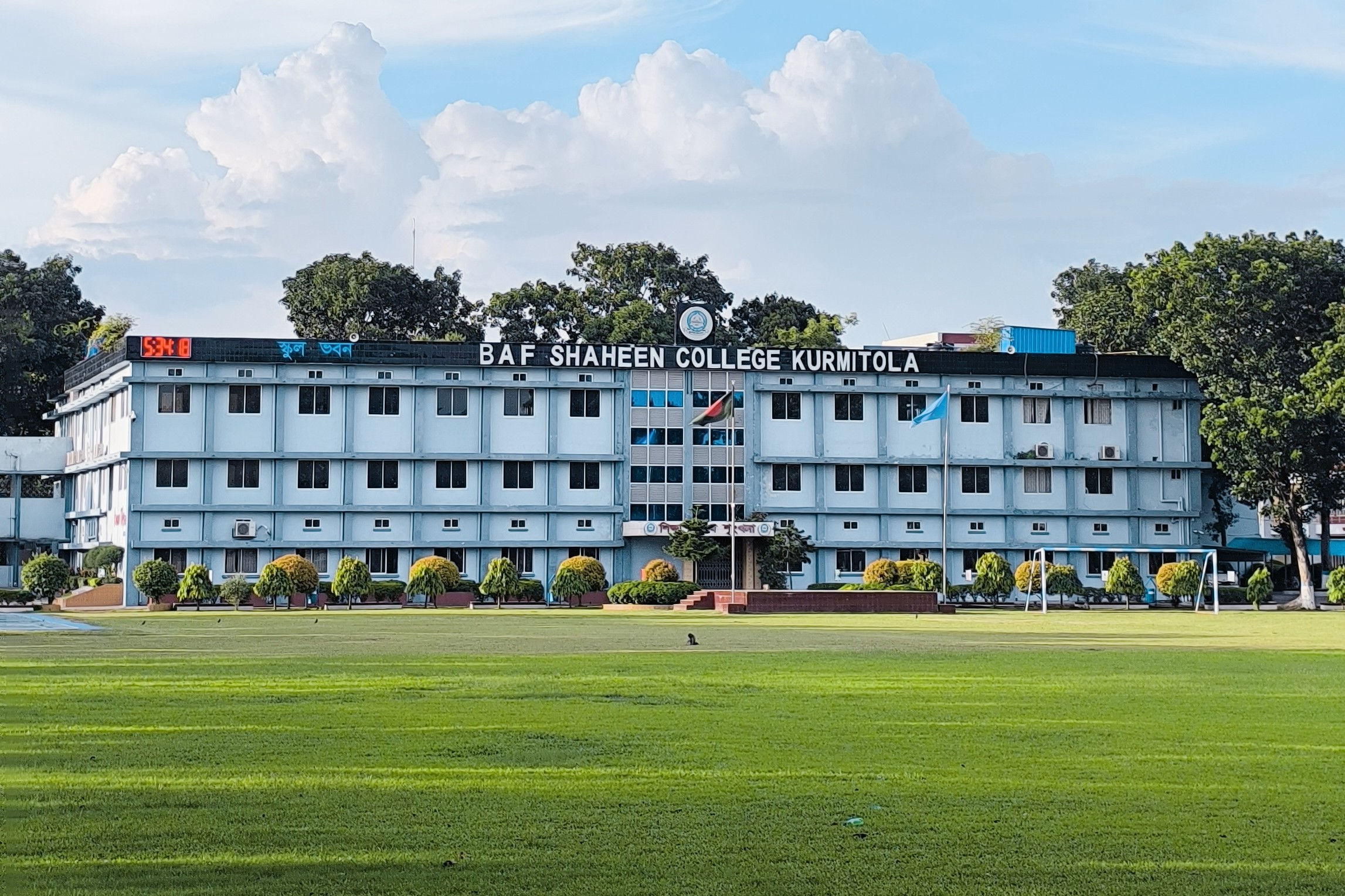
Front view of BAF Shaheen College Kurmitola

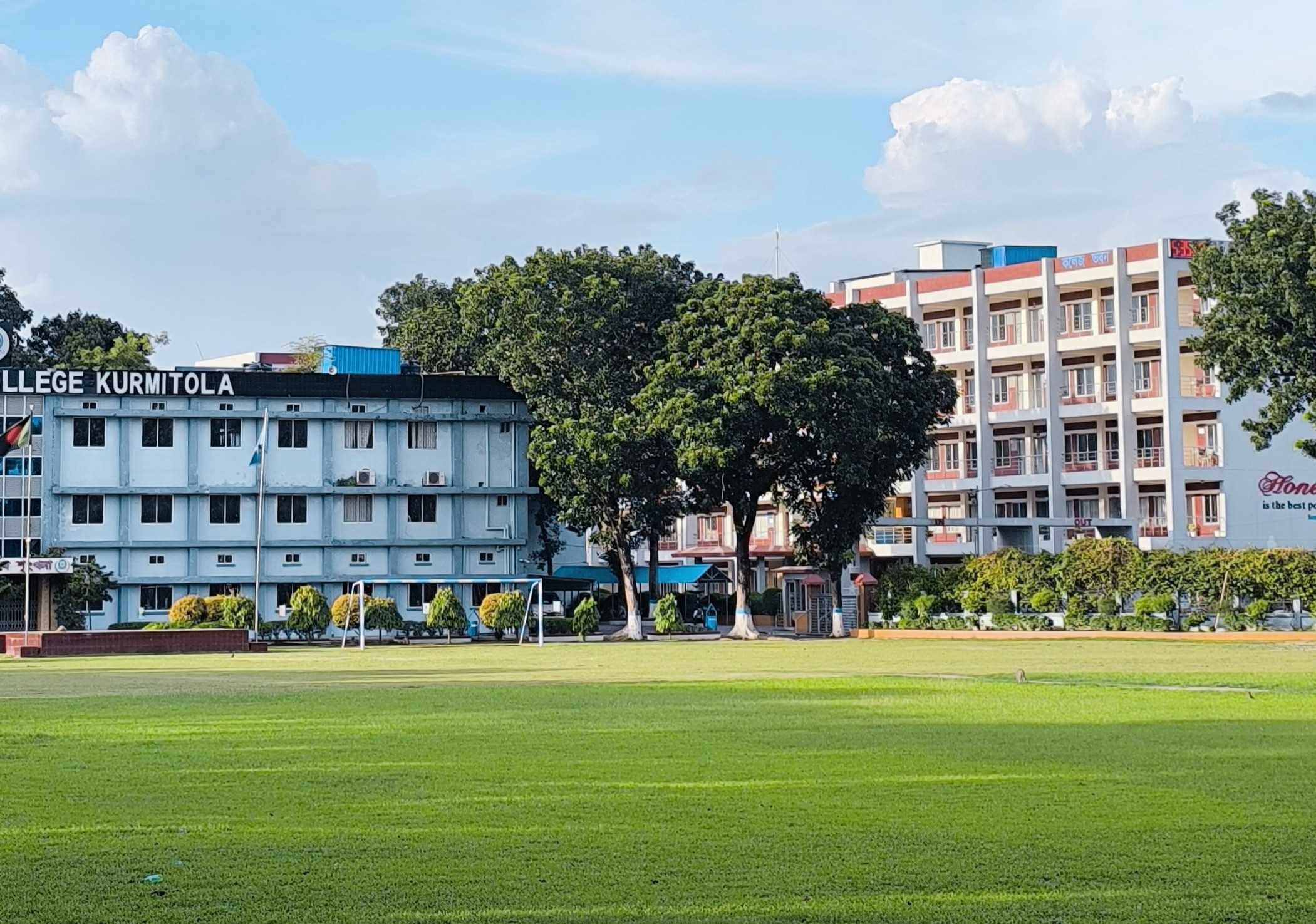
College building of BAF Shaheen College Kurmitola

The college is situated within Bangladesh Air Force Base Bir Uttam A. K. Khandker in Kurmitola, Dhaka Cantonment, and is located adjacent to the runway of Hazrat Shahjalal International Airport. The campus comprises a school building, a college building, an English version school, a playground, a cafeteria, and a Shaheed Minar.

== Academic structure ==
BAF Shaheen College Kurmitola follows the curriculum prescribed by the National Curriculum and Textbook Board. The institution operates in both Bengali and English mediums from kindergarten to Class XII and offers education across three major streams: Science, Humanities, and Business Studies.

As of 2025, the institution enrols approximately 7,255 students, with around 6,286 studying in the Bengali version and 969 in the English version. The college employs more than 160 teaching staff members, along with over 50 administrative and support personnel.

The institution encourages student participation in a range of co-curricular and extracurricular activities, including sports, debating, cultural programmes, and community service initiatives.

The college also organises annual cultural festivals, science fairs, sports competitions, and observances of national events, attracting participation from students as well as members of the wider community.

== Notable alumni ==
- Sarwar Hossain – Retired officer of the Bangladesh Army who served as the Military Secretary to the President of Bangladesh. He completed his early education at BAF Shaheen College Kurmitola.

== See also ==
- BAF Shaheen Colleges
- List of colleges in Bangladesh
- List of schools in Bangladesh
- Education in Bangladesh
