= Technical and Madrasah Education Division =

Bangladesh government division

- Abbreviation: TMED
- Formation: 2016
- Headquarters: Dhaka, Bangladesh
- Region served: Bangladesh
- Official language: Bengali
- Education Minister: A. N. M. Ehsanul Hoque Milan
- Secretary: Md. Daud Mia
- Parent organization: Ministry of Education
- Budget: ৳18457 crore (US$1.5 billion) (2024-2025)
- Website: tmed.gov.bd

Technical and Madrasah Education Division (কারিগরি ও মাদ্রাসা শিক্ষা বিভাগ) is a Bangladesh government division under the Ministry of Education responsible for Technical and Madrasah education in Bangladesh. It is responsible for 113 public technical education institutes and 03 public madrassas and 4727 private technical education institutes and 7620 private madrassas. Md Daud Mia is the secretary and head of the division.

== History ==
The Government of Bangladesh split the Education Ministry into two divisions, Technical and Madrasah Education Division and Secondary and Higher Education Division, on 30 November 2016. It received 7,453 crore taka budget in 2019 which was a slight increase over the last year.

== Department ==
- Directorate of Technical Education
- Directorate of Madrasha Education
- Bangladesh Madrasah Teachers' Training Institute (BMTTI)
- Bangladesh Technical Education Board
- National Computer Training and Research Academy (NACTAR)
- Bangladesh Madrasah Education Board
