= 2017 Bangladesh textbooks criticism =

Education controversy in Bangladesh

2017 Bangladesh Textbook Controversy
- Date: January 1, 2017
- Location: Bangladesh
- Type: Educational controversy
- Theme: Textbook errors and communalism
- Cause: Errors and perceived biases in textbooks
- Participants: Ministry of Education; Bangladesh Students' Union; National Curriculum and Textbook Board; Hefazat-e-Islam Bangladesh; Bangladesh Udichi Shilpigoshthi; Bangladesh Hindu Buddhist Christian Unity Council
- Outcome: Formation of a review committee, suspension of NCTB officials
- Inquiries: Review committee formed by NCTB
- Key Issues: Gender discrimination, communalism, factual errors
- Official Response: Suspension of NCTB officials, textbook revisions
- Public Reaction: Protests, demands for resignation of Education Minister
- Errors included misspellings, factual inaccuracies, and controversial content changes

Due to discussions, criticisms, and debates, various issues in the 2017 textbooks faced criticism throughout the year. On the first day of the English year, a heated debate began over the free books distributed to primary and secondary level students in Bangladesh. Later, due to errors in the textbooks, the Ministry of Education made the chief editor of NCTB, Pritish Kumar Sarkar, and senior expert Lana Humayra Khan OSD (Officer on Special Duty).

== Criticism ==
In the Bengali textbook for grade one, the word [ওড়না] (scarf) was used as an example to teach the Bengali letter [ও] (O). Many people believed that using the word [ওড়না] (scarf) expressed a form of gender discrimination. Although in the books distributed in 2013, based on the new 2012 curriculum, the sentence [ও-তে ওড়না চাই] (O for orna) was also written. Again, on page 11 of the grade one Bengali book, to explain the letter [অ] (A) as in [অজ] (goat), a picture of a goat was included, and it was shown doing something impossible—climbing a tree and eating mangoes.

In the grade three Bengali book, in the poem "Ideal Boy" by Kusumkumari Das, the line [“আমাদের দেশে হবে সেই ছেলে কবে”] ("When will there be such a boy in our country") was changed to [“আমাদের দেশে সেই ছেলে কবে হবে?”] ("In our country, when will that boy be?"). Also, instead of [“মানুষ হইতে হবে- এই তার পণ”] ("He to become human—that is his vow"), it was written as [“মানুষ হতেই হবে- এই তার পণ”] ("He must become human—this is his vow"). In the line [“হাতে প্রাণে খাট সবে শক্তি কর দান”] ("Work hard with heart and soul, give strength"), the word [খাট] (work) was spelled incorrectly as [খাটো] (short).

On the back cover of a grade three book, under a photo of Prime Minister Sheikh Hasina, a sentence in English was misspelled. While trying to express the idea of "hurting" someone, the word "heart" was written as in the organ (heart). That is, in the Hindu Religious Studies book of grade three, the sentence [‘পরনিন্দা ভালো না’] ("Backbiting is not good") was removed and replaced with "DO NOT HURT ANYBODY," according to officials of the Ministry of Primary and Mass Education. However, Udichi President Professor Safiuddin criticized the praise of the head of the government on the back covers of the books, saying, “By placing a shameless example of party flattery on the back cover, the entire textbook has been turned into a political pamphlet.”

In the grade four book “Bangladesh and Global Studies,” on page 78 in the writing about the 1971 Liberation War, the word [মুক্তিযুদ্ধ] (Liberation War) was sometimes written correctly and sometimes incorrectly as [মুকতিযুদ্ধ], and the name [বঙ্গবন্ধু] (Bangabandhu) was split with [ঙ] (ng) and [গ] (g) written separately.

In a grade five book, Hefazat-e-Islami objected to Humayun Azad's Poem Book, claiming that the poem was against the Muslims’ holy book "The Holy Quran." When the poem was removed from this year's textbook, many believed it happened because of the demands of Hefazat-e-Islami.

In the grade eight textbook, to protect female students from sexual harassment, strategies were suggested such as not staying home alone, not wearing clothes that attract attention, and not going out with unknown people. These suggestions sparked reactions on social media and other platforms.

On the other hand, in the grade eight storybook "Anandopath" (Joyful Reading), all seven stories were translations of foreign authors' stories.

== Teaching ==
According to the Ministry of Primary and Mass Education, the sentence-sequencing method is used in primary education to provide children with literacy skills. In this method, first sentences are taught, then words, and finally letters. Materials are supposed to be used at all three stages. Since 1990, the first lesson of the first grade follows this approach: in the first stage, sentences like "I read books" or "Read books" are taught, and in the second stage, the words "I," "book," and "read" are taught separately.

== Reaction ==
Following intense criticism on Facebook regarding errors in the new textbooks, NCTB formed a review committee.

According to a statement from the Amir of Hefazat,

Seventeen writings that had long been recognized for their moral and ideological value were removed from the school textbooks by changing the syllabus starting in 2013, replacing the one that had been in place until 2012. Instead, twelve new writings were added, which are theoretically directly associated with Hindutva and atheistic ideologies.

At a press conference, Udichi's general secretary, Jamshed Anwar Tapan, stated,

Our education system is currently infected with a dangerous communal poison. Inside the shiny covers of the textbooks, horrifying fundamentalist plans have been inserted, promoting communal, ethnic, and gender-based discrimination.

At an event organized by the Hindu-Buddhist-Christian Unity Council at the Dhaka Reporters Unity, general secretary Rana Dasgupta said about the textbooks,

The current state of the textbooks is inciting communalism even more. This is encouraging extremism, fundamentalism, and anti-liberation forces. All of this will affect minorities and make the coming years even more dangerous.

Student Union president Lucky Akter demanded the resignation of the education minister, accusing the textbooks of containing errors and promoting communalism.

Eighty-five prominent individuals of the country condemned and protested against the inconsistencies in the textbooks, including the inclusion of communal and religiously discriminatory content and the exclusion of important and progressive writers.

In a statement, Hefazat Amir Allama Shafi Ahmed said,

Those who are trying to stir controversy by saying that Hefazat’s demands have been fully met in the school textbooks are an extremely small and socially isolated group. They are only harming the peace and order of the country. These people find communalism and inconsistency in writing ‘ও’ ("O" – the letter O) for ওড়না ("Orna" – scarf), but they do not find any such issue in writing ‘র’ ("Ra") for রথ ("Roth" – chariot), ‘ত’ ("Ta") for তবলা ("Tabla" – a musical instrument), ‘ঢ’ ("Dha") for ঢাক ("Dhak" – drum), or ‘ঋ’ ("Ri") for ঋষি ("Rishi" – sage).

At a press conference in the Ministry of Education's conference room at the Secretariat regarding the errors in the National Curriculum and Textbook Board's books, Education Minister Nurul Islam Nahid said,

Humans can make mistakes. However, some mistakes should not have happened. There must be accountability for these errors. Those who made the mistakes and are responsible will not be spared.

NCTB Chairman Professor Narayan Chandra Saha said that, in addition to the errors under criticism, experts have also been assigned the responsibility of revising all books for the new academic year.
