= BAF Shaheen Colleges =

BAF Shaheen College
- বিএএফ শাহীন কলেজ
- Seals of eight BAF Shaheen Colleges
- Bangladesh

Information
- Type: BAF managed School and College
- Motto: Bengali: শিক্ষা-সংযম-শৃঙ্খলা (Education-Restraint-Discipline)
- Authority: Bangladesh Air Force
- Grades: KG to 12th
- Gender: co-ed
- Enrollment: 25,000+
- Language: Bengali and English
- Colors: Uniform: Boys: Sky blue Khaki; Girls: Sky blue White
- Sports: Football, cricket, squash, basketball, volleyball, table tennis, hockey, badminton, handball, and more
- Affiliation: Ministry of Education (Bangladesh)
- Website: BAF Shaheen Colleges

BAF Shaheen College (Bengali: বিএএফ শাহীন কলেজ) is the general name of several civilian secondary and higher secondary educational institutions run by the Bangladesh Air Force (BAF). These educational institutions are located in different BAF bases.

== Colleges ==
There are several BAF Shaheen Colleges across the country.

=== BAF Shaheen College Dhaka ===
BAF Shaheen College Dhaka (Bengali: বিএএফ শাহীন কলেজ ঢাকা) is a co-educational Bangladeshi college (grades KG-XII) established and controlled by the Bangladesh Air Force and primarily for the children of Air Force personnel. But students from the civilian section can also study at the college. The institution was established by Pakistan Air Force near Tejgaon Airport, East Pakistan now Jahangir Gate, Dhaka Cantonment, Dhaka, Bangladesh on 1 March 1960 for the children of the Air Force personnel as Shaheen School, an English-medium school. In 1967, Bengali medium was introduced along with English medium. Since the Bangladesh Liberation War in 1971, BAF has been running this educational institution. Meanwhile, Shaheen School was renamed as "Shaheen High School" and within a few years was recognized by the Dhaka Education Board. In the academic year 1977-78 Shaheen High School was renamed "BAF Shaheen College Dhaka" for the purpose of upgrading it to a higher secondary college. Degree (pass course) was introduced in the academic year 1990-91 and since then BAF Shaheen College Dhaka continues to function as a degree college. However, the degree was abolished from the academic year 2006–07. At present, the college conducts educational programs from infant to class 12 as per the rules of the Directorate of Primary Education, Directorate of Secondary and Higher Education, and Board of Intermediate and Secondary Education, Dhaka. Co-curricular activities are running here. In the academic year 2006, English version was introduced along with Bengali medium according to the educational policy of the National Curriculum and Textbook Board.

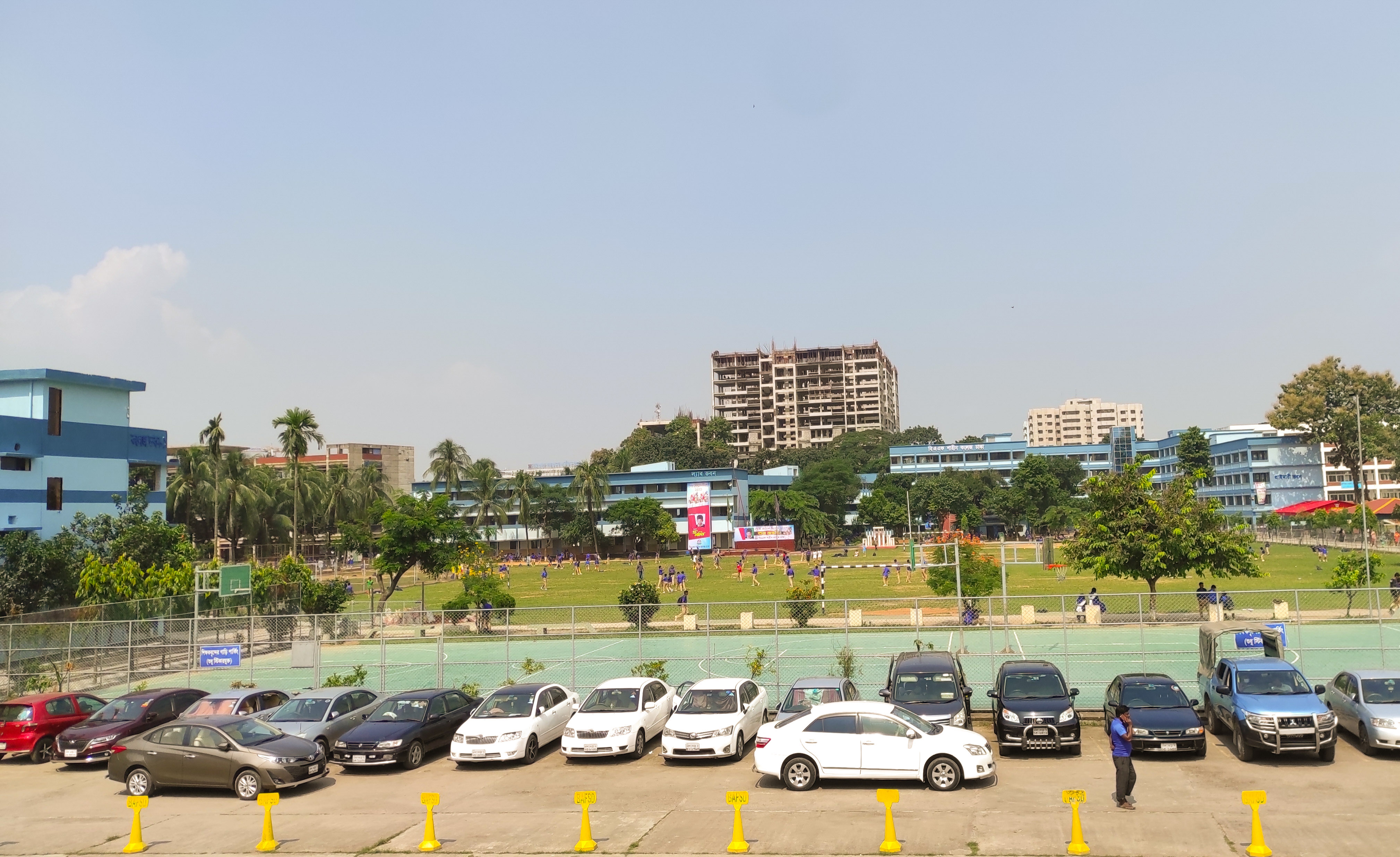
One side of BAF Shaheen College Dhaka Campus

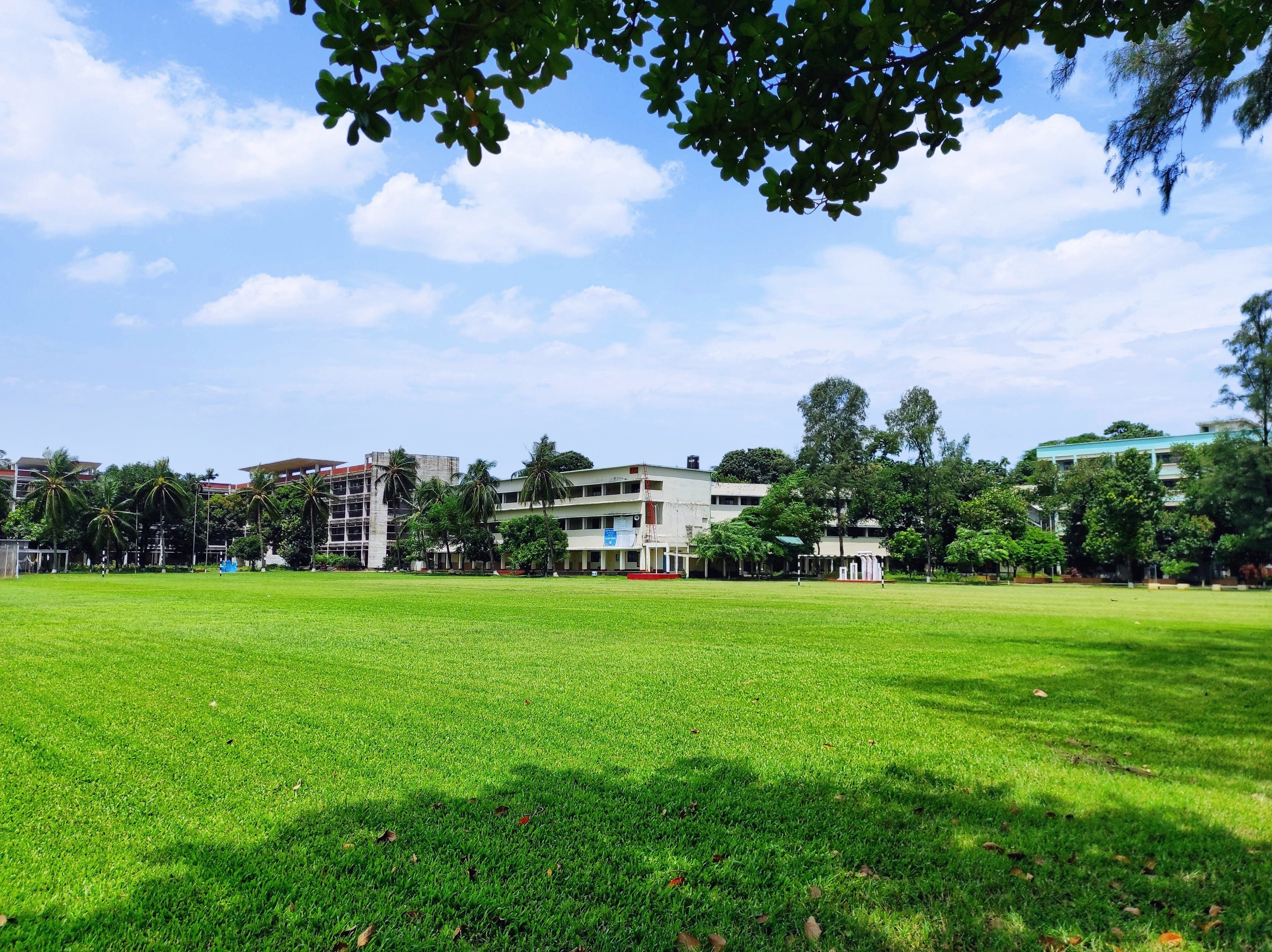
BAF Shaheen College Dhaka Playground

=== BAF Shaheen College Kurmitola ===
BAF Shaheen College Kurmitola was established in 1972 as the "Air Force School." It was renamed "BAF Shaheen School" in 1980. In 1982, the college section was introduced, and the institution was renamed "BAF Shaheen College Kurmitola." Since then, it has grown into a reputed non-residential academic institution managed by the Bangladesh Air Force under the supervision of the Ministry of Education (Bangladesh) and the Dhaka Education Board. The English version section of the institution started in 2010 for classes up to Grade V. In 2015, it was expanded to Grade X. A new college building was constructed in 2019, which now houses both Bengali and English medium college branches.

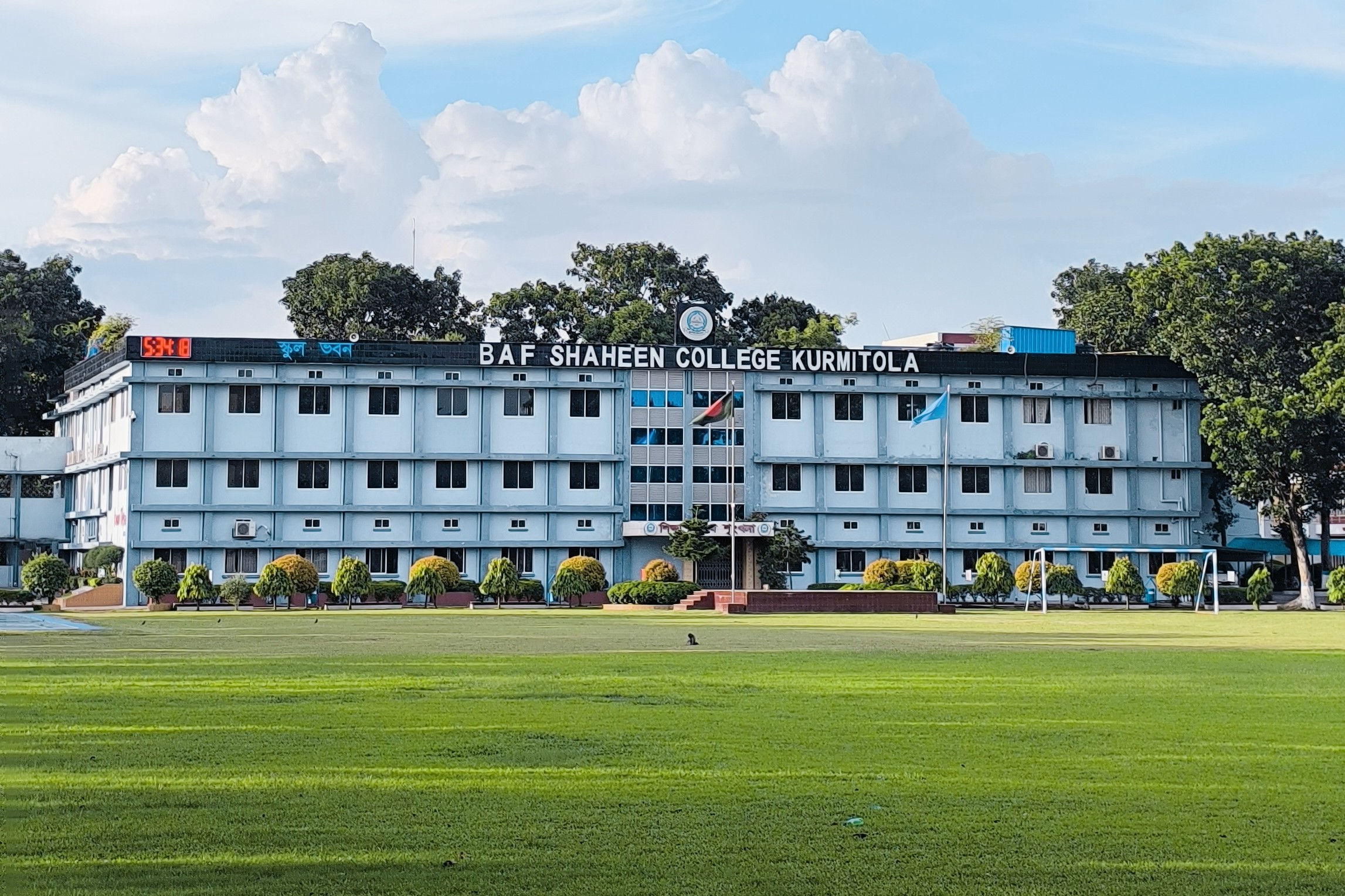
Front view of BAF Shaheen College Kurmitola.

The college is situated within Bangladesh Air Force Base Bir Uttam A. K. Khandker, located in Kurmitola, Dhaka Cantonment, and lies adjacent to the runway of Hazrat Shahjalal International Airport. The campus includes a school building, a college building, an English version school, a playground, a cafeteria, and a Shaheed Minar.

=== BAF Shaheen College Chattogram ===
BAF Shaheen College Chattogram was established in 1978 by Bangladesh Air Force as per the rules and regulations of Ministry of Education of the Government of People's Republic of Bangladesh and Secondary Education Board Chittagong. This school was upgraded to Higher Secondary from the session 1985–86. From the year 2006 English curriculum under NCTB has been introduced as one section each of the classes from II to V along with the existing Bangla curriculum.

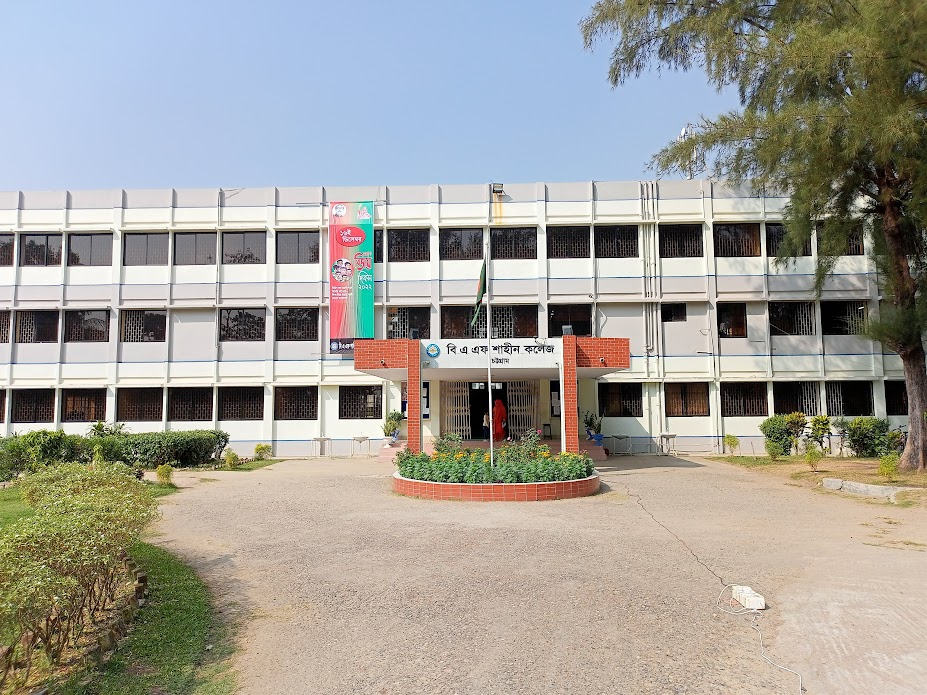
Front view of BAF Shaheen College Chattogram

=== BAF Shaheen College Shamshernagar ===
BAF Shaheen College Shamshernagar was established in 2011 with 1000 students in 6 classes from KG to class VI. The school opened a new class every year up to XII in 2013. The school has preliminary permission from the education board in Sylhet to run the education activities of classes VI to XII. It is now a college. About 2118 students study there in 48 sections.

=== BAF Shaheen College Jashore ===
On 26 January 1976, the foundation was laid in Jashore for what was then called Satadal School. Three years later it was renamed BAF Shaheen School. It was upgraded to a college and renamed BAF Shaheen College Jessore (up to class XII) in 1984. In 2018 The college with other Institute in Jashore had change its name so that the district named changed and became BAF Shaheen College Jashore.

=== BAF Shaheen College Paharkanchanpur ===
BAF Shaheen School, PKP began in 1997 with 51 students in three classes from KG to class II. The school opened a new class every year up to class VIII in 2003. The school has preliminary permission from the education board in Dhaka to run the education activities of classes VI to VIII. Now it teaches until higher secondary. In 2014, the first batch attend to HSC examination under Dhaka education board.

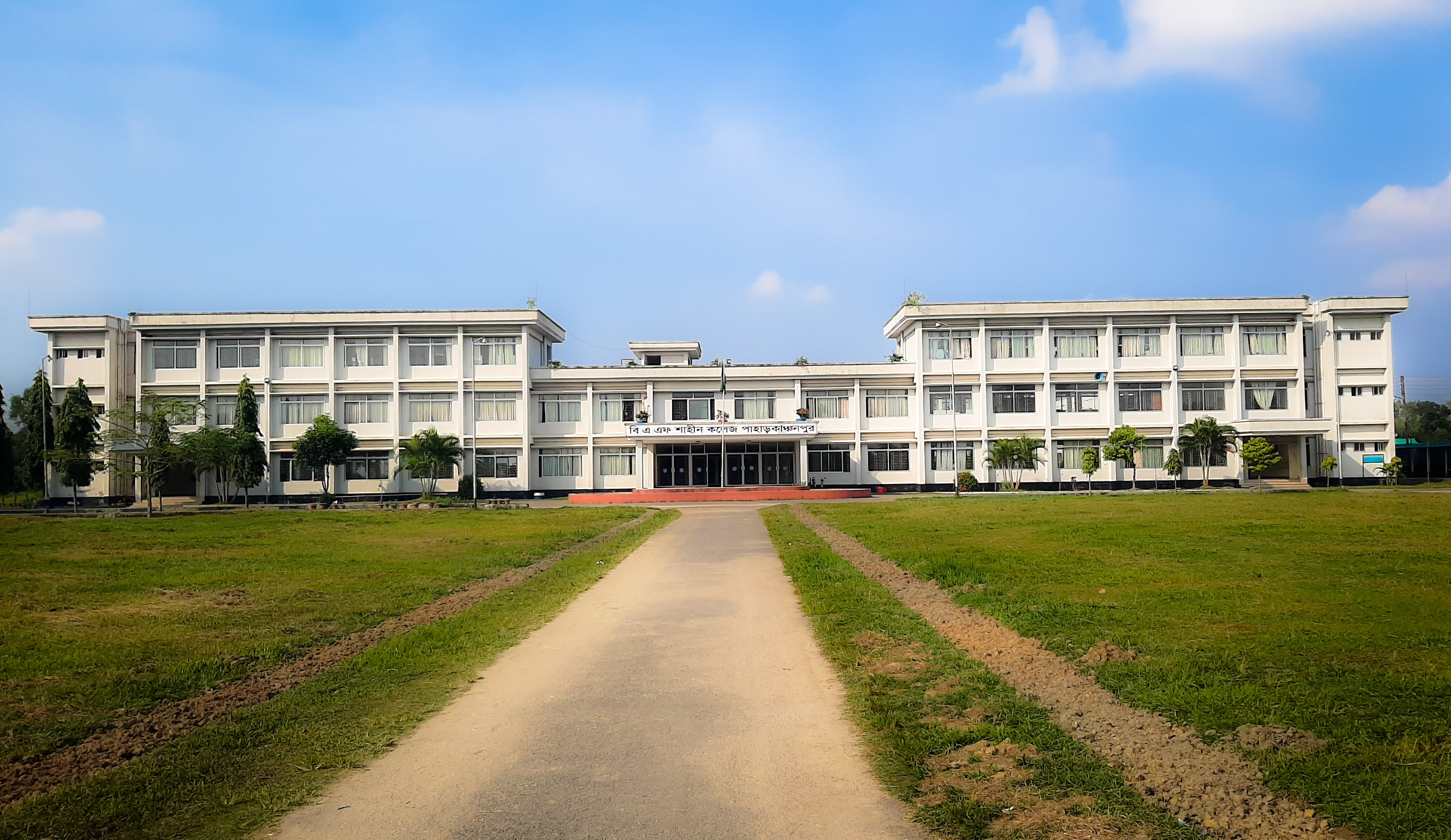
BAF Shaheen College Paharkanchanpur

=== BAF Shaheen English Medium College ===
BAF Shaheen English Medium College (Bengali: বিএএফ শাহীন ইংলিশ মিডিয়াম কলেজ), or commonly known as BAF SEMC - is a college in Dhaka Cantonment, Dhaka, Bangladesh. Its education is based on Cambridge International Examinations of UK under the direct supervision of the Bangladesh Air Force. From the year 1998, BAF SEMS' students have started sitting for the O'Level exam under University of London. It is located next to the BAF Shaheen College Dhaka. As the school began offering higher education (A level) in 2019, the name of the institution changed from BAF Shaheen English Medium School (BAF SEMS) to BAF Shaheen English Medium College (BAF SEMC). As of October 2020, there are around 1600 students enrolled in grades I through XII as a whole. From June 2022 sessions on, BAF SEMC began serving as an exam venue for the British Council Bangladesh for Cambridge school examinations.

=== BAF Shaheen College Bogura ===
BAF Shaheen College Bogura is a privatized educational institution run by the Bangladesh Air Force. The inaugural ceremony of BAF Shaheen College Bogura was held on 1 January 2020 and the youngest of BAF Shaheen College Family.

=== BAF Blue Sky School ===
The school for special needs children, 'BAF Blue Sky School' run by the Bangladesh Air Force (BAF), was inaugurated at the BAF Base Bashar in Dhaka on 13 May 2024.

Jatiya Sangsad Speaker Shirin Sharmin Chaudhury chaired the inauguration ceremony while BAF Chief of Air Staff Air Chief Marshal Shaikh Abdul Hannan was also present on the occasion. In collaboration with the government's initiatives for autistic and special needs children, the BAF established this School through concerted efforts.

=== BAF Shaheen Haji Ashraf Ali School, Kafrul ===
BAF Shaheen Haji Ashraf Ali School (Bengali: বিএফ শাহিন হাজী আশরাফ আলী স্কুল) is an educational institution in East Shewrapara, Kafrul, Dhaka, managed by the Bangladesh Air Force (BAF). Originally founded in 1997 as Hazi Asraf Ali High School, it was later taken over by the BAF and renamed in honor of Haji Ashraf Ali.

The school functions under the supervision of the Bangladesh Air Force and adheres to the Shaheen motto, “Education – Patience – Discipline.” It is a co-educational institution that runs in multiple shifts. Its official EIIN (Educational Institute Information Number) is 108046.
