= National Education Week =

Education programme in Bangladesh

National Education Week (Bengali: জাতীয় শিক্ষা সপ্তাহ) is an annual education-related program held in Bangladesh. It aims to encourage students' talents, creativity, and participation in co-curricular activities. The program is usually organized under the supervision of the Ministry of Education and managed by the Directorate of Secondary and Higher Education (DSHE).

On the occasion of National Education Week, various cultural and educational competitions are organized in educational institutions across the country. In these competitions, students participate at the institutional, upazila, district, and national levels, and winners are selected accordingly.

The objective of this program is to develop students' talents, promote cultural activities, and enrich the educational environment.

== Types of competitions ==
Various types of competitions are usually held during National Education Week, such as:

- Qirat (Qur’anic recitation)
- Hamd
- Naat
- Bangla essay competition
- English essay competition
- English speech competition
- Bangla poetry recitation
- Extempore speech (individual)
- Patriotic song
- Rabindra Sangeet
- Nazrul Sangeet
- Classical music
- Folk music (Bhawaiya, Bhatiali, Palli Geeti, Lalon Geeti)
- Jari song (group)
- Prepared speech
- Classical dance
- Folk dance
- Instant acting
- Wall magazine

== Organization ==
The National Education Week program is organized in educational institutions across the country under the Ministry of Education, with the cooperation of the relevant education directorates and local education administration.
