= Mukul =

Mukul is an Indian/South-Asian given name, which means "blossoming".

Mukul may refer to:

== Given name ==
- Mukul Sharma, Sydney based hotelier, hospitality professional
- Mukul Chadda, Indian actor
- Mukul Chowdhury, Bangladeshi lyricist and musical artist
- Mukul Deora, Indian film producer, musician, conceptual artist and entrepreneur
- Mukul Dev, Indian artist, actor in films, TV serials and in music albums
- Mukul Deva, Indian English author
- Mukul Dey, Bengali-Indian artist and pioneer of drypoint-etching in India
- Mukul Kesavan, Indian writer and essayist
- Mukul Roy, Bengali-Indian politician and member of Parliament
- Mukul Sangma, Indian politician
- Mukul Shivputra, Indian classical vocalist
- Mukul Wasnik, Indian politician and minister

== Family name ==
- M. R. Akhtar Mukul, Bengali author and journalist

== Others ==
- Mukul Niketon School, a private school in Mymensingh District, Dhaka, Bangladesh
