= Siddheswari Boys' High School =

Siddheswari Boys Higher Secondary School
- সিদ্ধেশ্বরী বালক উচ্চ মাধ্যমিক বিদ্যালয়

Location
- 77 Siddheswari; Ramna, Dhaka, 1217; Bangladesh; 23.74502°N 90.41063°E

Information
- Former name: Siddheshwari Boys' Higher Secondary School
- School type: Public, higher secondary school
- Motto: পড় তোমার প্রভুর নামে (Read in the name of God)
- Established: January 1, 1933; 93 years ago
- School code: 108361
- Chairman: জনাব মো: মশিউর রহমান, সচিব, সড়ক পরিবহন ও সেতু মন্ত্রণালয়।
- Headmaster: Mohammad Shamsuddin
- Staff: 40
- Faculty: 23
- Classes: kg^{th} through 10^{th}
- Gender: Boys only
- Enrollment: 739 (2019)
  - Grade 6: 180
  - Grade 7: 180
  - Grade 8: 179
  - Grade 9: 200
- Colors: Navy Blue and White
- Sports: Football; cricket; athletics; basketball; badminton

Siddheswari Boys' Higher Secondary School (Bengali: সিদ্ধেশ্বরী বালক উচ্চ মাধ্যমিক বিদ্যালয়) is one of the oldest public schools in Dhaka, Bangladesh. It was established in 1933. It is in Ramna, one of the most important and largest thanas of Dhaka.

== History ==
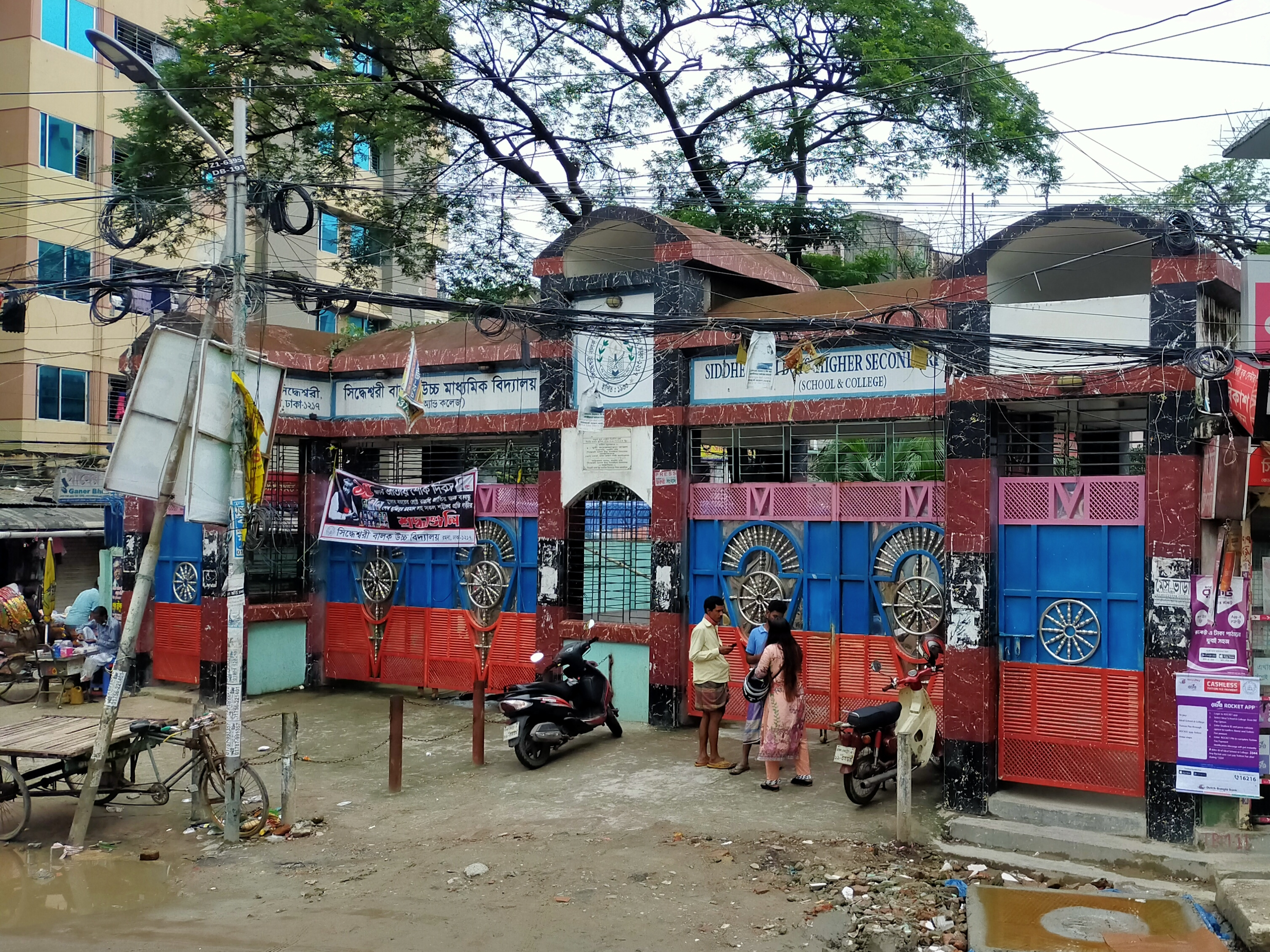
Siddheswari Boys' High School Main Gate, Dhaka

The number of students began to fall starting in the 1990s, and in 2000 the school lacked students and qualified teachers. In 2000 around 19 students appeared at the SSC board examination. In 2010 the school had 20 teachers.

== Extracurricular activities ==
The school has a dedicated sports teacher. Each year it arranges cultural activities in the student farewell ceremony for those who will attend the SSC examination. The school also participates in many activities such as parade, cricket and football tournaments.

== Achievements ==
Siddheswari Boys' Higher Secondary School became the Ramna Thana champion in the inter-school football tournament in 2000.

== See also ==
- Education in Bangladesh
- List of schools in Bangladesh
