= Non-government Teachers and Employees Welfare Trust =

State-Owned Trust in Bangladesh

- Abbreviation: NGTEWT
- Formation: 1990
- Headquarters: Dhaka, Bangladesh
- Region served: Bangladesh
- Official language: Bengali
- Website: www.ngte-welfaretrust.gov.bd

The Non-government Teachers and Employees Welfare Trust (Bengali: বেসরকারি শিক্ষা প্রতিষ্ঠান শিক্ষক ও কর্মচারী কল্যাণ ট্রাস্ট) is a trust owned by the government of Bangladesh for the benefit of teachers and employees of the private sector educational institutions. The chairperson of the trust is Md. Sohorab Hossain. It along with Non-Government Teacher Employee Retirement Benefit Board looks after the pension funds of non-government academics.

== History ==
Qudrat-e-Khuda Education Commission formed by President Sheikh Mujibur Rahman to establish a trust for the welfare of non-government teachers. The plans were shelved after the assassination of Sheikh Mujibur Rahman and following change of government.

On 6 May 2012, the trust started online application process for pensions.

Non-Government Teachers and Employees Welfare Trust was established through the passage of Non-Government Educational Institutions (Teachers and Employees) Welfare Trust Act in 1990. It started operations from 1 July 1990 but stopped operations from 1991 to 1997 when it restarted operations. The trust has provided 2.7 billion taka of support to teachers.

On 8 November 2018, Prime Minister Sheikh Hasina granted 100 million taka to the trust. In December 2018, before the 11th national elections in Bangladesh there were rumours that the government had paid teachers, who act as polling agents, through a check to the trust. The government refuted the allegations said that the trust only provides funds to retired teachers.

Non government teachers contribute six percent of their salaries to the trust for a retirement fund that will be available to them after retirement and with additional funding from the government of Bangladesh. In April 2019, the government increased it to ten percent which was protested by the Bangladesh Shikkhak Union, a teachers union. The government tried to increase contribution to ten percent in 2017.

In October 2020, the Daily Sun reported that over 42 thousand applicants were waiting to get their pension approved by the trust and the Non-Government Employee Retirement Benefits Board. Md. Shahjahan Alam Saju, secretary principal and member of the trust, reported that they do not have enough funds for pay for all the liabilities including pensions and requested 10 billion taka from the Ministry of Education to overcome the deficit.
