= National Academy for Computer Training and Research =

Research institute in Bangladesh

National Academy for Computer Training and Research (NACTAR)
- Formation: 2005
- Headquarters: Bogura, Bangladesh
- Region served: Bangladesh
- Official language: Bengali
- Website: National Academy for Computer Training and Research (NACTAR)

The National Academy for Computer Training and Research (NACTAR) is an autonomous government owned education and research institute in Bangladesh and is located in Bogura, Bangladesh. It is under the Ministry of Education.

== History ==
The previous name of this academy was NTRAMS which stands for "National Training and Research Academy for Multilingual Shorthand" . It was established in 1984, at Bogra, for developing Secretarial Science and business management education system in Bangladesh. NACTAR, which stands for "National Academy for Computer Training and Research (NACTAR)". It is Established after the NTRAMS abolished in 2005. It is an autonomous institution under the ministry of education, the People's Republic of Bangladesh.

National Academy for Computer Training and Research (NACTAR) was established in 2005 through the passage of an act in parliament. The same year previous organisation National Training and Research Academy for Multilingual Shorthand had its declaration cancelled.
