= National Training and Research Academy for Multilingual Shorthand =

Bangladeshi research institute

- Formation: 1982
- Headquarters: Dhaka, Bangladesh
- Region served: Bangladesh
- Official language: Bengali
- Website: National Training and Research Academy for Multilingual Shorthand

The National Training and Research Academy for Multilingual Shorthand (NTRAMS) is an autonomous government institute that provides human resource, lingual, and management courses in Fultola, Bogra, Bangladesh.

== History ==
The academy was founded in 1982 by the government of Bangladesh as an autonomous institution under the Ministry of Education. It has provided 1600 students with computer-based training since 1989. It is headed by a government officer with the rank of a joint secretary. It provides training to both government and non-government officers.
