= Sarwar Hossain =

Bangladeshi general

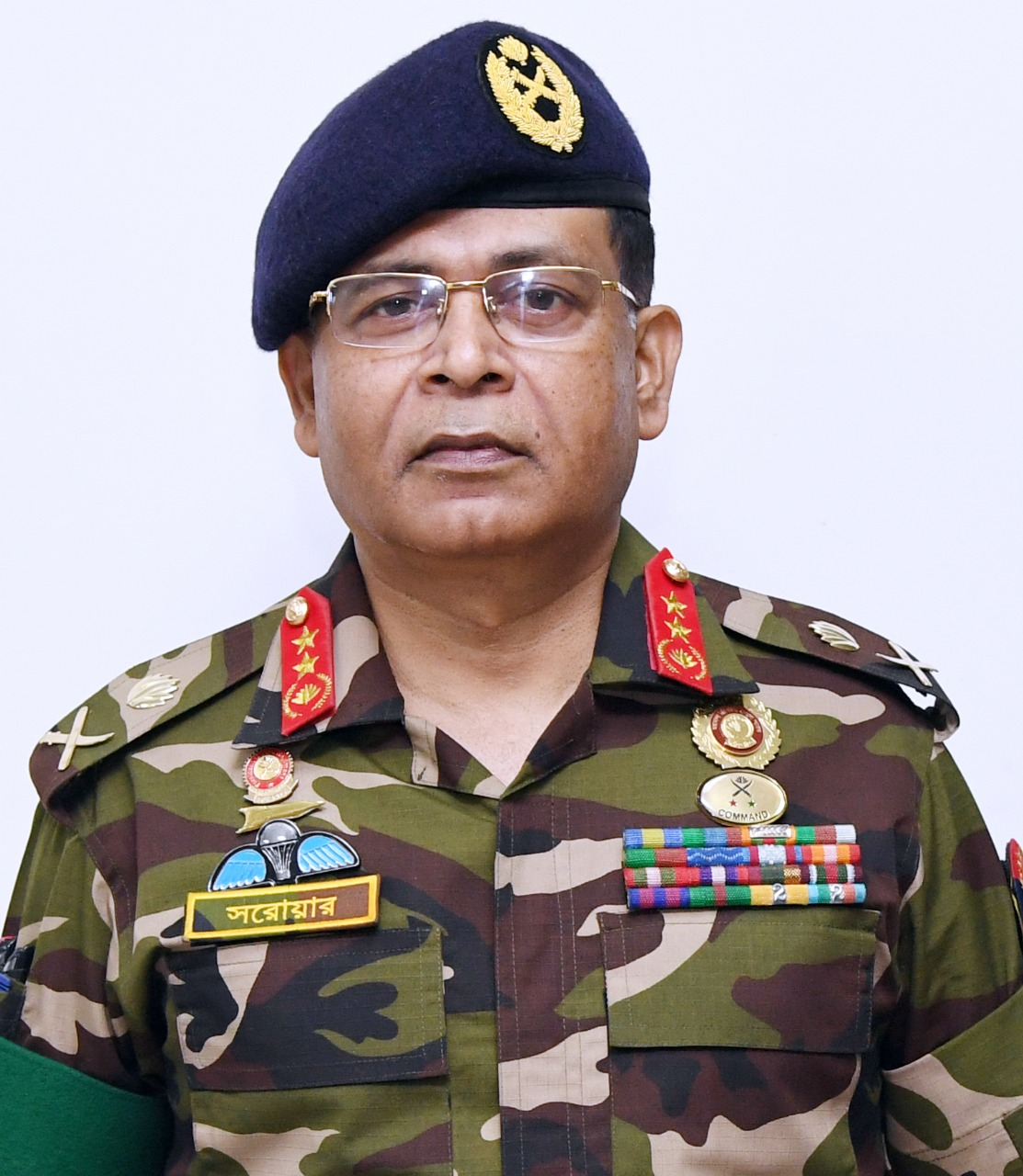
- Hossain in 2019
- Born: 16 January 1966 (age 60); Dacca, East Pakistan, Pakistan
- Military career
- Allegiance: Bangladesh
- Branch: Bangladesh Army
- Service years: 1986–2020
- Rank: Major General
- Unit: East Bengal Regiment
- Commands: CO of 4th East Bengal Regiment; Commander of 305th Infantry Brigade; Director of Internal Affairs Bureau; Military Secretary to President
- Conflicts: UNIKOM; ONUCI

Sarwar Hossain (Bengali: সারওয়ার হোসেন; born 16 January 1966) is a retired Bangladeshi major general who was former military secretary to the president of Bangladesh.

== Early life and education ==
Hossain studied at BAF Shaheen College Kurmitola and Adamjee Cantonment College. Hossain enlisted in the Bangladesh Military Academy in 1984 and was commissioned with 15 BMA Long Course in East Bengal Regiment in December 1986. He completed his master's degree in management from the University of Hyderabad. Hossain furthermore has completed his PhD in Bangladesh Liberation War from the University of Dhaka in 2018.

== Military career ==
Hossain commanded one infantry company, one infantry battalion, and one infantry brigade in Rangamati. He was also the principal of Military Collegiate School Khulna in 2014.

Hossain served as director of the internal affairs bureau of the DGFI till 2016. In November 2016, he succeeded Major General Abul Hossain as military secretary to the President. Hossain's writing career started with his first book, titled Random Thoughts, and was an emphasis collection of several articles on diverse issues. He also authored 1971: Resistance, Resilience, and Redemption, a work on the liberation war of Bangladesh, published in 2019. In November 2020, he was sent to mandatory retirement due to a motion of disrepute and was succeeded by Major General S. M. Salahuddin Islam on 3 December 2020. In his post-military career, Hossain was appointed an independent director of Simtex Industries Limited on 17 August 2022. Currently he is serving as the chairman of AFC Health Limited, a private hospital conglomerate, and also an adjunct faculty member at North South University.

== Controversies ==
In September 2024, a complaint was filed with the International Crimes Tribunal of Bangladesh, accusing him, along with former chief of army staff General Shafiuddin Ahmed and Lieutenant General Mohammad Akbar Hossain of involvement in enforced disappearances and extrajudicial killings.

Preceded by Abul Hossain	Military Secretary to the President of Bangladesh; 2019-2020	Succeeded by S. M. Salahuddin Islam
