= Baridhara Scholars Institution =

School in Baridhara, Dhaka, Bangladesh

Coordinates: 23.8157°N 90.4124°E

Baridhara Scholars' International School and College was established on 1 January 2001. It follows the Edexcel curriculum, and is located in Baridhara DOHS. The school is run by the Bangladesh Army. After the principal change in 2018, The institution was renamed as Baridhara Scholars' International School & College (BSISC). It is situated at Baridhara DOHS in Dhaka-1206. It has classes from nursery to class XII. It has photography, dancing, singing, debate, general knowledge, English language, sports and many other clubs, it also has a football and hand ball team.
