= Department of Inspection and Audit =

- Formation: 1980
- Headquarters: Dhaka, Bangladesh
- Region served: Bangladesh
- Official language: Bengali
- Website: www.dia.gov.bd

Department of Inspection and Audit is a Bangladesh government regulatory agency under the Ministry of Education.

== History ==
The Department of Inspection and Audit traces its origin to a high powered committee formed in 1979 and led by Kazi Anwarul Haque. The purpose of the committee was to examine the education sector and provide recommendations for improvement. It recommended the establishment of a pay scale for private sector schools to end a discrepancy between the wages of private and public sector teachers. The government decided to approve the separate pay scale of private teachers from 1 January 1980. The committee had also recommended the formation of Directorate of Inspection and Control to monitor the distribution of funds and quality control in the private education sector. Accordingly, the government of Bangladesh created the Department of Inspection and Audit under the Ministry of Education on 1 October 1980. It was modelled after Her Majesty's Inspectorate of Education in Scotland.
