= Secondary and Higher Education Division =

- Abbreviation: SHED
- Formation: 2016
- Headquarters: Dhaka, Bangladesh
- Region served: Bangladesh
- Official language: Bengali
- Minister of Education: A. N. M. Ehsanul Hoque Milan
- Secretary: Abdul Khaleque
- Budget: ৳57302 crore (US$4.7 billion) (2026-2027)
- Website: shed.gov.bd

Secondary and Higher Education Division (মাধ্যমিক ও উচ্চ শিক্ষা বিভাগ) is a Bangladesh government division under the Ministry of Education responsible for secondary and higher education in Bangladesh. It is the highest policy making body concerning secondary and tertiary education in Bangladesh. It is responsible for overseeing 25,227 high schools, 37 public universities, and 92 private universities. Abdul Khaleque is the secretary of the division.

== History ==
On 30 November 2016, the government of Bangladesh divided the Education Ministry into two divisions, the Secondary and Higher Education Division and the Technical and Madrasah Education Division.
