= Directorate of Madrasha Education =

Bangladeshi governmental directorate

- Formation: 2015
- Headquarters: Dhaka, Bangladesh
- Region served: Bangladesh
- Official language: Bengali
- Website: dme.gov.bd

The Directorate of Madrasha Education is a Bangladesh government department under the Ministry of Education responsible for overseeing more than 20 thousand madrasas in Bangladesh.

== History ==
The Directorate of Madrasha Education was established on 1 July 2015.

The Directorate of Madrasha Education requested the Directorate of Secondary and Higher Education to remove teachers involved in the murder of Nusrat Jahan Rafi from the monthly pay order.

In March 2020, Ebtedayee madrasa teachers demanded the Directorate of Madrasha Education nationalise their jobs. Shafiuddin Ahmed, Director General of the Directorate of Madrasha Education, assured them their demands would be taken into consideration. The directorate failed to provide information on how many educational institutions under it had established the mandated sexual harassment prevention committees.

The directorate launched a clean up operation in August 2023 targeting corruption in madrasas. In December 2024, the Directorate of Madrasha Education developed a transfer policy for madrasa teachers similar to existing ones for school and college teachers.
