= Mirpur Government High School =

- মিরপুর সরকারি উচ্চ বিদ্যালয়

Location
- Mirpur-1, Dhaka-1216; Bangladesh; 23.7994°N 90.3522°E

Information
- Former name: Bengali Medium High School
- School type: Government
- Motto: জ্ঞানই আলো English : Knowledge is light
- Established: 1963
- School board: Dhaka Board
- School district: Dhaka
- School number: 108185
- Headmaster: MD.Jalal Uddin Sarkar
- Teaching staff: 53
- Grades: Class 3 to 10 (For girls) Class 5 to 10 (For boys)
- Gender: For Girls & Boys
- Enrollment: 2000
- Student to teacher ratio: 60:1 (students:teacher)
- Language: Bangla
- Campus: 115 acres (47 ha)
- Website: mirpurghs.edu.bd

Mirpur Government High School (Bengali: মিরপুর সরকারি উচ্চ বিদ্যালয়) is a secondary school in Mirpur Shah Ali thana, Dhaka, Bangladesh. It was established in 1963 and was known as Bengali Medium School until it later became a government high school and gets its present name Mirpur Government High School (MGHS) in 1983.

== History ==
The school was established as the Bengali Medium School (বেঙ্গলী মিডিয়াম স্কুল) during the East Pakistan era in 1963. Bengali Medium School was involved in the Bengali language movement, a key forerunner to the Bangladesh Liberation War.

The school came under government control under the Ershad regime, and was given its present name.

== Academics ==
Mirpur Government High School is the only government high school in the greater Mirpur area. The school operates a double shift, with girls attending in the morning (7:00 AM to 12:00 noon) and boys in the afternoon (12:30 noon to 5:15 PM). There is also a multimedia room and ICT lab for study. It ranked 358th in national school ranking.

== Campus ==
Mirpur Government High School stands on a 115-acre (47 ha) campus. It consists of one two-storey building constructed in 1963, a newer five-storey building, and a separate building housing a common room.

== Groups ==
There are three groups in this school. Namely- Science, Commerce & Arts.

== Admissions and fees ==
In order to be admitted into this school one has to sit for examination. Since it is a government school, it follows all criteria given from the Board of Dhaka.
