= National Ideal College =

Location
- Khilgaon, Dhaka (near Taltola Market); Bangladesh
- Coordinates: 23.7503°N 90.4252°E

Information
- Type: Private
- Motto: Read! In the name of thy Rabb
- Established: 1939
- Principal: Md. Maksud Uddin
- Grades: 11-12
- Gender: Boys & Girls
- Language: Bengali version
- Campus type: Apartment
- Colors: White and Black

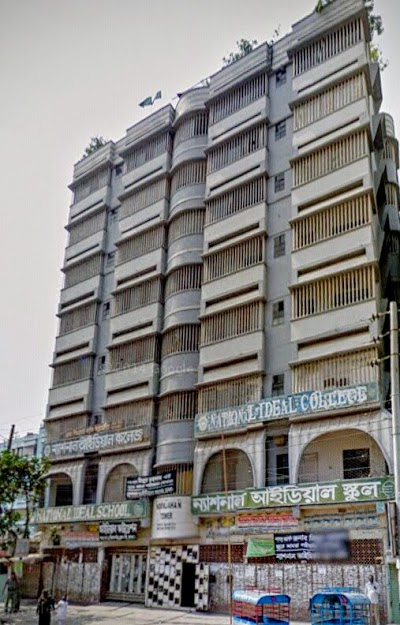
Main building of the college in Khilgaon

National Ideal College (NIC) (Bengali: ন্যাশনাল আইডিয়াল কলেজ) is a higher secondary institution in Khilgaon Thana, Dhaka, Bangladesh. It was founded by ideal foundation in 1939.

National Ideal College provides education for Science, Commerce and Humanities division and for both boys and girls. Classes are held at the apartment building. The college has several buildings in Khilgaon. It is participating in HSC examination since 2002.

Despite the college's success in HSC examination since its establishment, it has been criticized for suspending students during the academic year due to continuous poor result in internal exams.

== Co-curricular activities ==
Though the college doesn't have any playground it takes part in the inter-college football tournament every year. In 2016 the college team reached the semifinal of the tournament.

The college has the limitation of not having any facilities for co-curricular activities but still, it occasionally publishes yearbook which is mainly contributed by students of this college.

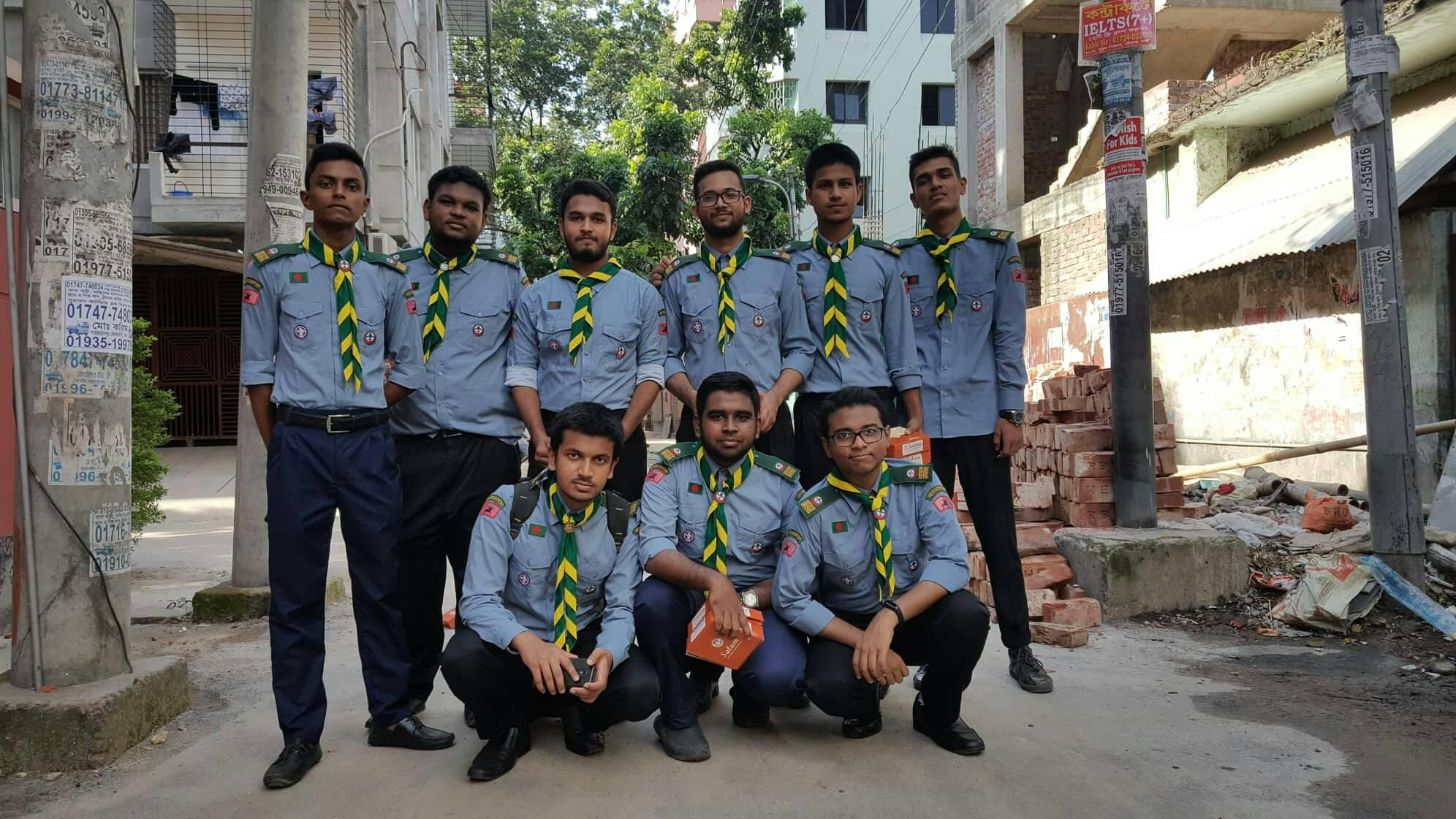

Recently the college has established a rover scout group called "National Ideal College Rover Scout Group" and they are performing various social activities.

== Regulation ==
The college is strict about disciplinary acts. Male students are not allowed to keep hair longer than around 1.5 cm and beard other than for religious reason and in religious style. Female students can not wear any type of ornaments and must keep their hair braided. All students are checked everyday during entry and if the hair, nail and beard is not correct they are denied to participate in class. Students cannot sit in any exam without these desired form of hair, beard and nail.

Bringing mobile phone in the college is completely prohibited for any student. If in any case mobile phone is found to be carried by a student within the college, the phone will be seized on spot.

== Result ==
Despite limitations regarding campus area, extracurricular activities and other facilities National Ideal College has recorded good position in the HSC examination since its establishment. The college placed 4th in 2014 on the list of top 20 colleges in Dhaka Board as per the result of HSC examination. From 2006 to 2014 National Ideal College has secured position on this list every year (the board did not publish such list after 2014).

But many attributes this accomplishment in the HSC examination largely to the high suspension rate of the college as a big chunk of the weak students get suspended during the academic year due to poor result in internal exams.
