= Narayanganj Bar Academy =

- নারায়ণগঞ্জ বার একাডেমী
- Narayanganj Bar Academy

Location
- Khanpur Road; Khanpur, Narayanganj Sadar Upazila; Narayanganj, 1400; Bangladesh
- Coordinates: 23.6264°N 90.5062°E

Information
- Established: 1906
- Founder: Gul Muhammad Adamjee
- School board: Board of Intermediate and Secondary Education, Dhaka
- Authority: Narayanganj Bar Council
- Grades: 2-10
- Age range: 7-18
- Language: Bengali
- Campus: Khanpur, Narayanganj 1400
- Campus type: Urban

Narayanganj Bar Academy (Bengali: নারায়ণগঞ্জ বার একাডেমী) is a Bangladeshi public school located in Narayanganj Sadar Upazila, Bangladesh, primarily for the primary, lower-secondary, and secondary level education for the children of Narayanganj Bar Council members stationed in Narayanganj Sadar; and some pupils come from the civilian sector. The institution is under the supervision of the Narayanganj Bar Council.

== Campus ==
The campus is located in the heart of Narayanganj, adjacent to the 300-bed medical hospital, just opposite the Narayanganj B.R.T.A. (Bangladesh Road and Transport Authority) office. The campus consists of dormitories, staff quarters, an auditorium, an administrative building, and a full-size football field.
