= Panchbibi L. B. Pilot Government High School =

Public secondary school in Panchbibi Upazila, Bangladesh

Panchbibi Lal Bihari Pilot Government High School
- পাঁচবিবি লাল বিহারী পাইলট সরকারি উচ্চ বিদ্যালয়

Location
- Panchbibi Upazila, Joypurhat District; Bangladesh; 25.10°N 89.10°E

Information
- Type: Public Secondary School
- Motto: Learn it and give all
- Established: 1940
- School board: Board of Intermediate and Secondary Education, Rajshahi
- Headmaster: Md. Ataur Rahman
- Grades: 6-10
- Gender: boys
- Age range: 11-16
- Enrollment: 1000
- Colors: White and Navy blue
- Sports: Football, cricket, basketball, volleyball, table tennis, badminton, handball
- Publication: Anushilon (অনুশীলন)
- Website: https://lbphs.gov.bd

Panchbibi Lal Bihari Pilot Government High School (Bengali: পাঁচবিবি লাল বিহারী পাইলট সরকারি উচ্চ বিদ্যালয়) is a secondary school situated in Panchbibi Upazila, Joypurhat District, in northern Bangladesh. It was established in 1940, and nationalized in 1986.
