= Baridhara DOHS =

Neighborhood in Dhaka, Bangladesh

DOHS Baridhara
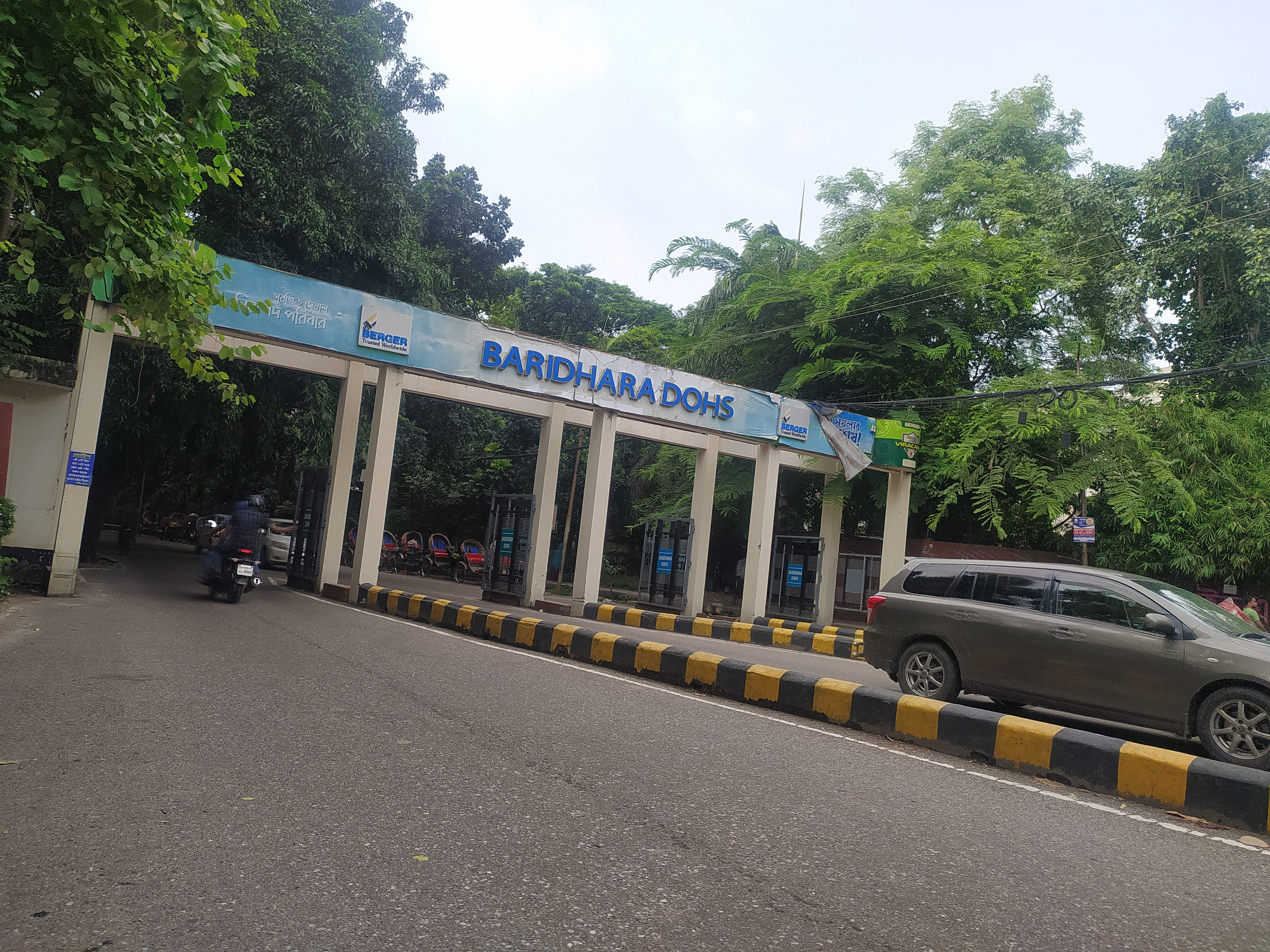
- DOHS Baridhara
- Interactive map of DOHS Baridhara
- Division: Dhaka
- Time zone: BST
- Website: dohsbaridhara.com

Baridhara DOHS is a neighborhood in Baridhara, Dhaka, Bangladesh.

== History ==
It was built on flood plains, which may potentially make the buildings and infrastructure in the area vulnerable to earthquakes. There is a mosque near the lake in Baridhara DOHS. Inspire is a creative space in DOHS where people can practice yoga. Baridhara DOHS Convention Centre is located here.
