= Bangladesh Madrasah Teachers' Training Institute =

Government training institute in Dhaka

- Formation: 1995
- Headquarters: Dhaka, Bangladesh
- Region served: Bangladesh
- Official language: Bengali
- Website: bmtti.gov.bd

Bangladesh Madrasah Teachers' Training Institute is a Bangladesh government training institute under the Ministry of Education responsible for training teachers of Madrasas. It is the only training institute for over 100 thousand madrasa teachers in Bangladesh. There are 2.7 million students in madrasas across Bangladesh.

== History ==
The Mohammad Moniruzzaman Mia Commission Bangladesh Education Commission, Shamsul Haque Education Commission, and the Kabir Chowdhury Education Commission all recommended forming a training institute for madrasa teachers to improve their educational quality in madrasas. The Bangladesh Madrasah Teachers' Training Institute was established in 1995 and provides Bachelor of Madrasah Education degrees.

Madrasa teachers had limited interest in getting a bachelor's degree in education, especially after the government of Bangladesh made the Fazil degree equivalent to a bachelor's degree.
