= Non-Government Teacher Employee Retirement Benefit Board =

Non-Government Employee Retirement Benefits Board
- Abbreviation: NGERBB
- Formation: 2002
- Headquarters: Dhaka, Bangladesh
- Region served: Bangladesh
- Official language: Bengali
- Website: terbb.gov.bd

Non-Government Employee Retirement Benefits Board (Bengali: বেসরকারী শিক্ষা প্রতিষ্ঠান শিক্ষক ও কর্মচারী অবসর সুবিধা বোর্ড) is a Bangladesh government owned board that manages the pensions of non-government teachers along with Non-government Teachers and Employees Welfare Trust.

== History ==
Non-Government Employee Retirement Benefits Board was established in 2002 to provide and manage the pensions of non government teachers. After retirement teachers receive welfare and retirement benefit from the board. According to the rules of the board teachers retire at 60 and can start receiving their benefits. In the event of death the benefits will go to their immediate family.

Bangladesh Shikkhak Union, a teachers union, protested the government order to increase the contribution to the pension fund from six percent of their salary to ten percent in 2019. This move was protested by another union of teachers called National Front of Teachers and Employees when it was first proposed in 2017. Prime Minister Sheikh Hasina provided 100 million taka to the board in November 2018.

In August 2019, Prime Minister Sheikh Hasina provided 250 million taka to the board.

According to a report on 4 October 2020 by the Daily Sun, 42, 433 applications from teachers for their pensions are pending with the Non-Government Employee Retirement Benefits Board and the Non-government Teachers and Employees Welfare Trust. Sharif Ahamed Sadi, Member Secretary of Non-Government Employee Retirement Benefits Board, said that they were unable to provide funds to the retired teachers as they did not have the necessary funds. He said that they needed an additional 10 billion taka from the government of Bangladesh.
