= Mukul Niketon High School =

Mukul Niketon High School, Mymensingh
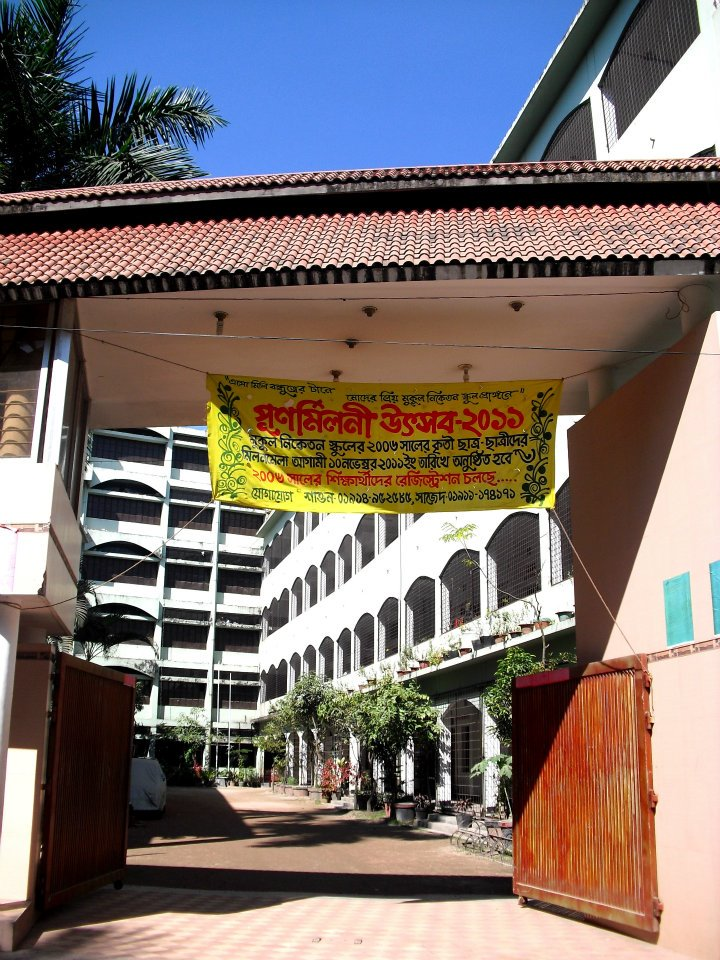
- Mukul Niketon High School

Location
- 10, Moharaza Road, Sadar, Mymensingh; Bangladesh
- Coordinates: 24.7560°N 90.4113°E

Information
- Type: Educational Institution
- Motto: Satya-Sondar-Samya-Shiksha
- Established: 1970
- Founder: Amir Ahammad Chowdhury Ratan
- Headmaster: Md. Shamsul Alam
- Enrollment: 11,000
- Website: mukulniketonhs.edu.bd

Mukul Niketon High School is a private school in Mymensingh District, Bangladesh. The school is located at 10, Moharaza Road which is few minutes walk from Mymensingh Rail Station.

The school plays important role at any kind of natural disaster and national problems. The teachers and students of the school also donated, collected and delivered foods, clothes and other essentials to the flood affected people at 1988 and 1998.

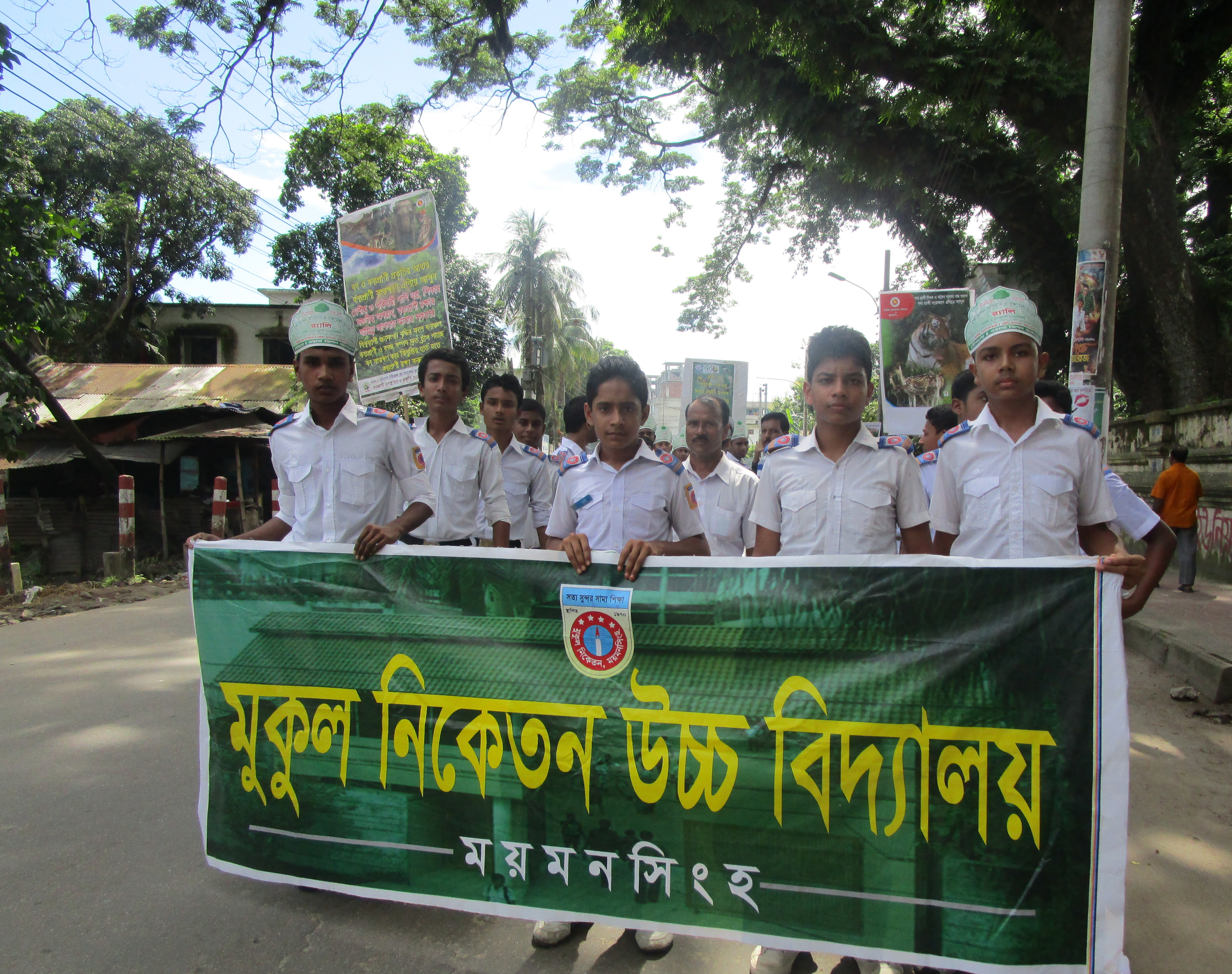
Students rally on Tree Plantation
