= Ministry of Education (Bangladesh) =

Government ministry of Bangladesh

- শিক্ষা মন্ত্রণালয়
- Government Seal of Bangladesh

Ministry overview
- Formed: 16 December 1971; 54 years ago
- Jurisdiction: Government of Bangladesh
- Headquarters: Bangladesh Secretariat, Dhaka
- Annual budget: ৳75759 crore (US$6.2 billion) (2026-2027)
- Minister responsible: A. N. M. Ehsanul Hoque Milan, Minister for Education
- Child agencies: Secondary and Higher Education Division; Technical and Madrasah Education Division
- Website: moedu.gov.bd

The Ministry of Education (Bengali: শিক্ষা মন্ত্রণালয়, romanized: Śikkhā Montronaloy; abbreviated as MoE) is a ministry of the Government of Bangladesh responsible for secondary, higher, and tertiary education. Primary education and mass literacy fall under the separate Ministry of Primary and Mass Education, which oversees primary schools, literacy programs, and nationwide basic education initiatives.

== Departments ==
=== Secondary and Higher Education Division ===
- University Grants Commission of Bangladesh
- Bangladesh Accreditation Council
- Directorate of Secondary and Higher Education
- National Academy for Educational Management (NAEM)
- Education Engineering Department
- Bangladesh Bureau of Educational Information and Statistics (BANBEIS)
- Department of Inspection and Audit
- National Curriculum and Textbook Board (NCTB)
- Non-Government Teachers' Registration and Certification Authority (NTRCA)
- Bangladesh National Commission of UNESCO (BNCU)
- Prime Minister's Education Assistance Trust
- International Mother Language Institute
- Non-Government Teacher Employee Retirement Benefit Board
- Non-government Teachers and Employees Welfare Trust
- Board of Intermediate and Secondary Education, Dhaka
- Board of Intermediate and Secondary Education, Cumilla
- Board of Intermediate and Secondary Education, Dinajpur
- Board of Intermediate and Secondary Education, Rajshahi
- Board of Intermediate and Secondary Education, Barisal
- Board of Intermediate and Secondary Education, Chattogram
- Board of Intermediate and Secondary Education, Sylhet
- Board of Intermediate and Secondary Education, Jashore
- Board of Intermediate and Secondary Education, Mymensingh
- Bangladesh Scouts

=== Technical and Madrasah Education Division ===
- Directorate of Technical Education
- Directorate of Madrasha Education
- Bangladesh Madrasah Teachers' Training Institute (BMTTI)
- Bangladesh Technical Education Board
- National Computer Training and Research Academy (NACTAR)
- Bangladesh Madrasah Education Board

== See also ==
- Non-government Teachers and Employees Welfare Trust
- 2017 Bangladesh textbooks criticism
- Government of Bangladesh
