= Directorate of Secondary and Higher Education =

Bangladesh government Directorate

- Abbreviation: DSHE
- Successor: Directorate of Secondary Education Directorate of College Education
- Formation: 1823; 203 years ago
- Headquarters: Dhaka, Bangladesh
- Region served: Bangladesh
- Official language: Bengali
- Director General (Grade-1): Professor B M Abdul Hannan (Additional Charge)
- Parent organization: Ministry of Education
- Website: www.dshe.gov.bd

The Directorate of Secondary and Higher Education (মাধ্যমিক ও উচ্চশিক্ষা অধিদপ্তর) is a Bangladesh government directorate under the Ministry of Education responsible for improving education standards and access to education. The director general is Muhammad Azad Khan.

== History ==
The Directorate of Secondary and Higher Education traces its origins to the Directorate of Public Instruction, which was formed following the Wood's despatch in 1823. The government of Bangladesh converted the Directorate of Public Instruction to the Directorate of Secondary and Higher Education in 1981. The directorate is responsible for 29,569 educational institutes in Bangladesh.

After the fall of the Sheikh Hasina led Awami League government, Directorate of Secondary and Higher Education ordered the Islamic University, Kushtia to rename all buildings named after Sheikh Hasina and her family members.
