= National Curriculum and Textbook Board =

Education board in Bangladesh

- জাতীয় শিক্ষাক্রম ও পাঠ্যপুস্তক বোর্ড (এনসিটিবি)
- National Curriculum and Textbook Board Logo

Organisation overview
- Formed: 1983
- Preceding agencies: Bangladesh School Textbook Board; National Curriculum Development Centre
- Jurisdiction: Government of Bangladesh
- Employees: 91
- Organisation executives: Professor Robiul Kabir Chowdhury(Routine duty), Chairman; PROFESSOR MD SHATAB UDDIN, Secretary
- Parent department: Ministry of Education
- Website: nctb.gov.bd

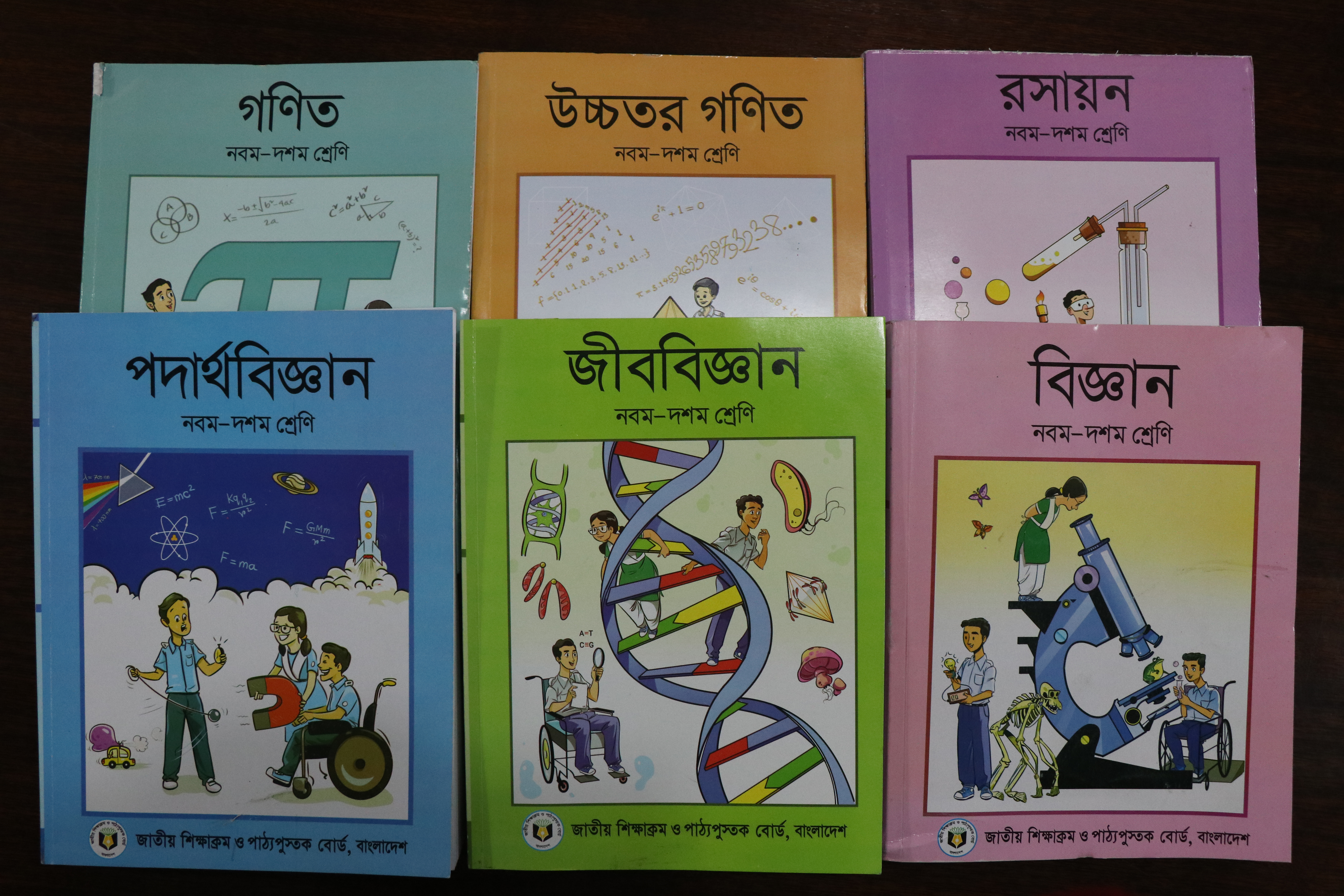
Newly issued NCTB mathematics & science-related books (in Bengali) for grades IX–X, January 2018. Horizontally from top left: Math, Higher Math, Chemistry, Physics, Biology and Science

The National Curriculum and Textbook Board (NCTB; Bengali: জাতীয় শিক্ষাক্রম ও পাঠ্যপুস্তক বোর্ড) is an autonomous organization under the Ministry of Education in Bangladesh, responsible for the development of curriculums, production and distribution of textbooks at primary and secondary education levels in Bangladesh.

All public schools and many private schools in Bangladesh follow the curriculum of NCTB. Starting in 2010, every year free books are distributed to students between Grade-1 to Grade-10 to eliminate illiteracy. These books comprise most of the curricula of the majority of Bangladeshi schools. There are two versions of the curriculum. One is the Bengali language version and the other one is English language version.

== History ==
National Curriculum and Textbook Board (NCTB) traces its origins to the East Pakistan School Textbook Board which was established in 1954. In 1971, the Bangladesh School Textbook Board was established. In 1976, it was constituted as the National Curriculum and Syllabus Committee and the National Curriculum Development Centre was established in 1981. National Curriculum Development Centre and the Bangladesh School Textbook Board were merged in 1983 to form the Bangladesh National Textbook Board which was later renamed to National Curriculum and Textbook Board.

== See also ==
- Education in Bangladesh
