= Government High School for Boys =

Government High School for Boys may refer to:

- Government High School for Boys, Basti Nau,
- Government High School for Boys, Salarwala

== See also ==
- Government High School Jhelum, Punjab, Pakistan
- Govt High School Bhagwal, Punjab, Pakistan
- Government High School Bogray, Punjab, Pakistan
- Government High School Pakkay Wala, Punjab, Pakistan
- Government Laboratory High School, Bangladesh
- Government Muslim High School, Bangladesh
- Annada Government High School, Bangladesh
- Ballygunge Government High School, West Bengal, India
- Barrackpore Government High School, West Bengal, India
- Chittagong Government High School, Bangladesh
- Cox's Bazar Government High School, Bangladesh
- Dhanmondi Government Boys' High School, Bangladesh
- Feni Government Pilot High School, Bangladesh
- Gaibandha Government Boys' High School, Bangladesh
- Harimohon Government High School, Bangladesh
- Hasan Ali Government High School, Bangladesh
- Hazi Mohammad Mohsin Government High School, Bangladesh
- Kishoregonj Government Boys' High School, Bangladesh
- Lakshmipur Adarsha Samad Government High School, Bangladesh
- Manirampur Government High School, Bangladesh
- Mohammadpur Government High School, Bangladesh
- Motijheel Government Boys' High School, Bangladesh
- Naogaon K.D. Government High School, Bangladesh
- Nasirabad Government High School, Bangladesh
- Natore Government Boys High School, Bangladesh
- Nripendra Narayan Government High School, Bangladesh
- Patuakhali Government Jubilee High School, Bangladesh
- Rani Bilashmoni Government Boys' High School, Bangladesh
- Satkhira Government High School, Bangladesh
- Sher-e-Bangla Nagar Government Boys' High School, Bangladesh
- Sylhet Government Pilot High School, Bangladesh
- Government Boys' HS School Ground, Karimganj, India
