= List of schools in Chittagong =

This is a list of schools in the Chittagong Division

Schools located on the island of Sandwip in the Chittagong District of the Chittagong Division are included in a separate list at List of schools in Sandwip.

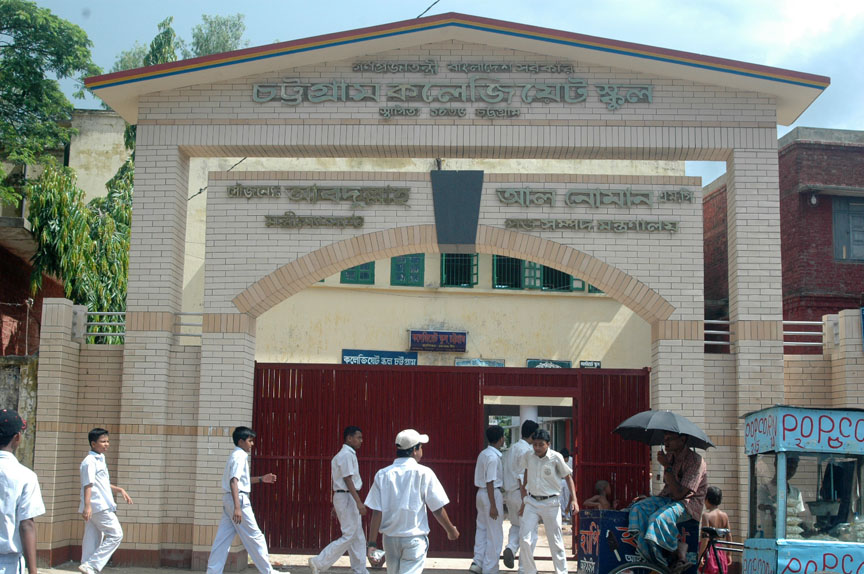
Chittagong Collegiate School and College

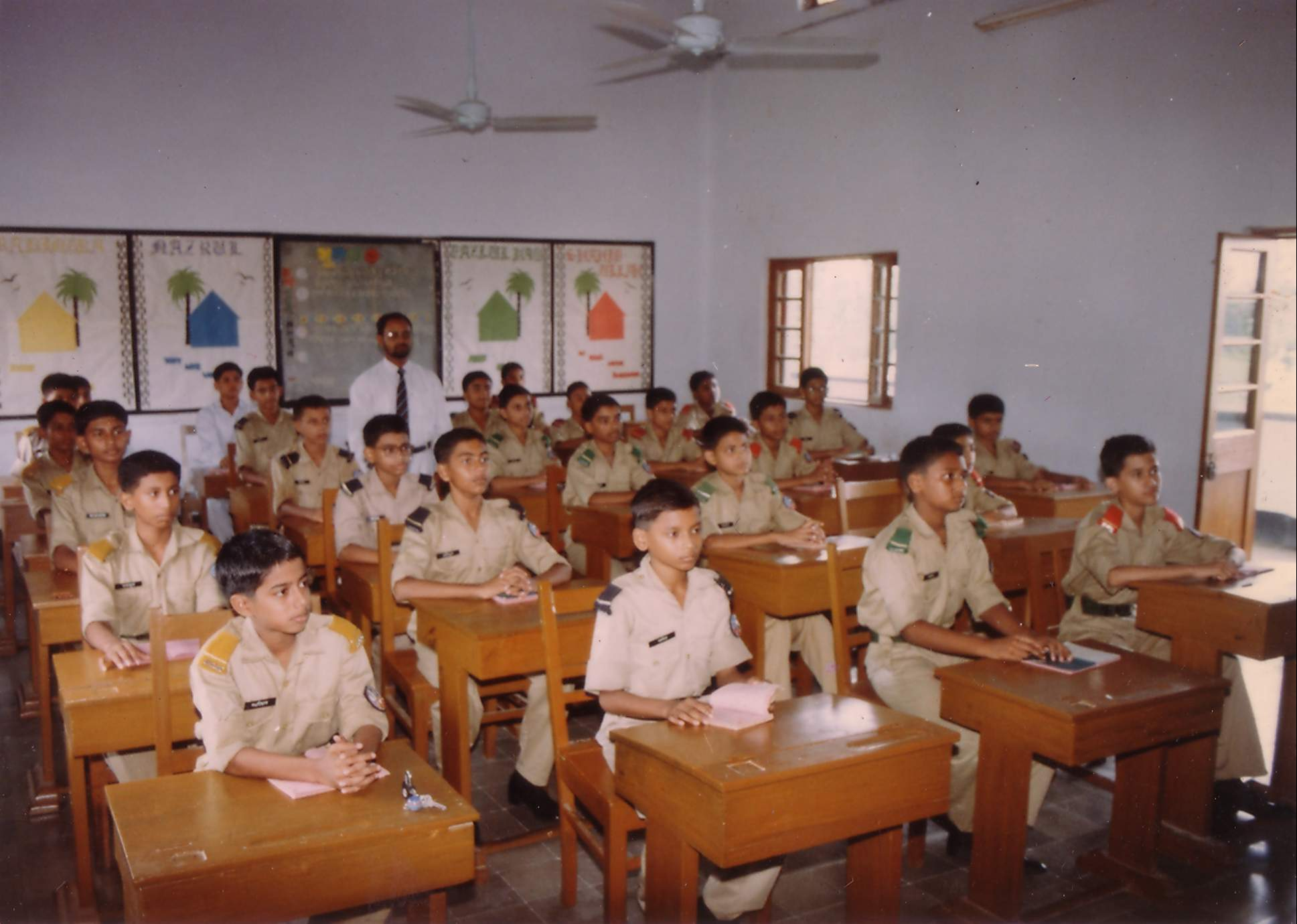
Cadets in class room, Faujdarhat Cadet

== Chandpur District ==
- Hasan Ali Govt. High School, Chandpur Sadar
- Matripith Govt. Girls High School, Chandpur Sadar
- Ruhiter Par D.M. High School, Matlab Uttar, Chandpur

== Chittagong District ==
=== NCTB Schools ===
Name	Location	Establishment
Zafrabad High School	Mirsharai, Chattagram	1966
Kadam Mubarak City Corporation High School	Momin Road, Ward No. 32,Kotwali, Andarkilla-4000, Bangladesh, Chattagram	1966
Kazem Ali High School ( Chittagong Middle English School)	Chittagong College Road, Chattagram	1885
Nasirabad Government High School	Nasirabad, Chattagram	1967
International Hope School Bangladesh	Nasirabad Boys School, Chittagong	1996
A. L. Khan High School		1930
CDA Public School and College	Chandgoan residential area, Chandgaon Thana, Chattogram	2008
Cantonment English School & College	9RW9+F2J, Bayzid Bostami, Unnamed Road, Chittagong 4210	1998
Fatickchari Coronation Model High School	Fatickchari, Chittagong District	1912
Bhujpur Model High School	Bhujpur, Chittagong	1946
Abdul Khalek Academy	Sandwip, Chittagong	
Abdur Rahman Government Girls' High School	Patiya, Chittagong	1957
Agrabad Balika Bidyalay	Agrabad, Chittagong	1981
Agrabad Government Colony High School	Agrabad, Chittagong	1960
Amirabad Janakalyan High School	Amirabad, Lohagara, Chittagong	1970
East Gomdandi Alhaz Bodruz Meher High School,	Boalkhali Municipality, Boalkhali, Chittagong	1996
Aparnacharan City Corporation Girls' High School	Nandankanan, Chittagong	1927
Ayesha Obayed Girls High School	Sandwip, Chittagong	
Azimpur High School	Sandwip, Chittagong	
Bakalia Government High School	Chawkbazar, Chittagong	1967
Bangladesh Bank Colony High School	Agrabad, Chittagong	
Bangladesh Mohila Samity Girls' High School & College	Dampara, Chittagong	1962
Bayezid Bostami Cantonment Board High School	Chittagong Cantonment	1989
BCSIR Laboratory High School	Hathazari Road, Chittagong	1989
Bangladesh Navy School & College, Chittagong	Sailors Colony-1, CEPZ, Bandar, Chittagong	1977
Bauria Golam Khalek Academy		1950
Burischar High School		
Cantonment English School & College	Chittagong Cantonment	1998
Chickdair High School		1980
Child Heaven School		
Chittagong Cantonment Public College	Chittagong Cantonment, Chittagong	1962
Chittagong Collegiate School	Ice Factory Road, Chittagong	1836
Chittagong Government Girls' High School	Nasirabad	1967
Chittagong Government High School	College Road	1906
Chittagong Grammar School	5 campuses in Chittagong	1992
Chittagong International School		
Chittagong Model School and College	Near CPI, Nasirabad, Khulshi	2006
Chittagong Municipal Model High School		1880
Chittagong Police Institution		
Chittagong Steel Mills High School		1969
Chittagong Urea Fertilizer School and College		
Chunati High School	Chunati, Lohagara Upazila Chittagong	1958
CIDER International School	53A, Nasirabad I/A, Chittagong	1997
Dr. Khastagir Government Girls' School	Jamal Khan, Chittagong	1907
Dwip Bondhu Mostafizur Rahman High school	Sandwip, Chittagong	
East Sandwip Enam Nahar Girls High school	Sandwip, Chittagong	
Eastern Refinery Model High School		1974
Fatehpur Mehernega High School		1968
Faujderhat Cadet School & College	Faujdarhat, Sitakunda Upazila	1958
Faujdarhat Collegiate School	Cadet College Campus, Sitakunda Upazila	1982
Faujdarhat K. M. High School		1950
Ispahani Public School & College	Zakir Hossain Road, Chittagong	1979
Gachua Adarsha High School	Sandwip, Chittagong	1987
Garib-E-Newaz High School		1980
Government Muslim High School	Kotowali, Chittagong	1909
Hazi Mohammad Mohsin Government High School	College Road	1874
Hatey Khari School & College		1976
Hathazari Parbati Model High School		1914
Holy Child School & College	Kuyesh Link Road, Oxygen, Bayezid, Chittagong-4213	1997
Holy Flower Ideal School		2002
J.M. Senior School & College		1913
Jeben Nur Sultana High School	Sandwip, Chittagong	
Kalapania Chowdhury Biddah Nikaton	Sandwip, Chittagong	
Kalapania High School	Sandwip, Chittagong	
Kargil Government High School	Sandwip, Chittagong	1902
Katgar Golam Nabi High School	Sandwip, Chittagong	
Kazi Afaz Uddin Adarsha High School	Sandwip, Chittagong	
Khawja Ajmeri High School		1993
Khulshi Cherry Grammar School		1992
Leaders' School & College Chattogram	Baluchara, Chittagong	2018
Little Jewels School		1974
Magdhara High School	Sandwip, Chittagong	
Maitbhanga High School	Sandwip, Chittagong	
Milestone International School		2016
Miriam Ashram High School		1946
Modhya Santospur High School	Sandwip, Chittagong	
Momena Sekander Govt. Girls High School	Sandwip, Chittagong	
Musapur Bodiuzzaman High School	Sandwip, Chittagong	
Musapur Hajee Abdul Baten High School	Sandwip, Chittagong	
Muslim Education Society High School		1960
Nasirabad Government High School	Nasirabad, Chittagong	1967
Natmura Pukuria High School	Banshkhali Upazila Chittagong	1957
Patenga High School	North Patenga, Chittagong	1962
Pologround High School		1953
Pomara High School		1928
Port Authority High School, Chittagong	Neemtola, Bandar, Chittagong	1959
Queen Mary School & College	1216/A, East Nasirabad, 2 No Gate, Chittagong	2015
Rahamatpur High School	Sandwip, Chittagong	
Rotary Betagi Union High School	Rangunia Upazila	1968
Saint Placid's High School		1853
St. Scholastica's Girls' High School		1883
Sandwip Ideal High School	Sandwip, Chittagong	
Sandwip Model High School	Sandwip, Chittagong	
Sandwip Public High School	Sandwip, Chittagong	
Santospur High School	Sandwip, Chittagong	
Sarkarhat N. R. High School		1939
Silver Bell Kindergarten and Girls High School		2000
Sitakund Government Model High School		1913
South East Sandwip High school	Sandwip, Chittagong	
South Sandwip Abeda Foyez Girls High School	Sandwip, Chittagong	
South Sandwip High School	Sandwip, Chittagong	
Sunshine Grammar School	Nasirabad H/S, Chittagong	1985
TSP Complex Secondary School	TSP Colony, North Patenga, Chittagong	1979
P. H. Ameen Academy	South kattali, Pahartali, Chittagong	1942
Panchuria Halima Rahman High School	Patiya, Chittagong	2000
Gomdandi Pilot Model High School	Boalkhali, Chittagong	1958
Little Jewels School	Chittagong City	
Mastermind International School		
Presidency International School		1998
West Gomdandi Union High School	Boalkhali, Chattagong	1950
Mirza Ahmed Ispahani Smrity Biddalaya	Mohora, Chandgaon, Chittagong	1969
Iqra Abdul Jabbar High School	Lohagara, Chattogram	1988
Swapnanagar Bidyaniketan	Kachuai, Patiya, Chattogram	2009

=== International Schools ===
==== Independent ====
Name	Location	Curriculum
Halls Academy at Laila Ahmed Halls	Sitakunda	Blended (American/Canadian)
William Carey Academy	Nasirabad	American

==== British Council ====
Name	Location	Curriculum
Chittagong Grammar School	Kotwali	CIE
CIDER International School	Bayzid	CIE
Sunshine Grammar School	Nasirabad	CIE/Edexcel
International Hope School Bangladesh	Muradpur	CIE
Frobel Academy	Quaish	CIE
AUW Laboratory School	Chatteswari	CIE
Little Jewels School	Katalgonj	CIE/Edexcel
Presidency International School	Panchlaish	CIE

== Comilla District ==
Name	Location	Established
Akbbarer Nesa Girls High School		1981
Bakhrabad Gas Adarsha Bidhalaya		1995
Bibir Bazar High School		1946
Comilla Cantonment High School		
Comilla High School		1947
Comilla Modern High School		1993
Comilla Zilla School		1837
Ibn Taimiya School and College	EPZ Road, Tomsom Bridge	1979
Ispahani Public School & College	Comilla Cantonment	1963
Laksam Pilot High School		1900
Nawab Faizunnessa Government Girls' High School		1873
Oxford International School & College, Chandina		
Oxford International School & College	Debidwar	2001
Subrati Shahajdi M. M. High School		1969
Union Technical High School		
Jagatpur Sadhana High School		
Gunabati High School		

== Cox's Bazar District ==
Name	Location	Established
Subrang High School	Teknaf, Cox`s Bazar	1986

== Feni District ==
Name	Location	Established
Feni Government Pilot High School	College Road, Feni Sadar Upazila, Feni	1886
Dharmapur Educational Estate	South Dharmapur, Fulgazi, Feni.	1965
Karim Ullah High School		
Shaheen Academy School & College Feni	Shaheen Academy Road, Rampur, Feni Sadar Upazila, Feni	1985
Feni Government Girls' High School	Grand Trunk Road, Feni Sadar Upazila, Feni	
Doulatpur Hoq Bahadur High School, Feni	Doulatpur, Dholia Union, Feni Sadar Upazila, Feni	1959
Dagonbhuiyan Academy	Upazilla Road, Dagobhuiyan, Feni.	1987
Atatürk Government Model High School		1939

== Lakshmipur District ==
Name	Location	Established
NearSchool.org	Bangladesh	
Raipur L M Pilot Model High School	Raipur Upazila Sadar, Lakshmipur	1911
Lhumbnagar Academy High School		1995

== Noakhali District ==
Name	Location	Established
Noakhali Zilla School	Noakhali Sadar	1853
Begumganj Government Pilot High School	Begumganj	1857
Brother Andre's High School	Sonapur, Noakhali Sadar	1967
Pana Mia T.F High School	Charmotua, Noakhali Sadar	1867
Bazra M.L. High School	Bazra, Sonaimuri	1918
Al-Farooq Academy	Maijdee Court, Sadar	1984
Noakhali Government Girls' High School	Sadar	1934
Mohammad Pur Janata High School	Mohammad Pur, Chatkhil, Noakhali	
Abir Para High School	Abir Para, Sonaimuri Noakhali	
Basurhat A. H. C. Govt. High School	Basurhat	
Companyganj Model School	Companyganj	
Bijbag N.K High School	Bijbag, Senbag, Noakhali	

== Rangamati District ==
Name	Location	Established
Kaptai High School	Natun Bazar, Kaptai Upazila, Rangamati Hill District	1981
Rangamati Government High School	Rangamati Sadar Upazila, Rangamati Hill District	1890
Lakers Public School & College	Kathaltoli, Rangamati Sadar Upazila, Rangamati Hill District	1991
Vedvedee Poura High School	Rangamati Sadar Upazila, Rangamati Hill District	1988

== Khagrachari District ==
Name	Location	Established
Natun Kuri Cantonment High School	Khagrachari Sadar	1986
Khagrachari Cantonment Public School	Khagrachari Cantonment	2006
