= Bakalia Government High School =

Location
- Chawkbazar, Chittagong; Bangladesh; 22.3559°N 91.8448°E

Information
- Type: Public
- Motto: “God, rise my knowledge”
- Established: 1967
- School district: Chittagong
- Headmaster: Jasim Uddin
- Grades: 5th to 10th
- Gender: coeducational, separated
- Enrollment: 1500+
- Website: bghsctg.edu.bd

Bakalia Government High School, Chattogrm Government (Bengali: বাকলিয়া সরকারি উচ্চ বিদ্যালয়), formerly known as Bakalia Government Laboratory High School, is a public secondary school, located in Bakalia in Chittagong, Bangladesh. The school was established in 1967. The architectural design of Bakalia Government High School and the Nasirabad Government High School is done by the same architect; moreover both schools were built in 1967. Boys and girls are split into two separate shifts in the school. Girls attend school in the morning shift while boys attend their classes starting from noon, which is known as day shift. The school has 32 teachers and more than 1580 students. It ranked 19th in the results of the 2015 Secondary School Certificate (SSC) examination in Chattogram Board; in the 2017 results, it was 9th among the schools in the board. In 2020, Bakalia Government High School ranked 6th among schools of Chattogram in Secondary School Certificate exam.

== History ==
The school was established in 1967 during Pakistani rule. After the independence of Bangladesh in 1971, the school came under the control of the government of Bangladesh.

== See also ==
- Hazi Mohammad Mohsin Government High School
- Dr. Khastagir Government Girls' School
- Chittagong Collegiate School
- Saint Placid's High School
- Nasirabad Government High School
