= BAF Shaheen College Chattogram =

Educational institution in Chattogram, Bangladesh

- বিএএফ শাহীন কলেজ চট্টগ্রাম
- Seal of BAF Shaheen College Chattogram

Location
- Patenga Thana, Chittagong; Bangladesh
- 22.2655°N 91.8149°E

Information
- Type: School and college
- Motto: শিক্ষা সংযম শৃংখলা (Education- Restraint- Discipline)
- Established: 1978; 48 years ago
- Founder: Bangladesh Air Force
- School board: Chattogram Education Board
- Authority: Bangladesh Air Force
- School code: EIIN-104265
- Principal: Group Captain Wasim Mustaque, BPP, psc, GD(P)
- Grades: KG to 12th
- Gender: co-ed
- Education system: NCTB
- Language: Bengali and English
- Campus: BAF Base Zahurul Haque, Patenga, Chittagong District, Bangladesh
- Campus type: Urban
- Yearbook: Shaheen
- Affiliation: Ministry of Education
- Website: bafsc.edu.bd

BAF Shaheen College Chattogram (Bengali: বিএএফ শাহীন কলেজ চট্টগ্রাম) is a school and college in Chittagong, Bangladesh. It is situated at Bangladesh Air Force (BAF) base Zhahurul Haque. It is directed by the BAF under the regulations of the Ministry of Education and the Board of Intermediate and Secondary Education, Chattogram.

== History ==
The school was established in 1978 by the Bangladesh Air Force. It added a higher secondary section in the 1985–86 academic year. In 2006, English-medium instruction in the National Curriculum and Textbook Board (NCTB) curriculum was introduced for one section of classes 2 through 5. English-medium instruction was added at the higher secondary level in 2014. It is co-educational from kindergarten through class 12.

== Campus ==
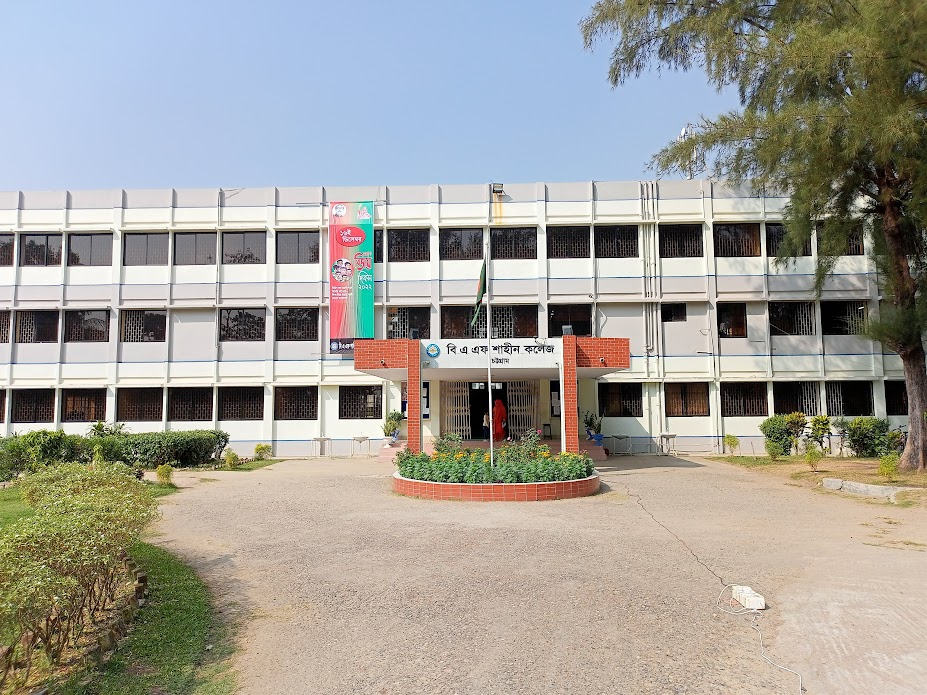
Front view

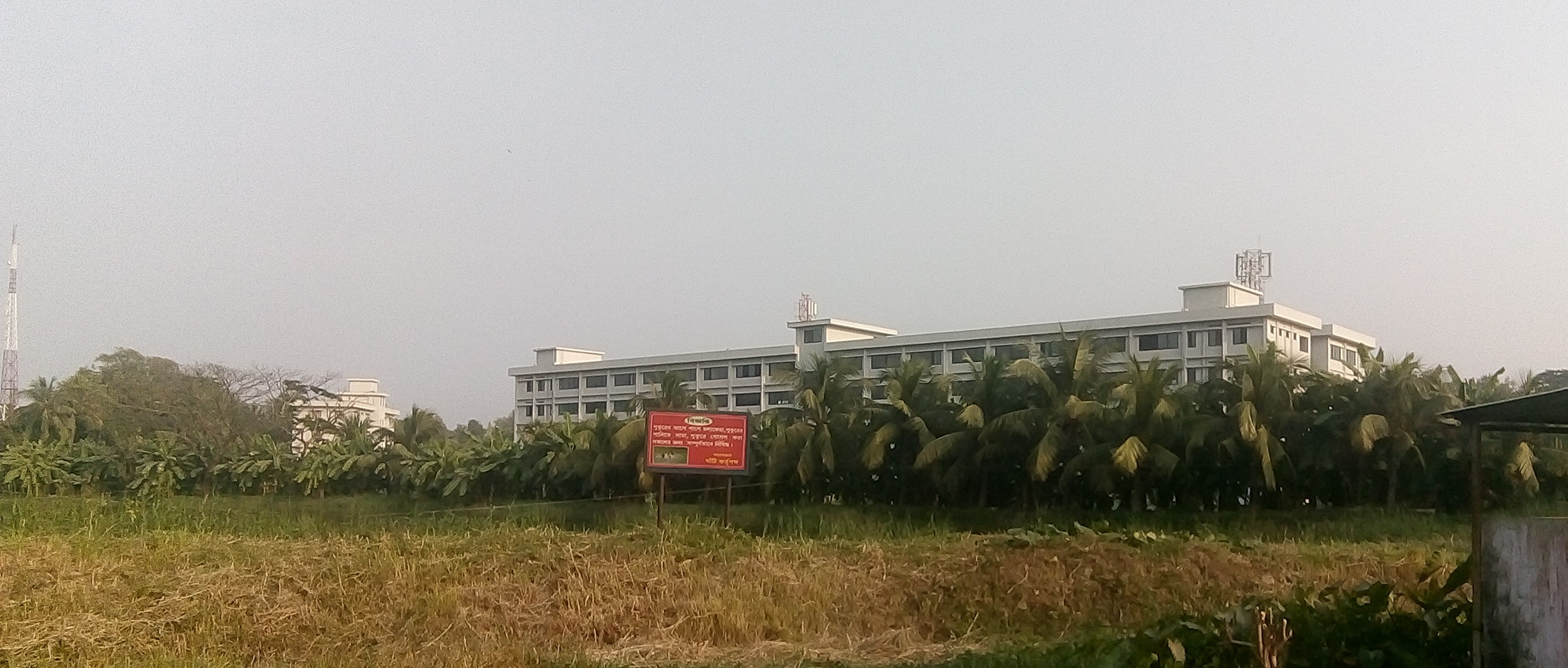
BAF shaheen College new build campus (left) and its teachers quarter (right).

The college is located in the Bangladesh Air Force's Jahurul Haque Base in Chittagong, in the airport area of Patenga Thana.
