= Patenga (disambiguation) =

Patenga is a coastal area in Chittagong. It may refer to:

- Patenga Sea Beach, a sea beach in Chittagong
- Patenga Thana, a police station in Chittagong City Corporation
