= Chittagong College =

College in Chittagong, Bangladesh

- চট্টগ্রাম কলেজ
- Motto: শিক্ষাই শক্তি
- Motto in English: Education is Power
- Type: Public
- Established: 1869; 157 years ago
- Affiliations: National University, Bangladesh; Board of Intermediate and Secondary Education, Chattogram
- Chairman: Md. Abu Taher
- Principal: Md. Mozahidul Islam Chowdhury
- Vice-Principal: Subrata Bikash Barua
- Academic staff: 169
- Administrative staff: 400
- Students: 18000+ (as of 2018)
- Location: Chawkbazar, Chittagong, Bangladesh; 22°21′10.73″N 91°50′12.68″E
- Campus: Urban, 20 acres (8.1 ha)
- Language: Bengali; English
- Website: www.ctgcollege.gov.bd

Chittagong College is a public educational institution in Chittagong, Bangladesh. It is a higher secondary school and also a degree awarding college of National University, Bangladesh. It is the second higher secondary school in the region that currently constitutes Bangladesh, established in 1869 after the Dhaka College in 1841.

== History ==
Having begun as Chattogram District school (now Chittagong Collegiate School) in 1836, it became an intermediate college on 2 January 1869. Its academic activities as a college started at a Portuguese-merchant-built building beside the Parade Ground. The first principal was J. C. Bose. Initially, it used to offer law education, but the subject was suspended in 1909. In the same year, it started providing science education in the intermediate section from the 1909. The institute became a graduation college in 1910 after University of Calcutta recognized it as a first class degree college.

From then it started providing honours degrees on Arabic, Bengali, Pali, Sanskrit, history, mathematics, physics and chemistry. In 1919, supplementary courses on English, economics and philosophy were introduced. In 1942, honours courses in Economics started. The college suspended its honours programme in 1955. But, it reintroduced honours courses on English, Bangla, economics, physics, chemistry and mathematics in 1960. B.Sc. (Bachelor of Science) courses on zoology and botany and B.A. (Bachelor of Arts) /B.Sc. (Bachelor of Science) course on statistics were introduced in 1962.

In 1926, A. K. Fazlul Huq established Muslim Chattrabash, which is now known as Sher-e-Bangla Chattrabas. The students of this institution participated in Language movement in 1952, Bengali Education movement in 1962, and Bangladesh Liberation War in 1971.

=== Affiliation ===
Course	Date of first affiliation
SSC	1836
Degree (Pass)	1910
Honours	1919
Master's Preliminary	1992
Master's Final	1992

== Faculties and departments ==
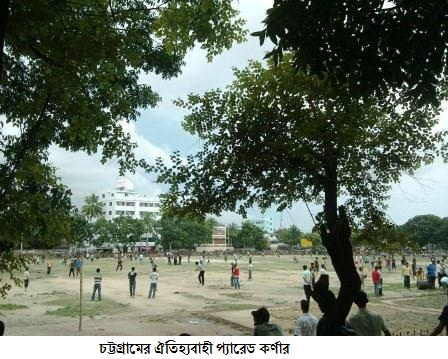
Parade ground of Chittagong College

The college teaches honours and offers master's degrees in 17 subjects (present 2018). Science and humanities are course for HSC student. The college has four academic buildings, a library with 60,000 books, a mosque, and an auditorium. One of the academic buildings is used as a foreign language teaching inclusive arts and an ICT (information and communication technology) lab based building.

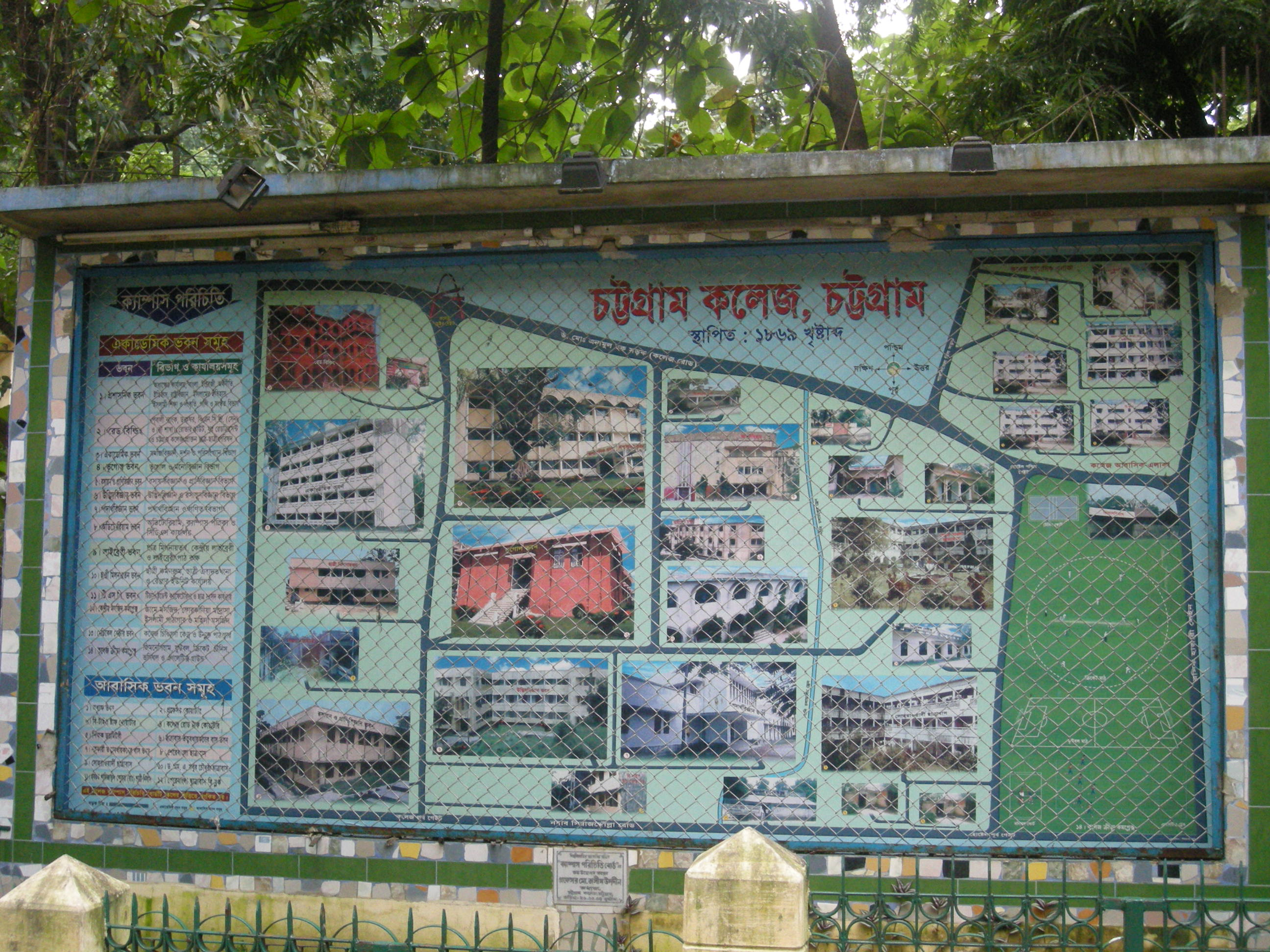
Administrational map of Chittagong College

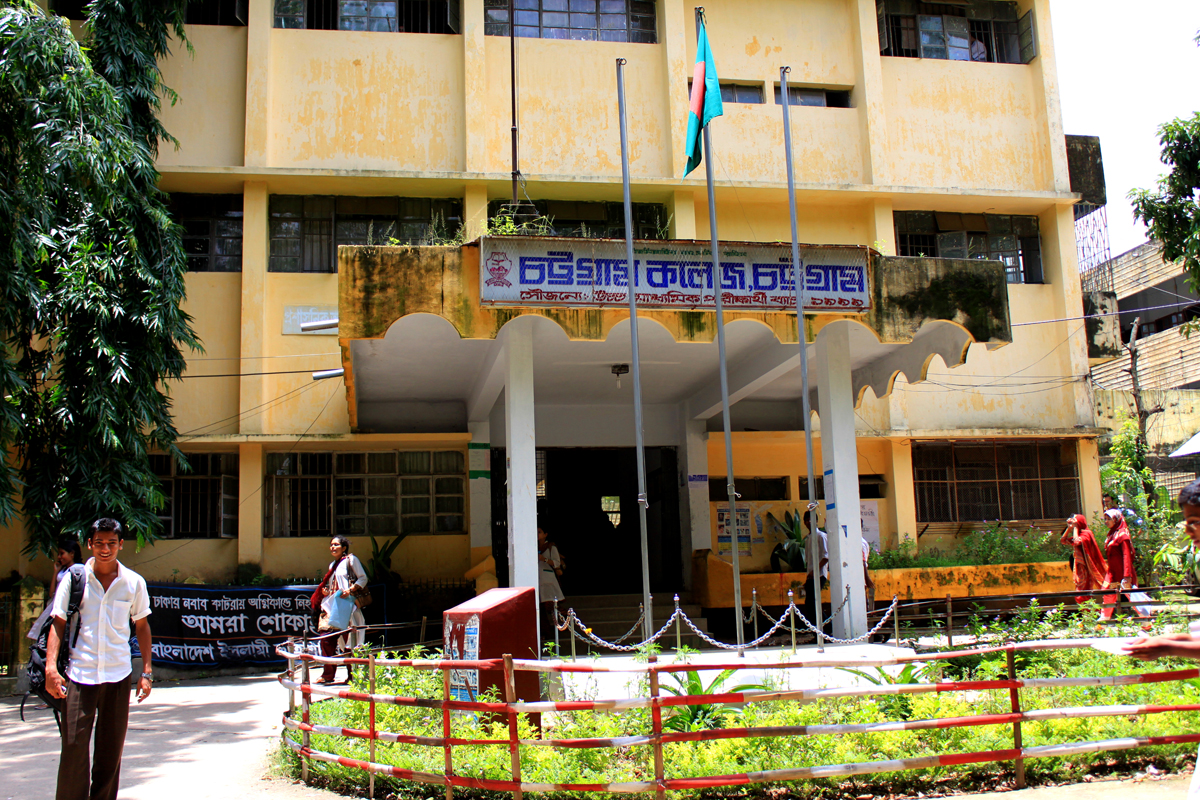
Administrational building of Chittagong College

=== Faculty of Arts & Social Science ===
The Department of English in Chittagong College is called Royal Department. Famous scholar Subodh Candra Sen Gupta joined in the department in 1933. It opened in 1910.

The faculty comprises the following departments:

- Department of Bengali
- Department of English
- Department of Economics
- Department of Political Science
- Department of History
- Department of Islamic History and Culture
- Department of Philosophy
- Department of Sociology
- Department of Islamic Studies

=== Faculty of Science ===
The faculty comprises the following departments:

- Department of Geography
- Department of Physics
- Department of Chemistry
- Department of Botany
- Department of Zoology
- Department of Statistics
- Department of Mathematics
- Department of Psychology

== College facility ==
=== Student dormitories ===
There are three male and one female student dormitories.

- Saheed Sohrawordy dormitory: "A" block is for Muslim students and "B" block is for non-Muslim students.
- Sher-e-Bangla dormitory
- Dr. Abdus Sabur dormitory: for honours and master's students
- Hazrat Khadizatul Kobra (R) dormitory: for female students
- Shekh Hasina dormitory: for female students

=== College ground ===
The college has a large ground known as Parade Ground. In this five acre ground students from the college and from other colleges play cricket, football, and volleyball. BNCC (Bangladesh National Cadet Corps) uses the ground.

=== Co-curricular activities ===
- Chittagong College ECA Club
- Chittagong College Information Technology Club (XI-XII students only)
- BNCC, the college has the HQ of Karnaphuly battalion-2 of Bangladesh National Cadet Corp. Two Sections are Army Wing and Naval Wing
- Rover Scout
- Red Crescent Society
- Chattogram College Creative Club

=== Chittagong College Information Technology Club (CCITC) ===
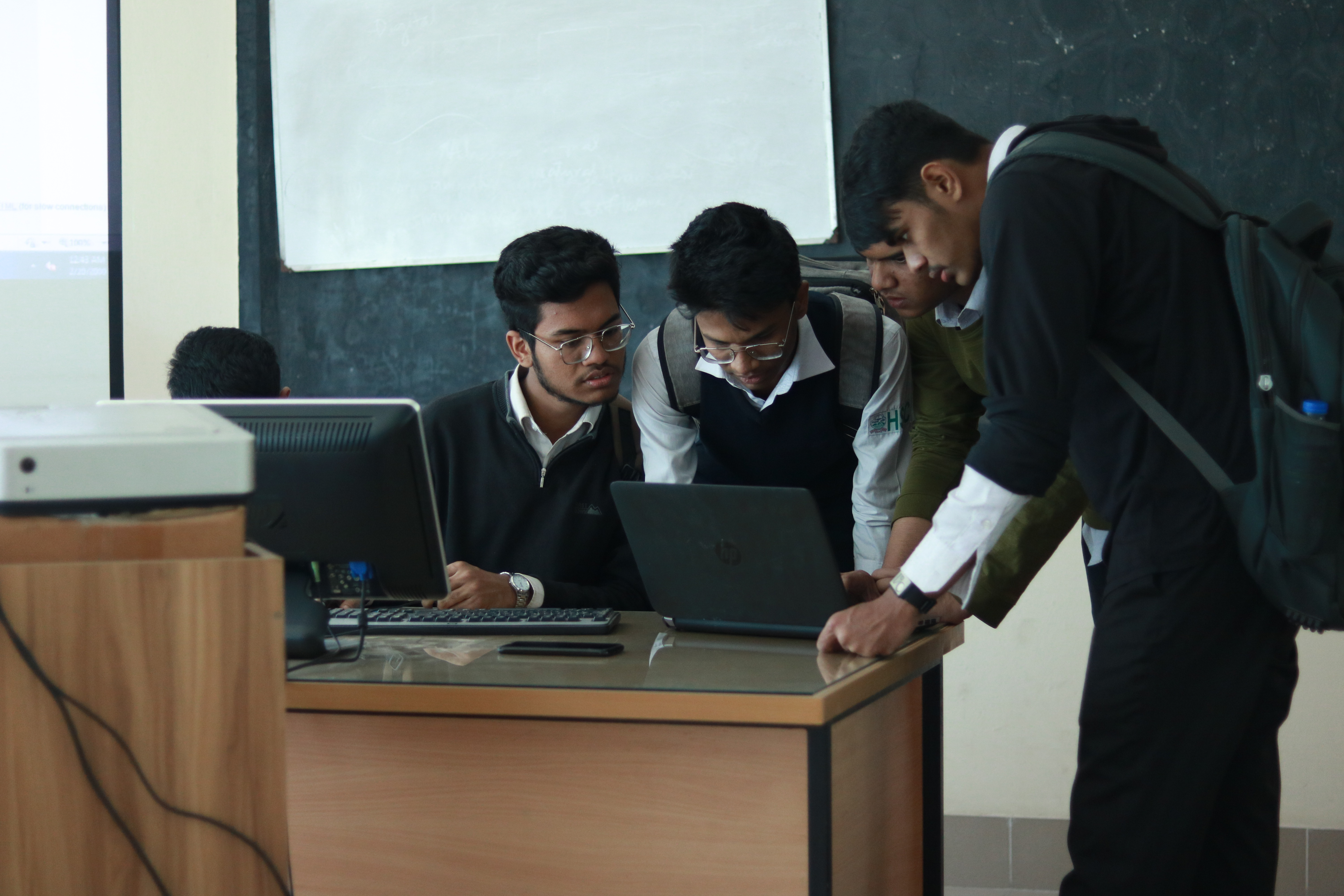

Chittagong College Information Technology Club was founded on February 2, 2020. It is a platform that provides students with opportunities to discuss various topics on informatics outside the classroom and enhance the skills of students other than the regular curriculum. Current activities include Programming and Problem Solving, IoT and Robotics, Web Development and Graphic Design, and Data Science and Machine Learning. There is one class per week for any of the above four topics. To attend the classes, being a member is mandatory.

=== Other facilities ===
- Two-storied mosque
- Common rooms for male and female students. The common room for female students is a two-storied building.
- Canteen between the auditorium and the administrative building
- Gymnasium
- Post office
- Pubali Bank, Chittagong College branch
- Medical centre
- Foreign language training center [FLTC]

== Notable alumni ==
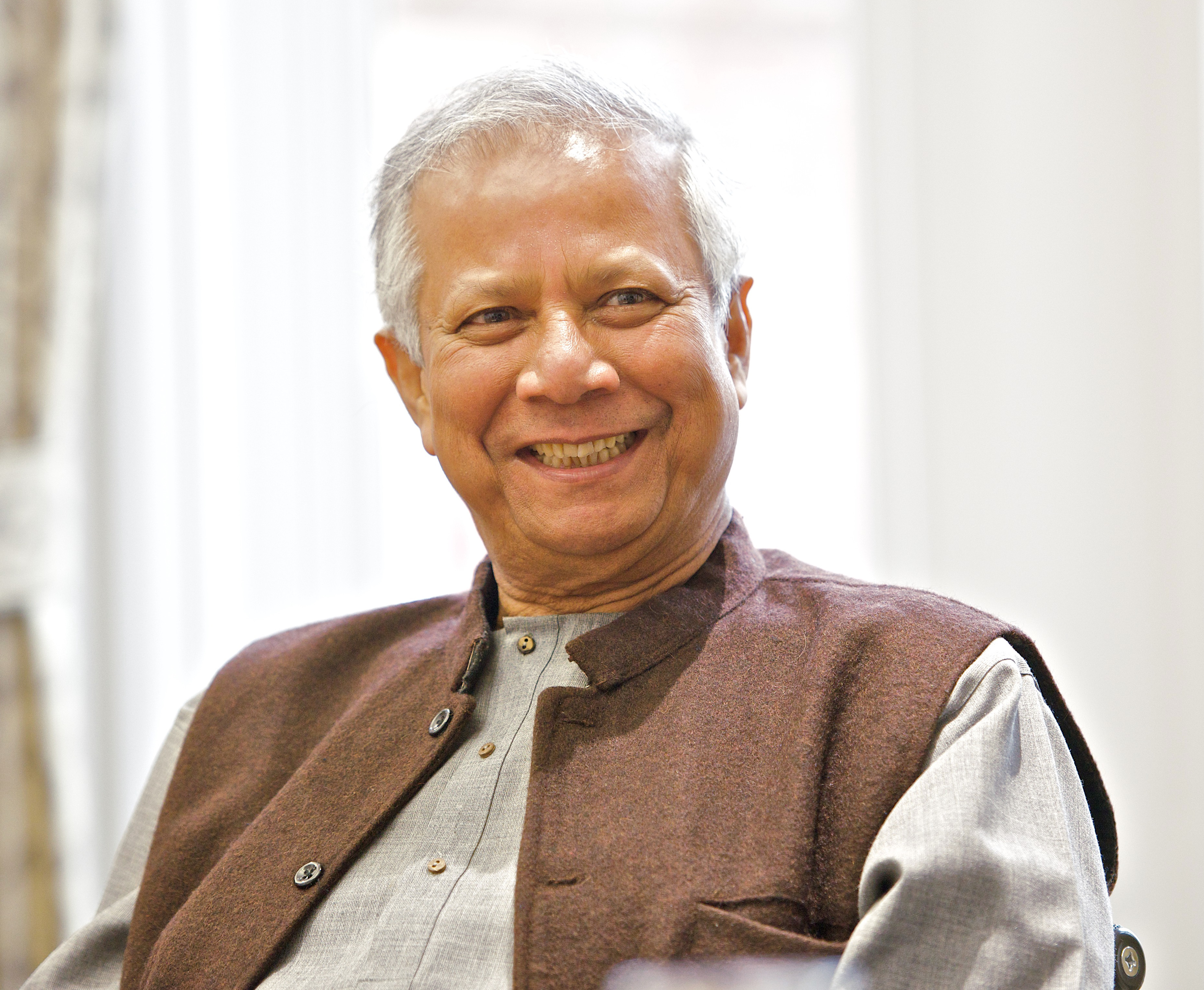
Nobel laureate Muhammad Younus

- Muhammad Yunus, awarded the Nobel Peace Prize for founding the Grameen Bank and pioneering the concepts of microcredit and microfinance. Incumbent Chief Adviser of Bangladesh
- Mahmudunnabi Chowdhury (1908–1995), former Minister of Relief and Rehabilitation
- Amir Khasru Mahmud Chowdhury (born 1949), former Minister of Commerce
- Wali Gandhi (1907-1978), journalist, writer, and political activist
- Janardan Chakravarti
- Nalinaksha Dutt.
- Bhabatosh Dutta
- Manabendra Narayan Larma, the founding leader of the Parbatya Chattagram Jana Samhati Samiti
- Salahuddin Ahmed, is a Bangladeshi politician and former Member of Parliament and also former Minister of State for Communications.
- Fazlul Karim, lawyer, businessman, politician and soldier. He was the first mayor of Cox's Bazar
- Enamul Haque, a Bangladeshi researcher, litterateur and educationist
- Salimullah Khan
- Birendra Kishore Roaza
- Asif Iqbal, Bangladeshi lyricist, music composer and corporate personality
- Bir Bahadur Ushwe Sing, is a Bangladeshi politician and former Member of Parliament and also former Minister of Chittagong Hill Tracts Affairs.
- A J M Nasir Uddin, Bangladeshi Politician, former Mayor of Chittagong and Vice President of Bangladesh Cricket Board.
- Rezaul Karim Chowdhury, Bangladeshi Politician and former Mayor of Chittagong.

== Notable faculty ==
- Surendranath Dasgupta, he was a professor of Bangla and Sangskrit in the college
- Subodh Chandra Sengupta, came to dept. of English in this college in 1933 from Presidency College, Kolkata
- Motaher Hussain Chowdhury, a Bengali writer, was born in Noakhali. He worked in Chittagong College from 1947 to 1956.
- Badruddin Umar
- Abdul Haque Faridi, lecturer

== Gallery ==
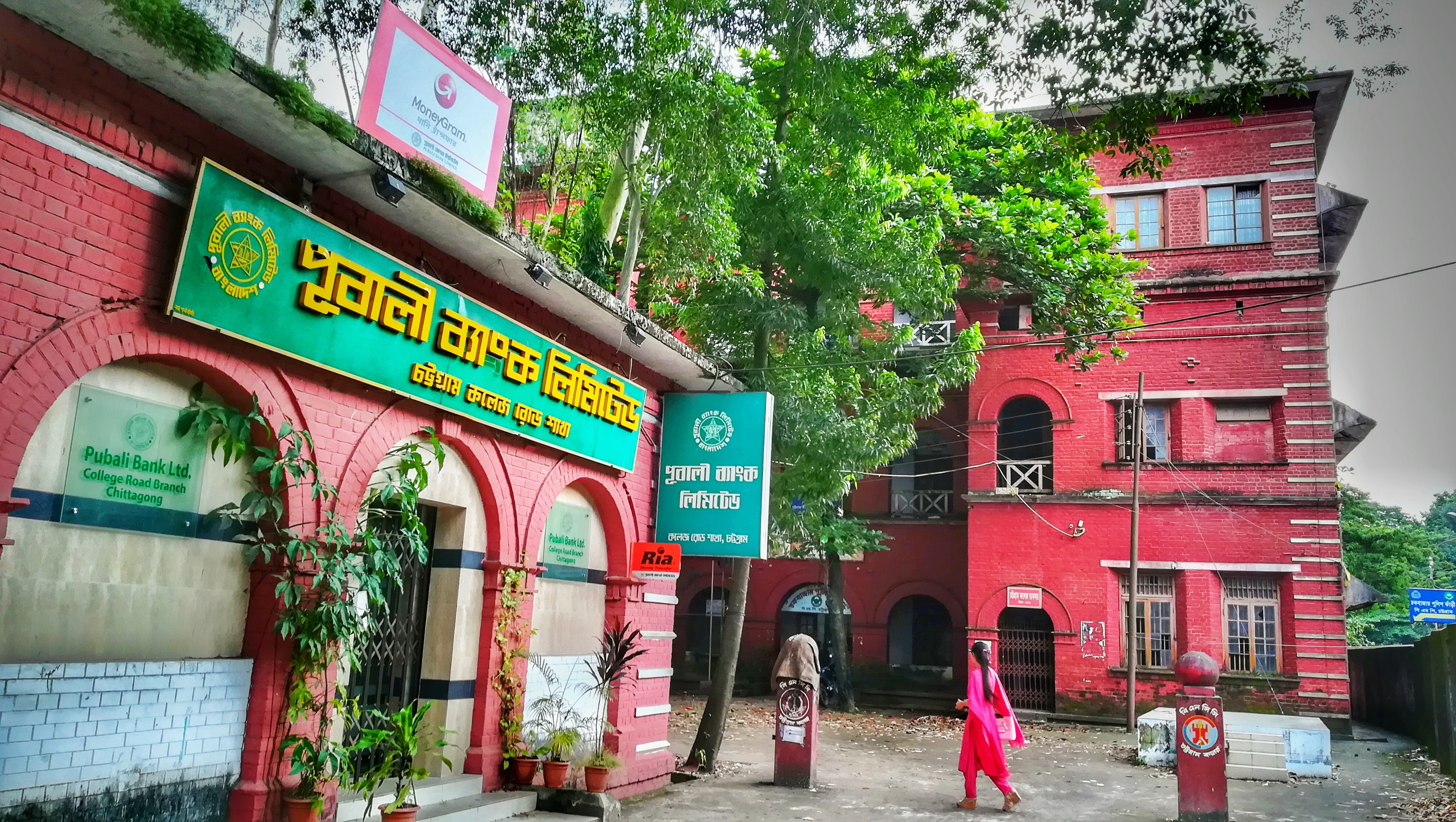

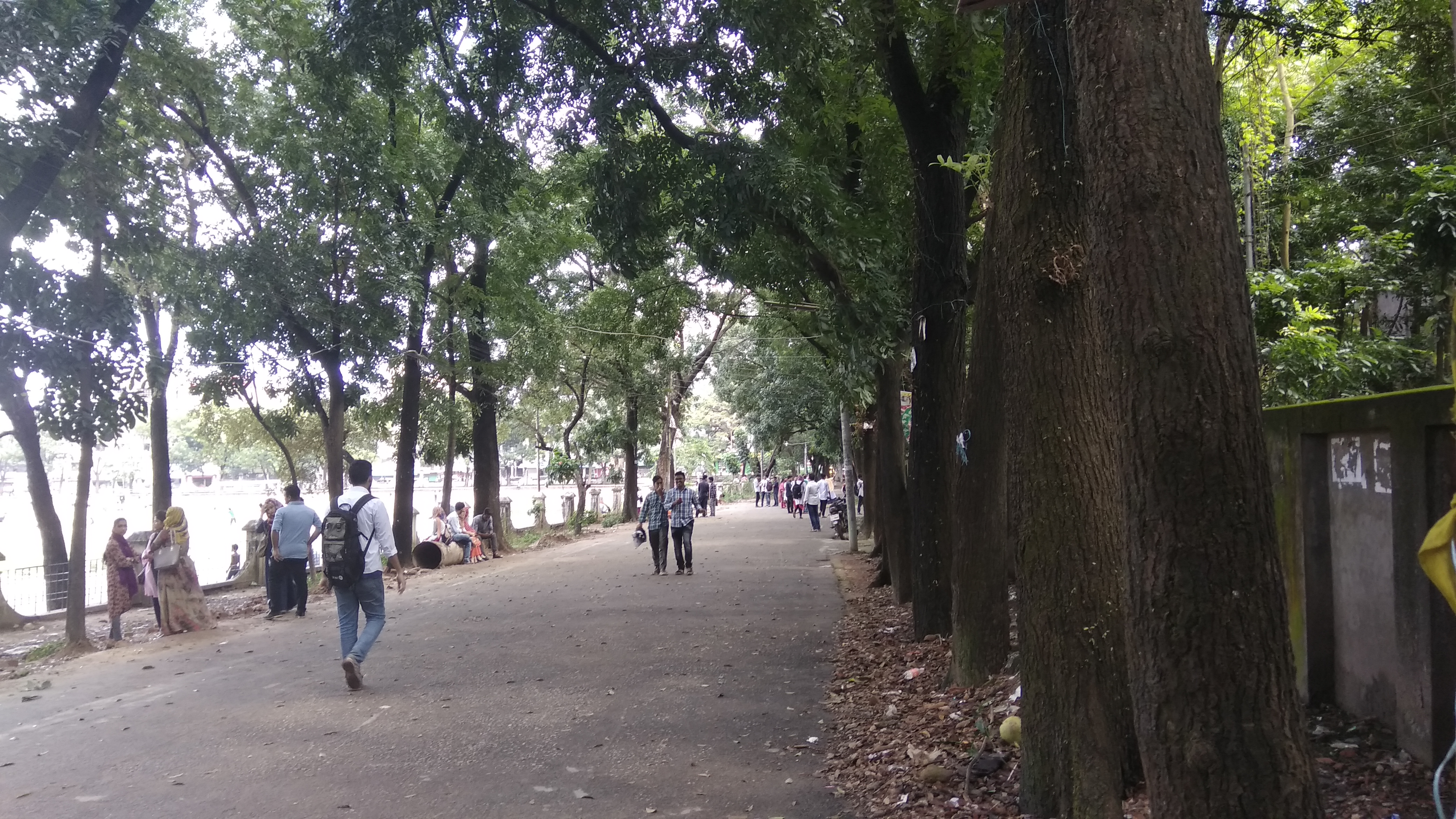
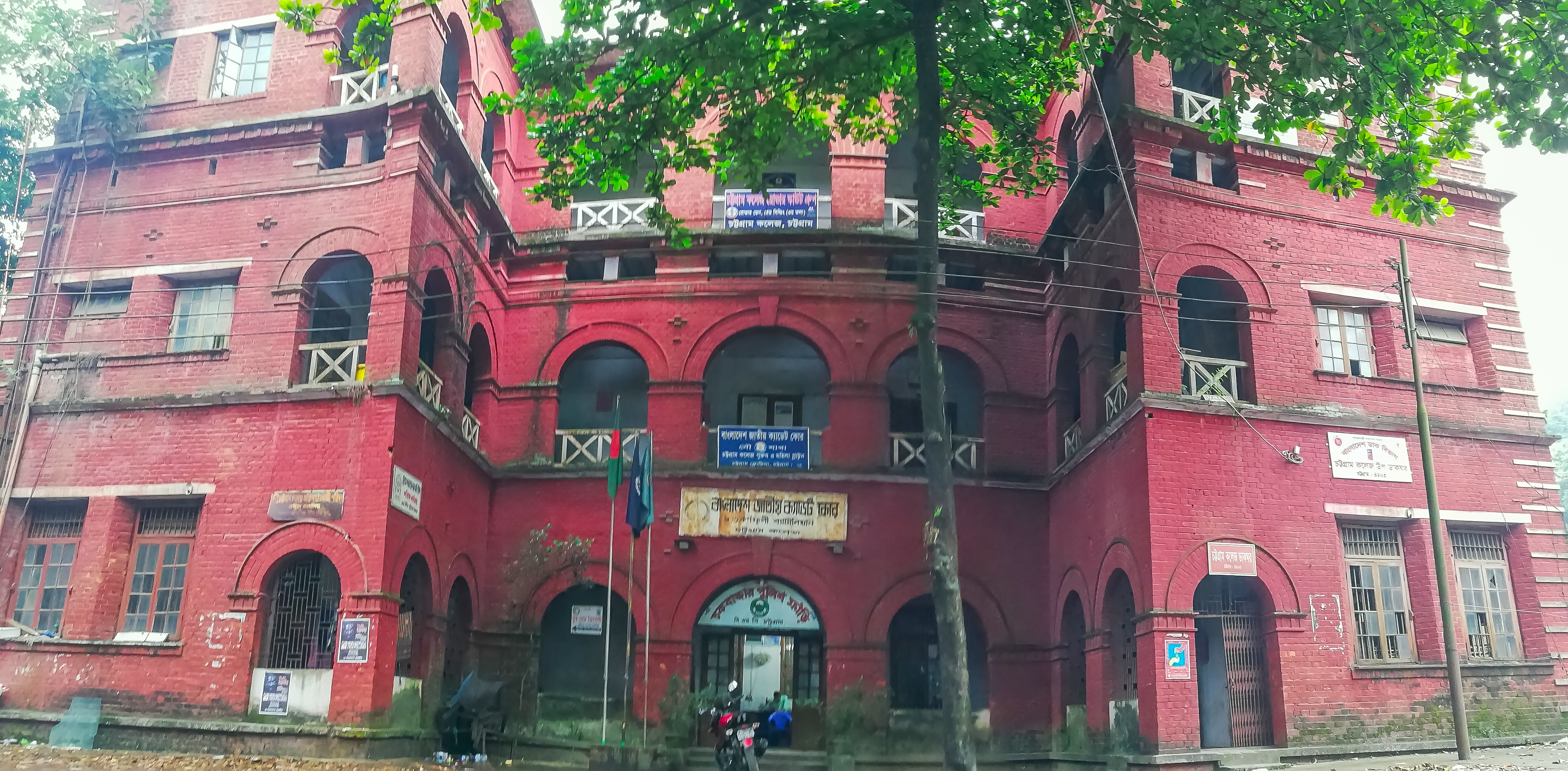

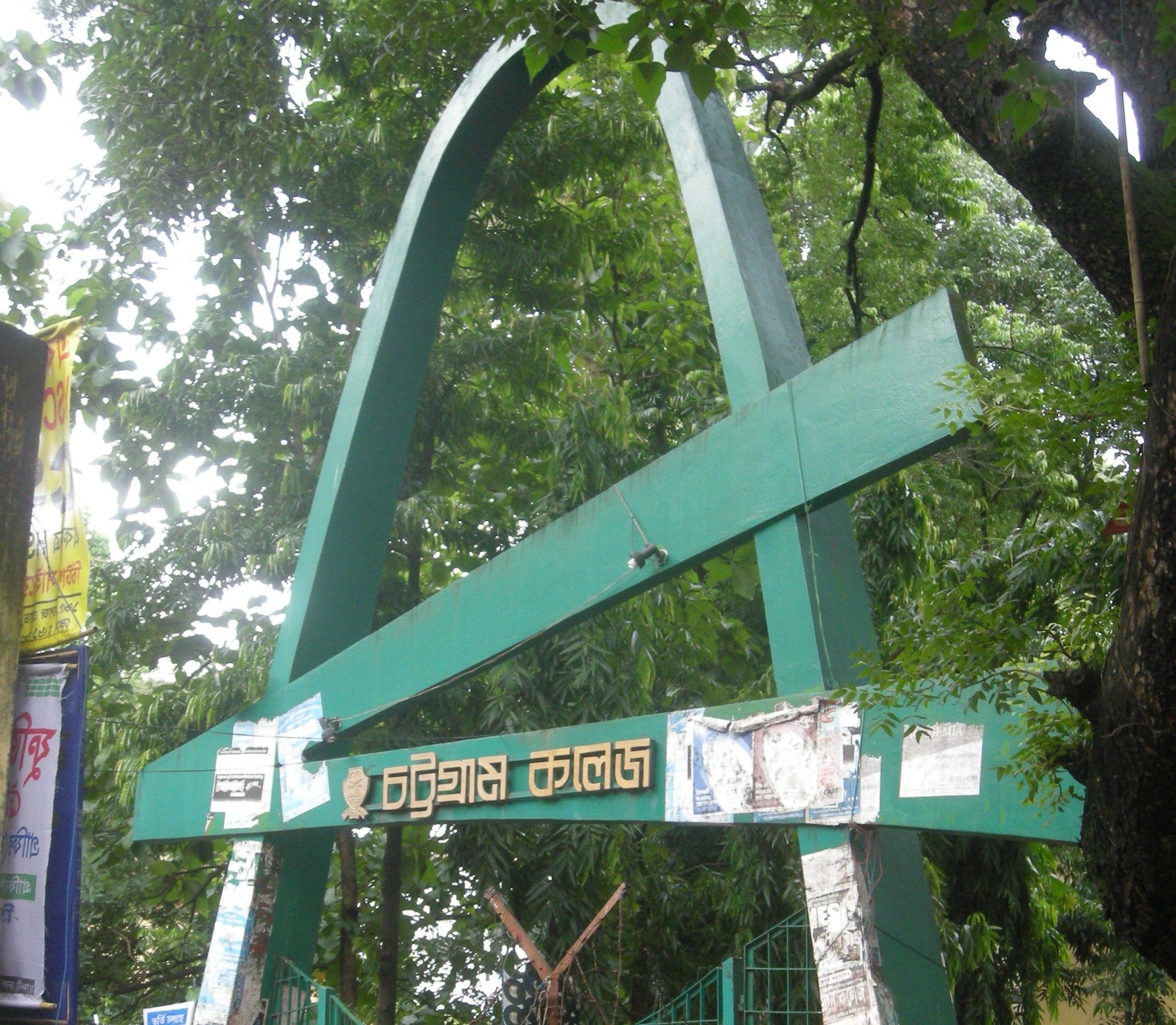
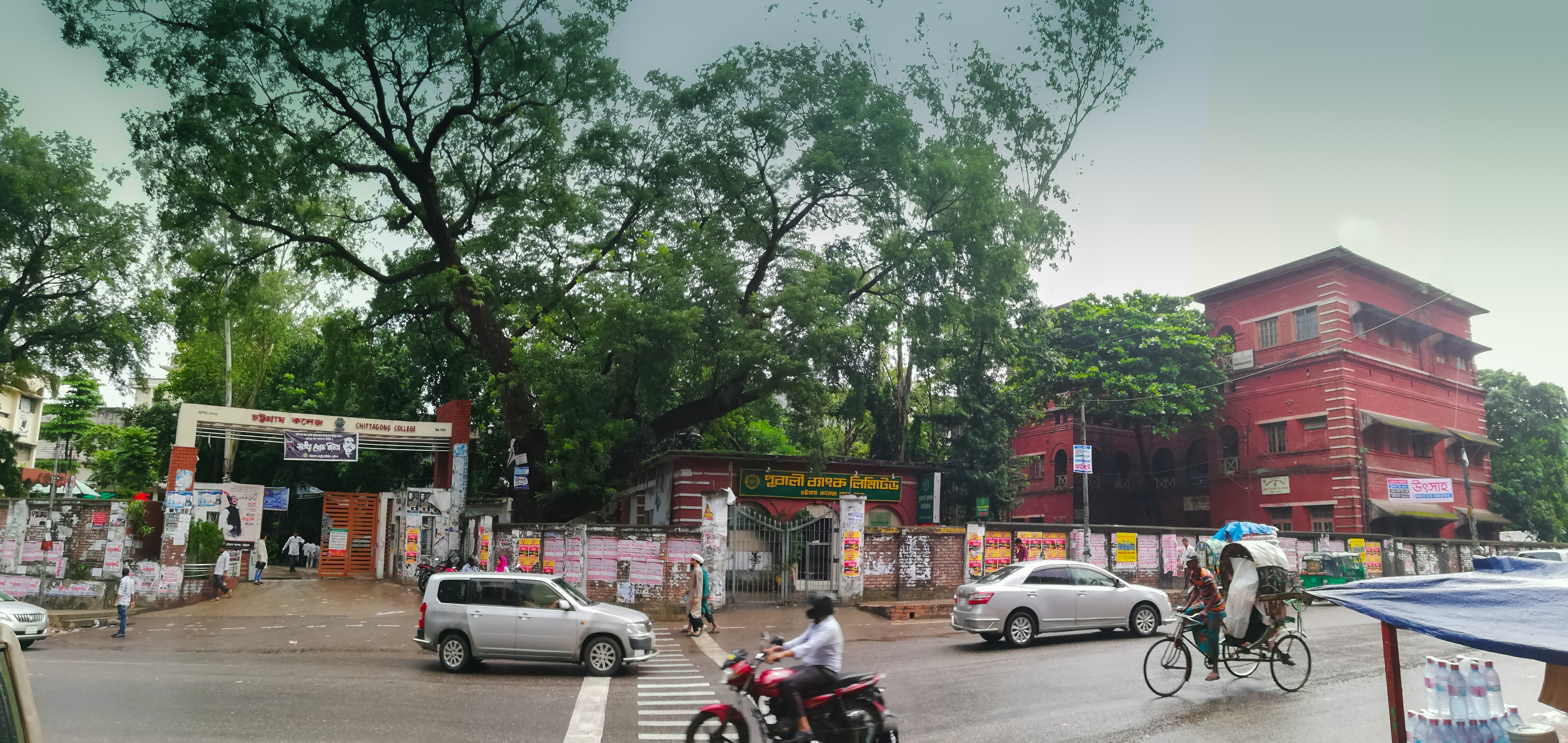

== See also ==
- Chittagong Collegiate School
- Government Hazi Mohammad Mohshin College
- Education in Bangladesh
