= Dainik Purbokone =

Bangladeshi daily newspaper

- Bengali: সঠিক সংবাদ সবার আগে, lit. 'The right news first'
- Type: Daily newspaper
- Format: Broadsheet
- Owner: The Purbokone Limited
- Founder: Mohammad Yusuf Chowdhury
- Publisher: Jasim Uddin
- Editor: M Ramiz Uddin Chowdhury
- Founded: February 10, 1986; 40 years ago
- Political alignment: Liberal
- Language: Bengali
- Headquarters: 971/A, CDA Avenue, East Nasirabad, Chattogram
- City: Chattogram
- Country: Bangladesh
- Circulation: 62,100 (as of 28 August 2019)
- Website: dainikpurbokone.net

The Dainik Purbokone (Bengali: দৈনিক পূর্বকোণ, lit. 'East angle') is a Bengali-language daily newspaper in Bangladesh, and one of the leading newspapers published in Chittagong. The newspaper was founded in 1986. According to the data published by the Department of Films and Publications, under the Ministry of Information, on 28 August 2019, its circulation of 62,100 copies was the largest of the national dailies published from Chittagong. In the assessment of the Bangladesh Press Institute in 1994, Purbokone was mentioned as the best daily.

== History ==
Purbokone was founded by Mohammad Yusuf Chowdhury in 1986. During its first published on 10 February 1986, K G Mustafa, an acclaimed country baroness and recipient of Ekushey Padak, served as editor. In 1989, Taslim Uddin Chowdhury, Son of Yusuf Chowdhury, took charge of the daily as the editor. In 2007, Taslim became the chairman of Purbokone Group and serves the daily as chief editor till his death in 2017. The printed version has been published daily from the beginning. In 2015, it also made its online edition.

== Editors ==
The current editor of the daily is M Ramiz Uddin Chowdhury.

== See also ==
- List of newspapers in Bangladesh
- Bengali-language newspapers
- Bainnachola-Manikpur High School
