= Jauhar Saleem =

Pakistani diplomat

Jauhar Saleem is a Pakistani career diplomat known for soft diplomacy. He assumed charge as Acting Foreign Secretary on 30 September 2022. He also served as Pakistan's ambassador to Italy from April 2020 to September 2022.

== Early life ==
Jauhar Saleem, a career diplomat of the Foreign Service of Pakistan born on 10 April 1963. His hometown is Lahore, Pakistan.

== Education ==
Jauhar Saleem was educated at GCU Lahore, University of Pennsylvania, Johns Hopkins University and Georgetown University.

== Career ==
Saleem is currently serving as Acting Foreign Secretary. He served on various assignments in the Pakistan Foreign Office as well as Pakistan's diplomatic missions abroad, including Brazil, Turkey, USA, and Croatia. Prior to his appointment as ambassador in 2007, he was also the Director General for Europe and Eurasia in the Foreign Office, Islamabad.

=== Bosnia and Herzegovina ===
Saleem was the Ambassador of Pakistan to Bosnia & Herzegovina from 2008 to 2011.

=== Bahrain ===
Saleem served as the Ambassador at the Embassy of Pakistan in Bahrain from 2011 to 2014.

=== Foreign Office Islamabad ===
Saleem is currently serving as the Acting Foreign Secretary. He has also served as Additional Foreign Secretary (Administration) and Director-General Foreign Service Academy Islamabad.

=== Germany ===
He was appointed as Pakistan's Ambassador to Germany in October 2015 and served there from 2016 to 2020.

=== Italy ===
From April 2020 till September 2022, he served as Pakistan's ambassador to Italy with concurrent accreditation to Slovenia, Albania and San Marino and took charge in April 2020.
