= Pratibha Mutsuddi =

Bengladeshi academic and activist (born 1935)

- প্রতিভা মুত্সুদ্দি
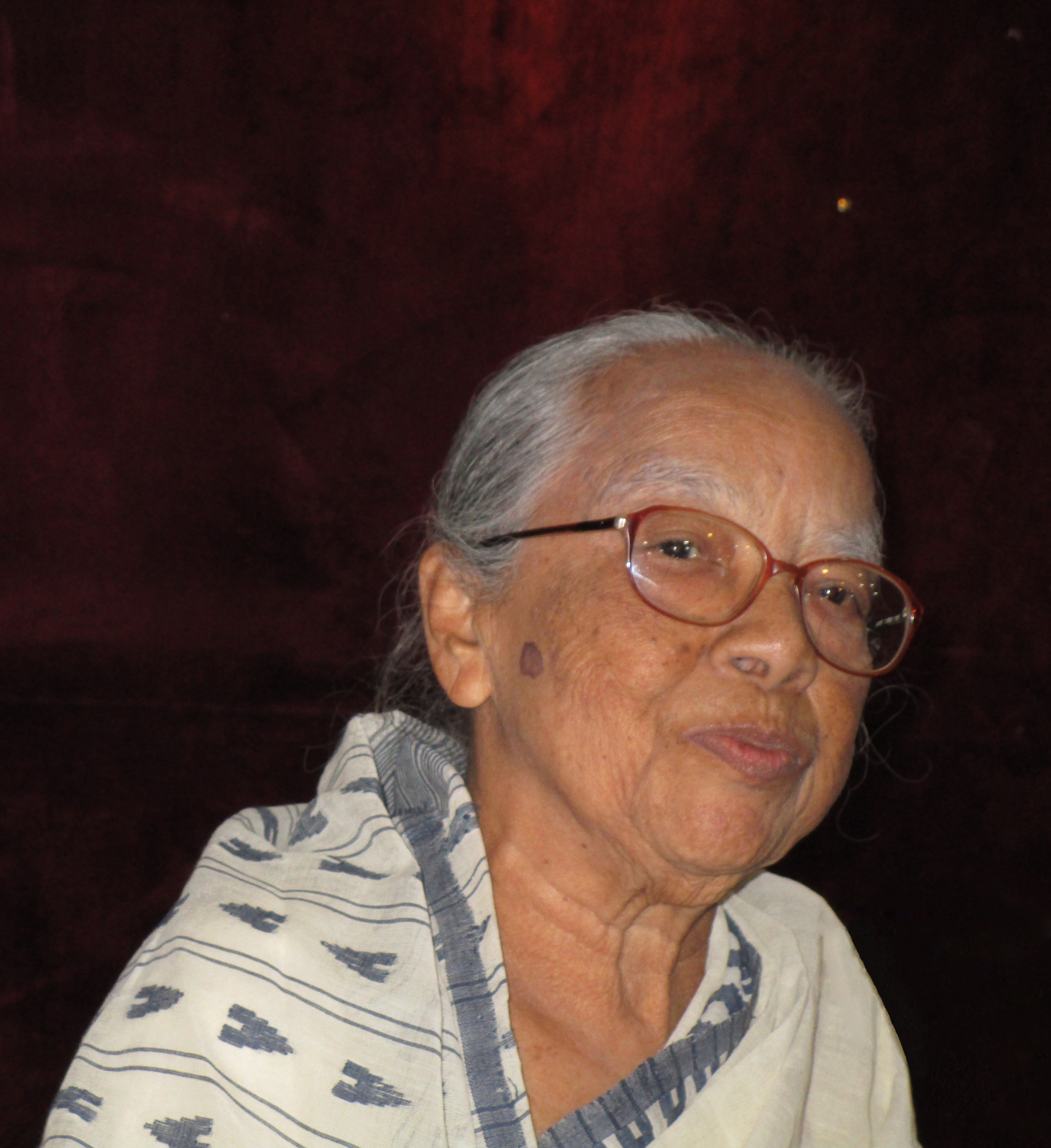
- Mutsuddi at the University of Dhaka (2015)
- Born: 16 December 1935 (age 90); Chittagong, Bengal Province, British India
- Education: Chittagong College; University of Dhaka
- Awards: See full list

Pratibha Mutsuddi (born 16 December 1935) is a Bangladeshi academic and language activist. She participated in the Bengali language movement in 1952. She served as the director and principal of Kumudini Welfare Trust, a welfare foundation founded by Ranadaprasad Saha in 1947. She was awarded Ekushey Padak in 2002 by the Government of Bangladesh for her contribution to education.

== Early life and education ==
She was born in Mohamuni Pahartali village in Chittagong, British India, the daughter of lawyer Kiron Bikash Mutsuddy and his wife Shaila Bala Mutsuddy; she was one of nine children. Mutsuddi studied at Mahamuni Anglo Pali Institution. Having received her early education in local schools, she went on to Dr. Khastagir Government Girls' School, Chittagong, where she passed the matriculation examination in 1951 progressing to Chittagong College, where she began studying for a degree in Economics, passing the intermediate examination in 1953. In 1957 she graduated with a B.A. from Dhaka University, where she became an elected official of the students' union, and obtained a master's degree in economics from the same university two years later. She completed her education by attending Mymensingh Teachers' Training College and obtaining a B.Ed. degree in 1960.

== Language activism ==
Following the Partition of India in 1947, she became concerned about the status of the Bengali language in East Pakistan, and joined the campaign to have it recognised as an official language, which in 1952 was successful. As head of Cox's Bazar Girls' High school, she came into conflict with vested interests and resigned in protest. In her new position at Joydevpur Govt. Girls' High School, she continued to face difficulties from bureaucracy and in 1963 she became an economics lecturer at Bharateswari Homes. Ranadaprasad Saha, the founder of the institution, promoted her to manager and finally to Principal. She also became an administrator at Kumuduni Welfare Trust, in which she continued to be involved after her retirement from teaching. In 2011, she was guest of honour at an event to recognise women's contributions to Dhaka University. In 2016, she was one of 27 prominent Bangladeshi citizens to receive a special award from Amin Jewellers on the occasion of the company's golden anniversary.

== Awards ==
- Ekushey Padak (2002)
- Bangladesh Buddhist Women's Federation Award (2013)
- Sufia Kamal Award (2015)
- Amin Jewelers Award (2016)
