= Swapnanagar Bidyaniketan =

Swapnanagar Bidyaniketan is a primary school providing free education to children in Kachuai, Patiya of Chittagong, Bangladesh. It was initiated in 2004 but temporarily closed down after two years due to insufficient resources. It reopened and was formally established in 2009 with structural reforms and added an agenda of promoting an improved lifestyle for the local community in Kachuai.

== Background ==
About 33 families, 200 residents at large, who live in the area of Kachuai are descendants of the workers of a deserted tea plantation. Some are born under the lower caste of Hindu religion and are commonly known as ‘Dher’. The community is marginalized and are deprived of the common facilities like electricity and clean water. They face a difficult time earning a living, so the children of these families show little interest in education as they tend to other chores to support the families.

In 2004, two young people named Rafiqul Islam and Wasim Uddin took up the initiative to help the isolated villagers by offering them an institutionalized education, and Swapnanagar started its journey with 6 pupils. However, the school was forced to shut down in 2006 because of the lack of funding but it reopened in 2009 as other community workers supported the project.

== Campus ==
Swapnanagar Bidyaniketan is located near the hills of Kachuai, which is 45 km south of Chittagong. Patiya is a sub-district in Chittagong division of Bangladesh and Kachuai is a small village in the area which was also called “Dherpara” or the “Patiya Cha Bagan” (Patiya Tea Garden). After the establishment of the school, the village gradually took the name Swapnanagar after the school.

The school is built on a one-shed house made upon the space of the demolished tea factory. The students receive a participatory education through observing, searching through and playing with nature. They are provided with book storage space which is supposed to grow to be the school's library.

== Academics ==
Swapnagar Bidyaniketon offered only primary education which is until the completion of Grade 5 or the PSC Examination in Bangladesh until recently. The school has initiated high school education too and currently has 115 primary level students, 35 high school goers with 10 academic staff.

This made the school follow the policy of 'Active Learning' that focuses on instilling theoretical knowledge and life skills through practical applications, like clay molding, gardening, keeping tidy and cultural activities. Sawpnanagar is also motivating students to do classes by giving them an egg before the class, enticing which with education, they call it the “Eggucation”. The school introduces students to social and cultural activities formally and plays an influential role in the community environment protection and development. This led to the school receiving an engagement from about 90% of the community and being the titular institution of the village.

== See also ==
List of schools in Chittagong
