= Chawkbazar Thana, Chattogram =

Thana in Chattogram Division, Bangladesh

Chawkbazar চকবাজার
- Thana
- Chalk Bazar
- Location in Bangladesh
- Coordinates: 22°21′30″N 91°50′15″E
- Country: Bangladesh
- Division: Chittagong Division
- District: Chittagong District
- Metropolis: Chittagong
- Jatiya Sangsad constituency: Chittagong-9
- Formed: 1978; 48 years ago

Government
  - Type: Metropolitan Police
  - Body: Chattogram Metropolitan Police
- Elevation: 15 m (49 ft)

Population (2022)
  - Total: 116,998
- Time zone: UTC+6 (BST)
- Postal code: 4203
- Area code: 031
- Website: Official map of Chawkbazar

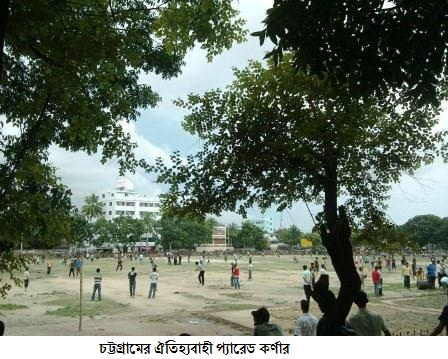
Parade Corner

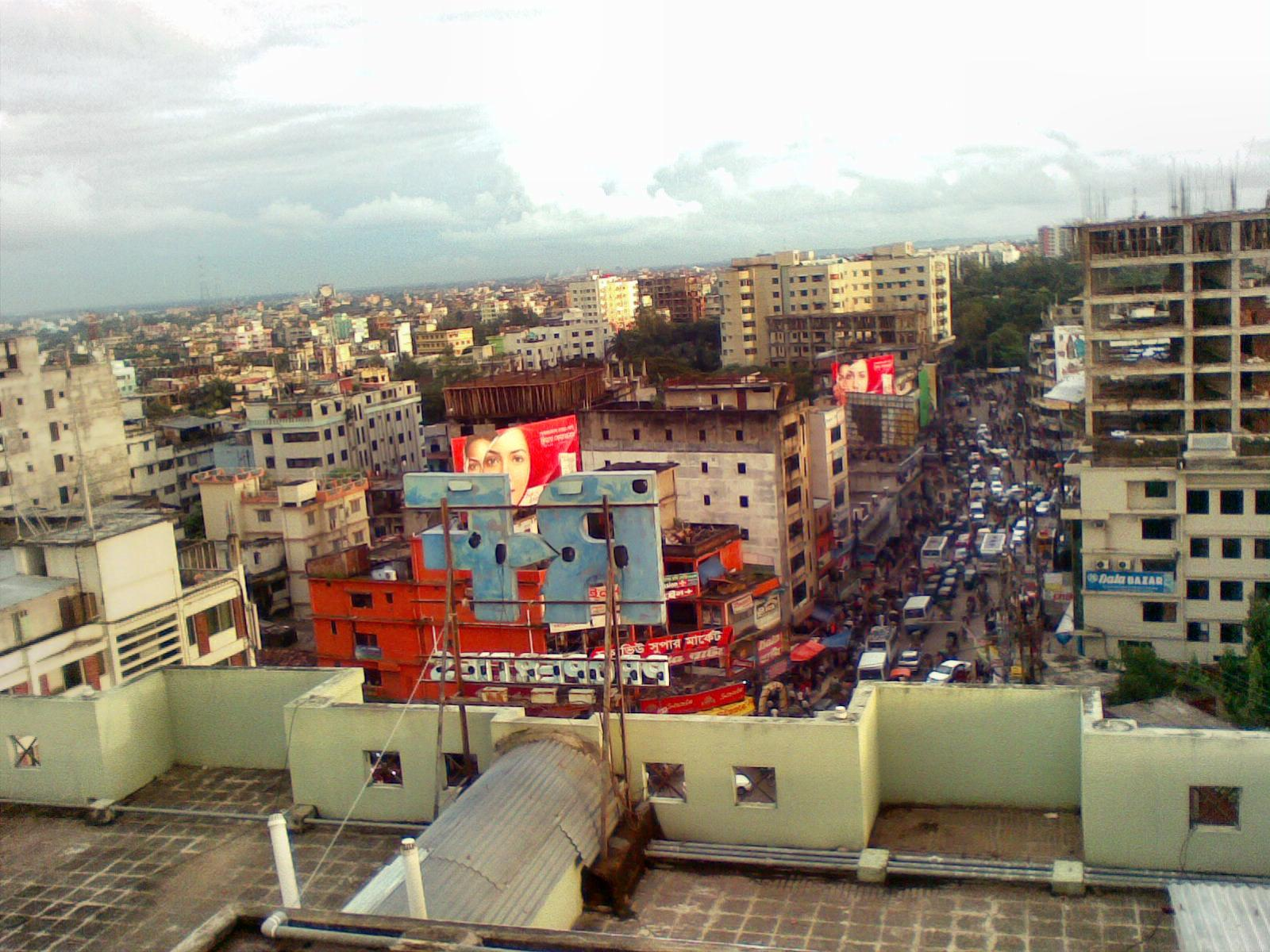
Chawkbazar area

Chawkbazar (Bengali: চকবাজার) is a thana under the Chattogram District in Chattogram Division, Bangladesh. It is one of the busiest places of Chattogram. It is also called the place of coaching centre.

== Demographics ==
Religions in Chawkbazar Thana (2022)
Religion	Percent
Islam	83.91%
Hinduism	14.33%
Buddhism	1.54%
Other or not stated	0.22%

According to the 2022 Bangladeshi census, Chawkbazar Thana had 27,261 households and a population of 116,998. 6.51% of the population were under 5 years of age. Chawkbazar had a literacy rate (age 7 and over) of 89.49%: 90.63% for males and 88.32% for females, and a sex ratio of 103.07 males for every 100 females.

== Education ==
Many notable educational institutions are situated in this area such as Chittagong College, Government Hazi Mohammad Mohshin College, Chittagong Government High School, Hazi Mohammad Mohsin Government High School, Chittagong Medical College, Chittagong Science College, several campuses of International Islamic University Chittagong etc.

== See also ==
- Upazilas of Bangladesh
- Districts of Bangladesh
- Divisions of Bangladesh
