= Nasirabad Government High School =

Coordinates: 22°21′42″N 91°49′14″E

- নাসিরাবাদ সরকারী উচ্চ বিদ্যালয়
- Nasirabad, Khulshi; Chittagong, 4000; Bangladesh

Information
- School type: Double shift, government funded secondary school
- Motto: জ্ঞানই শক্তি (Knowledge is Power)
- Established: 1967; 59 years ago
- Founder: People's Republic of Bangladesh
- School board: Chittagong Education Board
- Session: January–December
- School code: 3100
- Headmaster: Rokshana Akhter
- Staff: 35
- Teaching staff: 53
- Grades: 5–10
- Gender: Male Only
- Age: 10 to 16
- Enrollment: more than 6000
- Language: Bengali
- Campus size: 20 acres
- Campus type: Urban
- Colors: Navy blue, white
- Sports: Cricket, football, hockey
- Special project: Connecting classrooms under British Council

Nasirabad Government High School (NGHS) (Bengali: নাসিরাবাদ সরকারী উচ্চ বিদ্যালয়) is a government-run high school in Bangladesh. It is managed by a committee and is situated in the East Nasirabad area in Chittagong - a port city and the country's second largest city. It is a school exclusively for boy and enrolls approximately 3000 students. Educational activities are conducted in two shifts.

== History ==
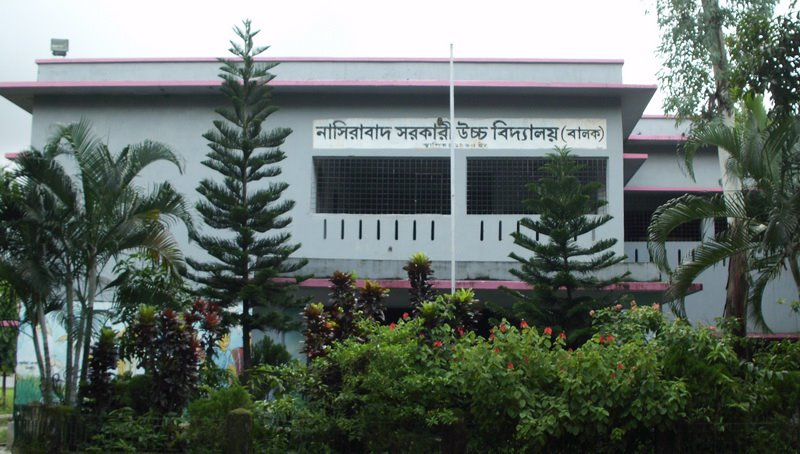
Front view of the school building

NGHS was founded in 1967 by the government of Pakistan. After the liberation war of Bangladesh it came under the control of the government of Bangladesh.

== Campus ==
The school campus covers 20 acres and includes a library, auditorium, prayer room and individual laboratories for physics, chemistry, biology, computer science and other subjects.

The school has a sports field at the south end of campus. Tamim Iqbal, the former vice-captain of the Bangladesh cricket team, played his first real cricket match there. He scored his first six here and has since called it his "favourite ground".

== Admission ==
Students have to qualify in a competitive admission test to be admitted.

== Notable alumni ==
- Akram Khan: Former Player, Captain, of Bangladesh cricket team & the chief selector of the BCB.
- Partha Barua: Singer, Band Member of Souls band.
- Aftab Ahmed: Represented Bangladesh Cricket team in World Cup, member of the touring cricket team to New Zealand in 2010.

== See also ==
- High schools in Bangladesh
- Bainnachola-Manikpur High School
- Chittagong Government High School
