= K G Mustafa =

Bangladeshi journalist

- Born: c. 1928; Kuripara, Sirajganj, Bengal Presidency, British India
- Died: 13 March 2010 (aged 82); Dhaka, Bangladesh
- Resting place: Martyred Intellectuals' Graveyard, Mirpur
- Education: MA (political science)
- Alma mater: University of Dhaka
- Spouse: Sabera Mustafa
- Children: Shams Mustafa; Sabir Mustafa; Sipar Mustafa

K G Mustafa (c. 1928 – 13 March 2010) was a Bangladeshi journalist who served as Ambassador for a brief period. He was awarded Ekushey Padak by the Government of Bangladesh in 1999.

== Early life and education ==
Mustafa was born to Khondakar Wasiuzzaman and Tahiatunnesa. He passed matriculation examination in 1944 from Banwarilal High School. He obtained BA (Hons) degree in political science from the University of Dhaka in 1951. He obtained MA degree in political science in 1957.

== Career ==
Mustafa started journalist as a profession while studying at Islamia College. He first joined the Daily Azad. He later also worked in the Dainik Insaf, Dainik Ittefaq, Bangladesh Observer, Dainik Purbokone, the weekly Dialogue, the Sangbad and Muktokantha. He was elected president of the All-Pakistan Federal Union of Journalists in 1970. He was the founder president of Bangladesh Federal Union of Journalists.

Mustafa was not a career diplomat. He was, however, a political appointee to the foreign service on contract. Bangabandhu Sheikh Mujibur Rahman's government appointed him to serve as an ambassador to Lebanon from 1973 to 1974, and again to Iraq from 1974 to 1975. Following a series of coup d'état in Bangladesh from August to November 1975 in which Rahman and his family were murdered, Mustafa chose not to return home and remained in Iraq as a private citizen until 1985.

== Personal life ==
Mustafa was married to actress and educationist Sabera Khatun (1934–2012). They had three sons – Sabir Mustafa, head of BBC Bengali Service, economist Shams Mustafa and advocate Sipar Mustafa.
