= Government High School Pakkay Wala =

- Jhang Sadar, Punjab; Pakistan

Information
- School type: Government High School
- Motto: Enter to Read, Leave to Lead
- Established: 1926
- Head: Ch. Abdul Rehman
- Teaching staff: 18
- Gender: Boys
- Enrolment: 581
- Sports: Association football, cricket
- Emiscode: 33220019

The Government High School Pakkay Wala is a boys-only high school. It is situated on the Jhang-Sargodha Road near Jhang Sadar, Punjab, Pakistan.

The school was established in 1926. The enrollment is around 581. Ch. Abdul Rehman the current Head. The school faculty has about 18 members.
