= Lohagara =

Lohagara may also refer to:

- Lohagara, Chittagong, a town in Bangladesh
- Lohagara Upazila, Chittagong, a upazila in Bangladesh
- Lohagara Upazila, Narail, a upazila in Bangladesh
- Lohagara Union, a union in Narail district
- Lohagara railway station, a railway station in Narail district
- Lohagara railway Station (Chattogram) a railway station in Chattogram district
