= Dr. Khastagir Government Girls' High School =

- ডা. খাস্তগীর সরকার বালিকা উচ্চ বিদ্যালয়
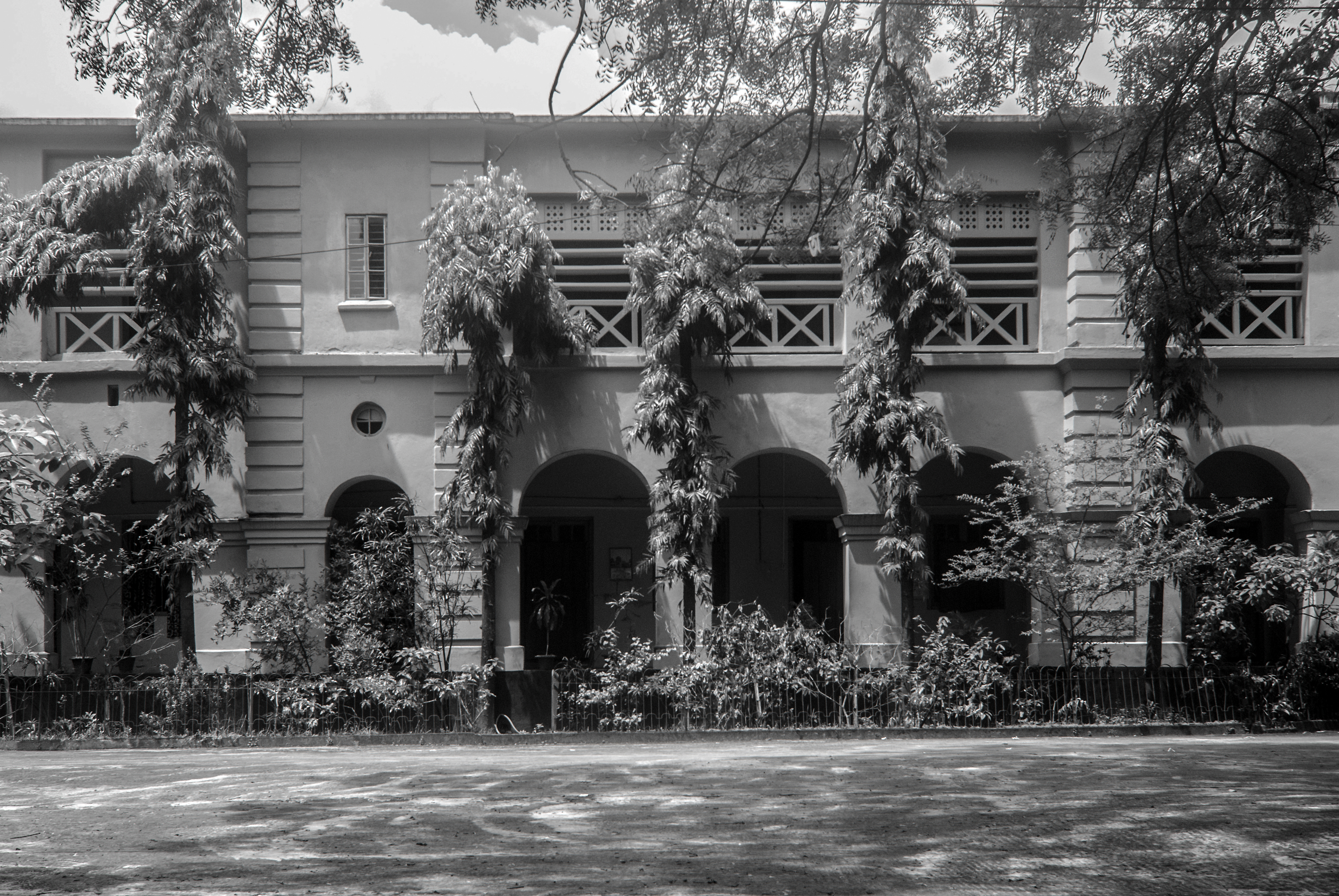

Location
- Chattogram; Bangladesh; 22.3479°N 91.8345°E

Information
- Type: Public, girls', double shifted school
- Motto: জ্ঞান চরিত্র সেবা (Knowledge, Integrity, Service)
- Established: 1907 (119 years ago)
- Founder: Annadacharan Khastgir
- School district: Chattogram
- Head of school: Shahada Aktar
- Staff: ~80
- Faculty: Commerce, humanities, science
- Grades: 5–10
- Enrollment: ~2,000
- Language: Bangla
- Website: drkhastagirschool.edu.bd

Dr. Khastagir Government Girls' High School is a governmental secondary school in Chattogram, Bangladesh. It is near Jamal Khan, in the central part of the city. It was established by Annadacharan Khastgir.

== History ==
The school celebrated 100 years in operation in 2007. Many of its alumnae gathered to join in the three-day-long celebration. The celebration ended with participating students, teachers and guests singing Tagore's "Purano Sei Diner Kotha".

== Academics ==
The school follows the general national curriculum of the Bangladeshi education system and provides education to girls from primary (starting from grade 5) to secondary level (grades 6 to 10).

There are two academic terms in the year. The first starts around mid-June and ends at the beginning of July. The final term starts around last-November and ends at the beginning of November.

The students have a month-long summer holiday after the first term and winter holidays after their final term.

== Notable alumni ==
- Novera Ahmed – sculptor; credited for the original design of the Shaheed Minar monument
- Shamsunnahar Mahmud – writer, politician and educator
- Pratibha Mutsuddi – Bengali language movement hero, educator and women activist; recipient, Ekushey Padak award
- Ivy Rahman – politician; affiliated with the Bangladesh Awami League
- Pritilata Waddedar – anti-British revolutionary

== See also ==
- Education in Bangladesh
- List of schools in Chittagong
