= Chittagong Steel Mills High School =

Location
- Patenga; Bangladesh
- Coordinates: 22.2714°N 91.7906°E

Information
- Established: 1972
- School district: Chittagong
- Website: slmhs.bise-ctg.gov.bd

Chittagong Steel Mills High School is a secondary school in Patenga Thana of Chittagong, Bangladesh. It was established in 1972.
