= Patenga Thana =

Thana in Chattogram Division, Bangladesh

Patenga পতেঙ্গা
- Thana
- Location in Bangladesh
- Coordinates: 22°15′30″N 91°48′00″E
- Country: Bangladesh
- Division: Chittagong Division
- District: Chittagong District
- Elevation: 15 m (49 ft)

Population (2022)
  - Total: 164,019
- Time zone: UTC+6 (BST)
- Postal code: 4204
- Area code: 031
- Website: Official map of Patenga

Patenga (Bengali: পতেঙ্গা) is a thana of Chattogram District in Chattogram Division, Bangladesh. Patenga is known as the Golden gateway of Bangladesh. For over thousands of years traders from all over the world including Portuguese, British, French, Roman came to this land entering through patenga

== Demographics ==
Religions in Patenga Thana (2022)
Religion	Percent
Islam	92.46%
Hinduism	6.55%
Buddhism	0.81%
Other or not stated	0.18%

According to the 2022 Bangladeshi census, Patenga Thana had 42,884 households and a population of 164,019. 8.83% of the population were under 5 years of age. Patenga had a literacy rate (age 7 and over) of 84.82%: 86.87% for males and 82.55% for females, and a sex ratio of 109.79 males for every 100 females.

== Education ==
According to Banglapedia, BAF Shaheen College, Chittagong, Chittagong Steel Mills High School, Eastern Refinery Model High School, Patenga High School, and Rangamati Government High School are notable secondary schools.

== See also ==
- Upazilas of Bangladesh
- Districts of Bangladesh
- Divisions of Bangladesh
