= Union Technical High School =

School in Bangladesh

Coordinates: 23.6149°N 90.7486°E

Union Technical High School (Bengali: ইউনিয়ন কারিগরি উচ্চ বিদ্যালয়) is a secondary educational institution situated at the village of Satani in Titas Upazila, Comilla District, Bangladesh. It was established in 1993. More than 1000 students from the nearby villages study in this school. The school provides education for five academic years (from 6th to 10th grade). There is a large playground in front of the school.
