= Feni Government Pilot High School =

- ফেনী সরকারি পাইলট উচ্চ বিদ্যালয়
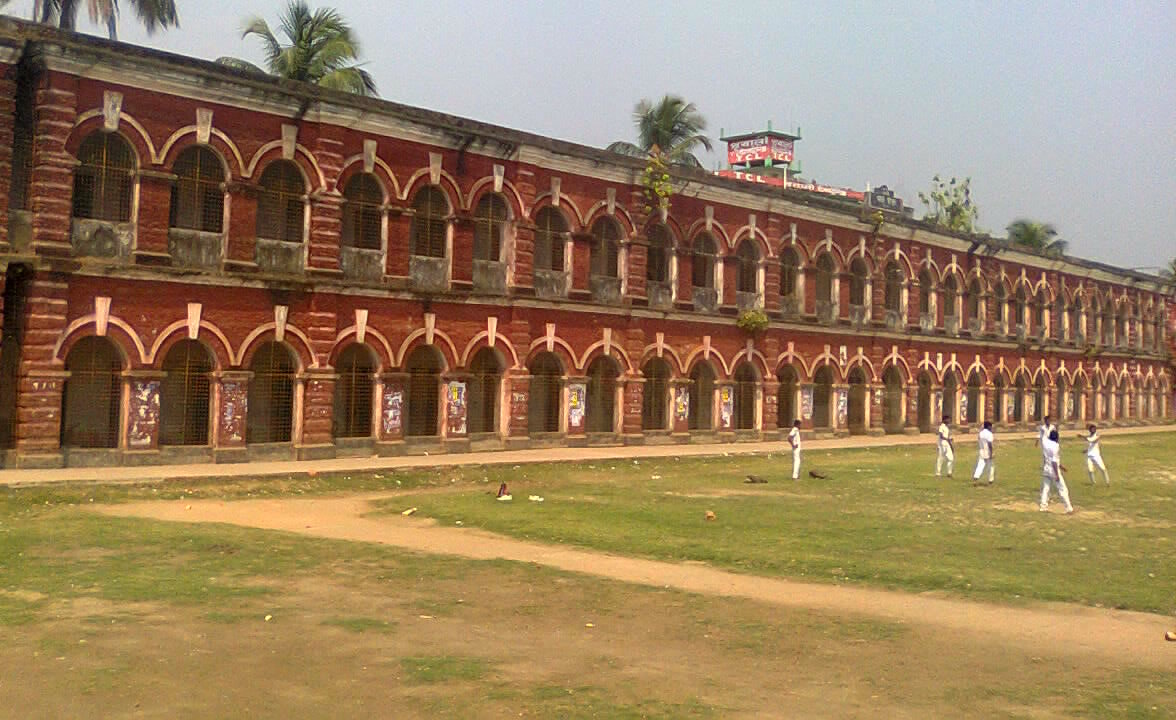
- Building of the school

Location
- College Road; Feni Sadar, Feni District, Chittagong, 3900; Bangladesh; 23°0′36″N 91°23′24″E

Information
- Other name: FGPHS
- Type: Government secondary school
- Established: 1886
- School board: Comilla Education Board
- Headmaster: Ferdous Ara Begum
- Class: 6–10
- Enrollment: ≈ 1,600
- Language: Bengali
- Website: fgphs.edu.bd

Feni Government Pilot High School (FGPHS, Bengali: ফেনী সরকারি পাইলট উচ্চ বিদ্যালয়) is a secondary school in Feni Sadar, Feni District, Chittagong, Bangladesh. It is in the center of Feni and was established in 1886. Nabinchandra Sen, poet and Deputy Commissioner of Feni, established the school. Feni Government College is also on the same campus.
