= Bainnachola-Manikpur High School =

Educational establishment in Chattogram, Bangladesh

Coordinates: 22.7602°N 91.8702°E

- বাইন্যাছোলা-মানিকপুর উচ্চ বিদ্যালয়
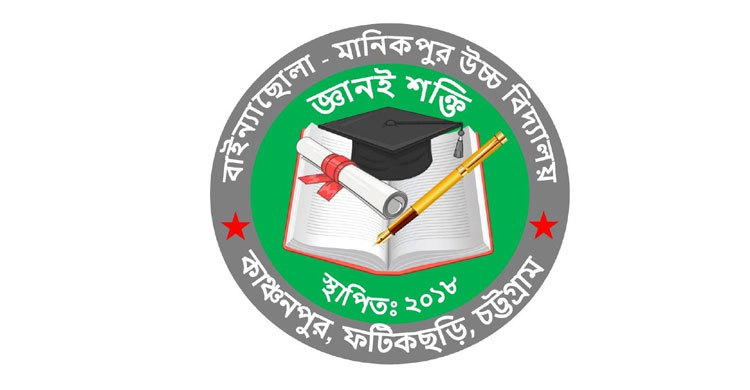
- Fatikchhari, Chattogram; Bangladesh

Information
- Established: October 29, 2018
- Status: Open
- Educational Institute Identification Number: 138822

Bainnachola-Manikpur High School (Note: Bengali: বাইন্যাছোলা-মানিকপুর উচ্চ বিদ্যালয়, romanized: Bā'in'yācōlā-mānikapura ucca bidyālaẏa) (Note: Multiple references:) is a private secondary school located in Fatikchhari, Chattogram District, Chattogram Division, Bangladesh. It was established in October 2018 by the Bangladesh Army and locals.

== History ==
Bainnachola-Manikpur High School was established on October 29, 2018, The school initially began with 387 students, 1 head teacher and 8 assistant teachers. Books were also distributed soon after the inauguration on 10 January 2019.
