= Government High School Bogray =

Government High School Bogray, Daska, Sialkot
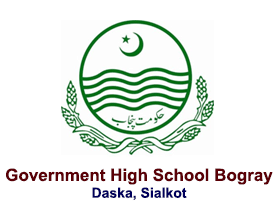
- گورنمنٹ ہائی اسکول بوگرے

Location
- Bogray; Daska, Sialkot, Punjab 051010; Pakistan
- Coordinates: 32°20′16″N 74°29′53″E

Information
- Type: Government High School
- Motto: Courage to Know
- Established: 1921
- Head teacher: IFTIKHAR AHMAD
- Faculty: 40
- Grades: Primary, middle, matric
- Gender: Male
- Enrollment: 1,046
- Campus size: 10,880 sq ft (1,011 m^{2})
- Campus type: Rural
- Colors: Maroon and Blue
- Emiscode: 34310017
- Institute code: 161006

Government High School Bogray (Urdu: گورنمنٹ ہائی اسکول بوگرے; abbreviated to GHS Bogray), is a high school for boys located in a small town Bogray, Tehsil Daska, Sialkot, Punjab, Pakistan.

== History ==
Initially GHS Bogray was established as Government Primary School in 1921 in British era, Middle upgraded in 1952. It was granted High School status by Government of the Punjab in 1986. With the efforts of school management it was converted into Model School and added few more buildings in 2011.

== Academics ==
The school prepares the boys for the Primary, Middle and Secondary School Examinations conducted by the District Education Board and Board of Intermediate and Secondary Education, Gujranwala. Students excel in each examination of the local board and have achieved distinctions in further education. After completing education from the school, many Bogrians have gone on to secure top positions in all major universities of Pakistan.

== Infrastructure ==
The school is spread over an area of about 4 acres (16,187 m^{2}). It has Physics, Biology, Chemistry, Computer Labs and a Library.

Basic Facilities
Drinking Water	Available
Electricity	Available
Boundary Wall	Available
Main Gate	Available
Play Ground	Available
Toilets	Available
Teachers w/o furniture	2
Students w/o furniture	273

Academic Facilities
Classrooms	14
No.of Books	1000
Sections	22
Comp. Lab	Yes
Library	Yes
Comp. Students	111

== Photo gallery ==
Photo Gallery Govt. High School Bogray
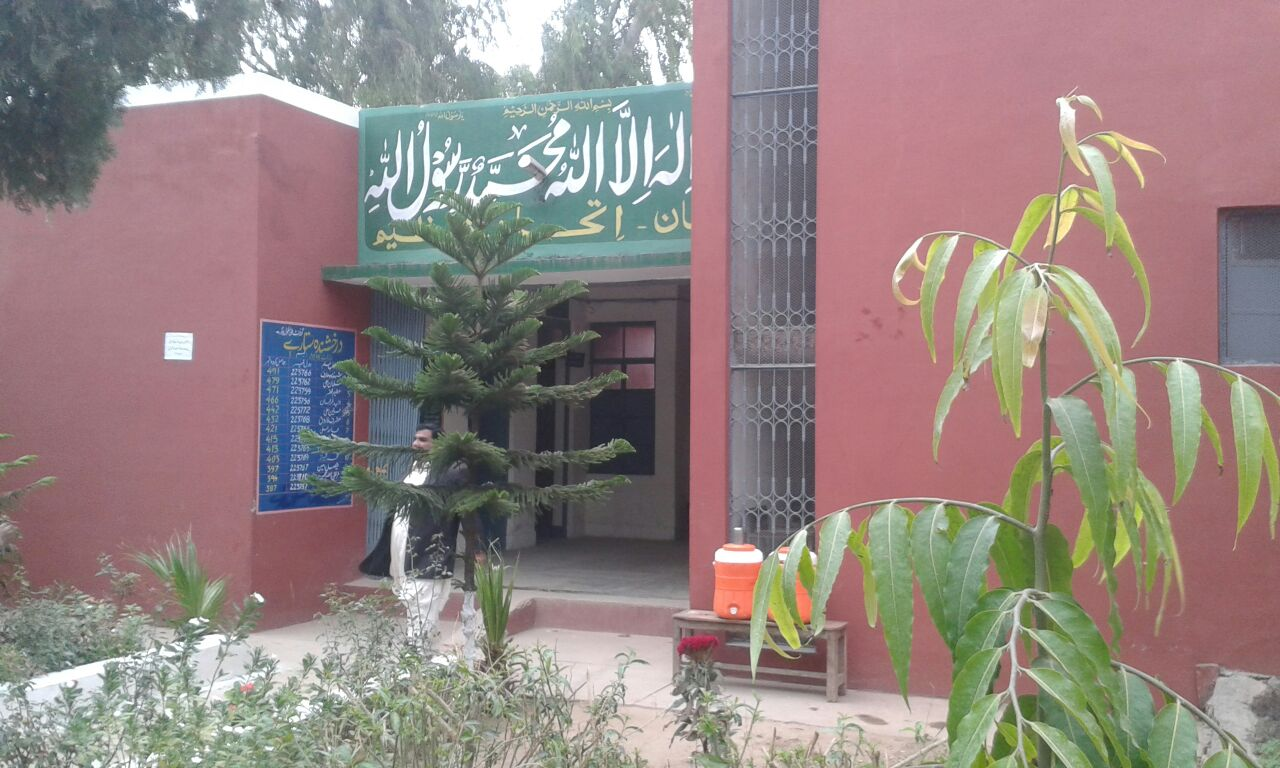
Govt high school bogray

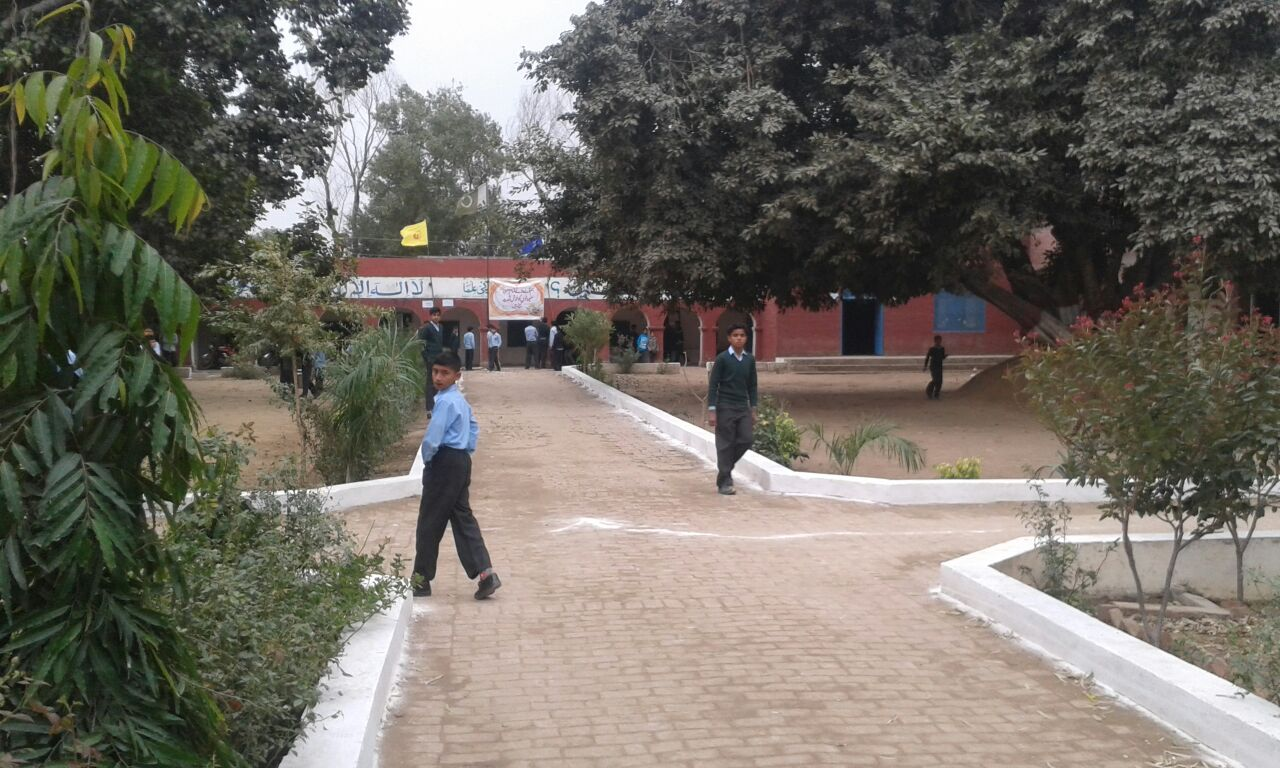
Govt high school bogray

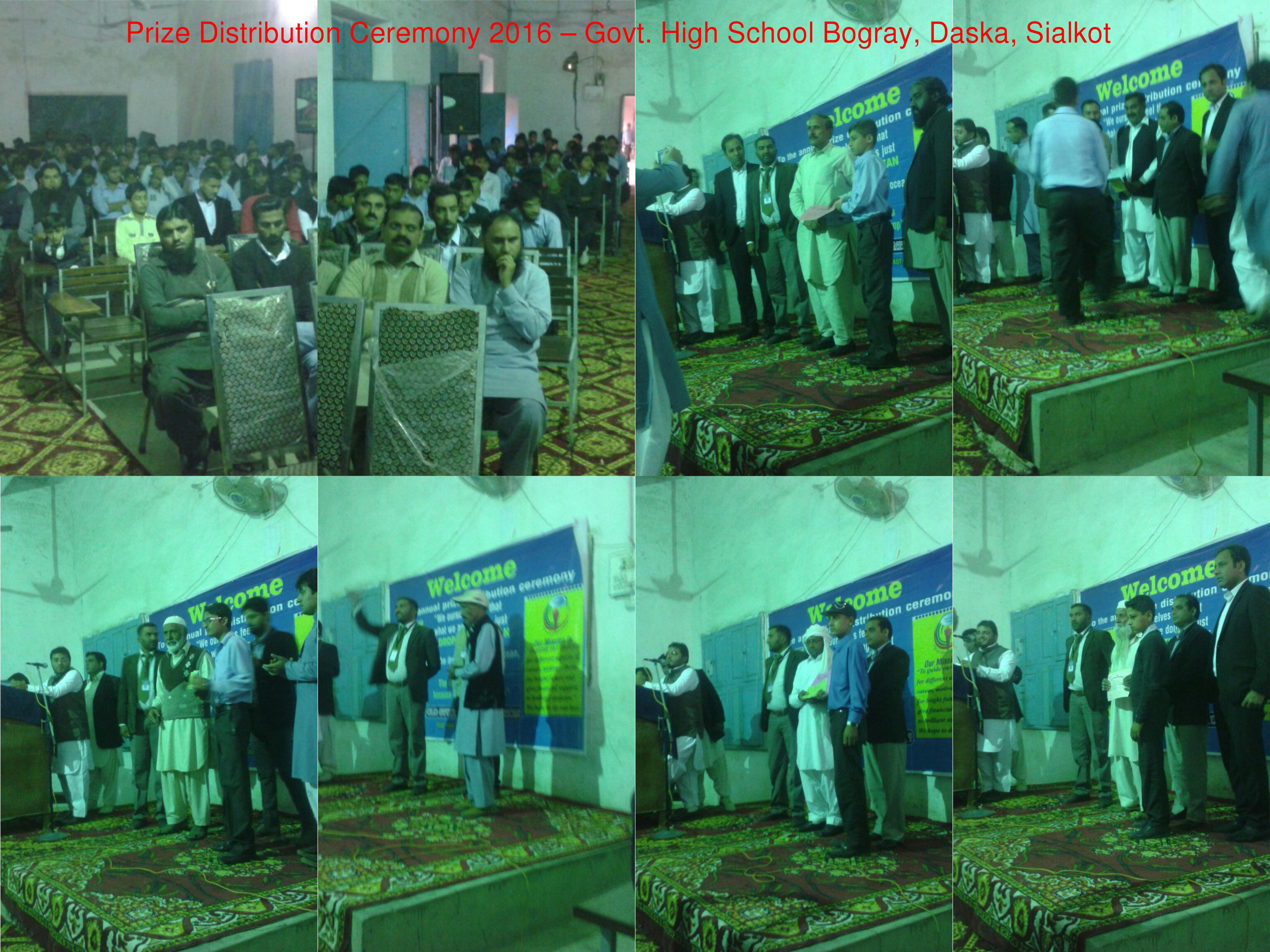
Prize Distribution Ceremony 2016

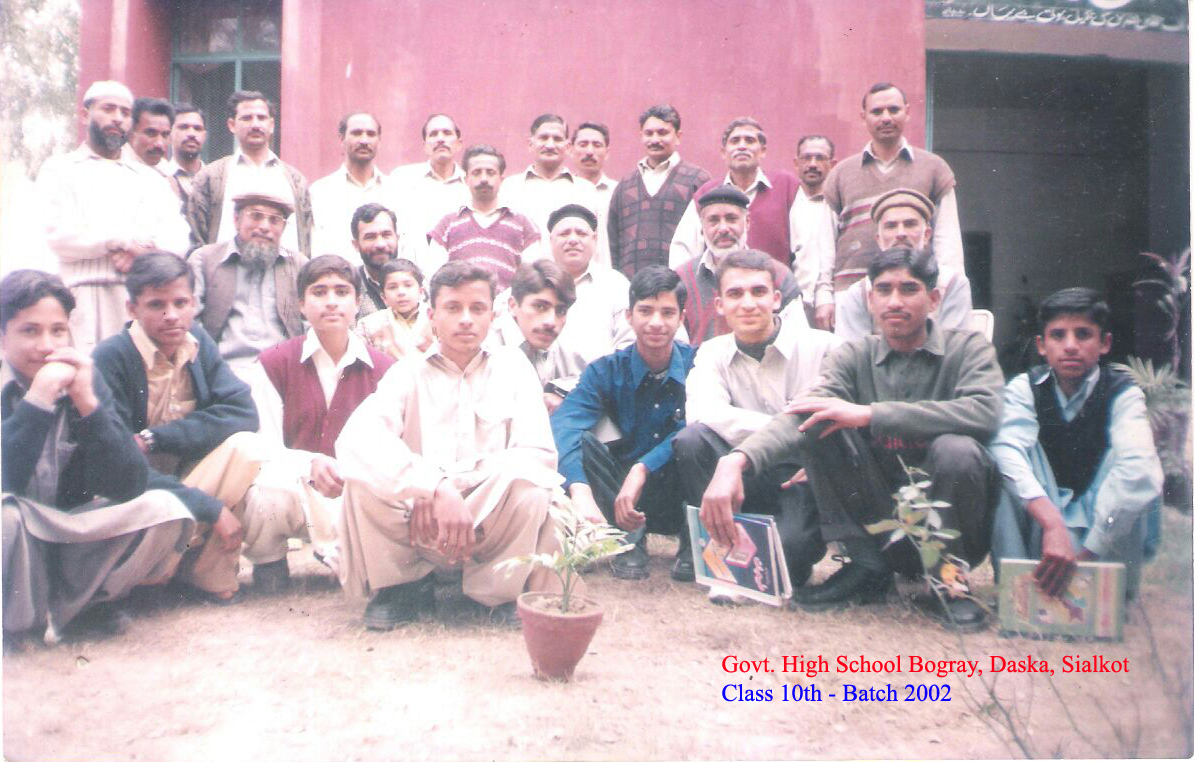
Group Photo Batch 2002

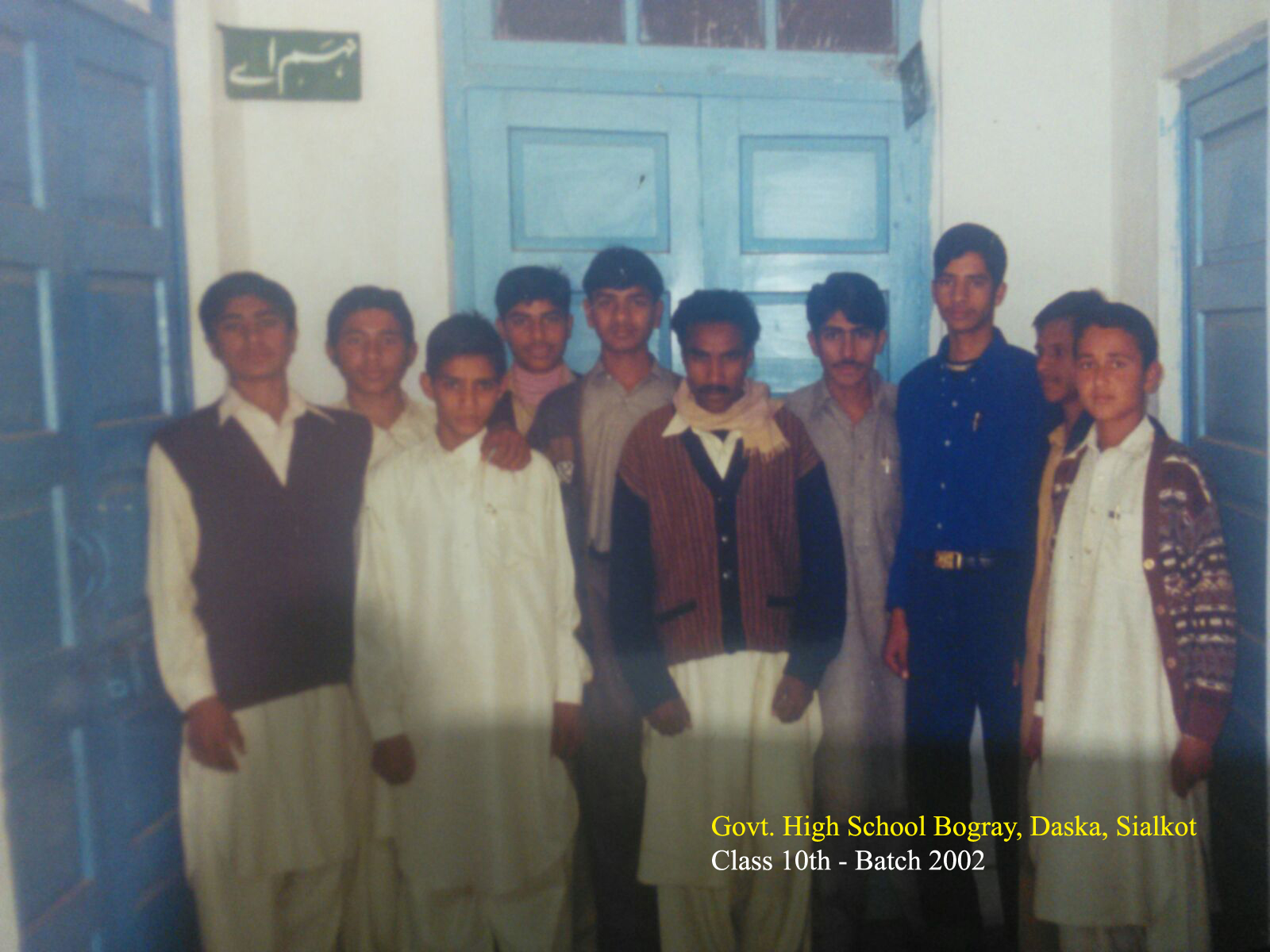
Group Photo Batch 2002
