= Chittagong Government High School =

- চট্টগ্রাম সরকারি উচ্চ বিদ্যালয়

Location
- College Road, Chittagong; Chattogram (Chittagong); Bangladesh; 22.3531°N 91.8363°E

Information
- Other name: Govt. High
- Former name: M.E School
- Type: Public secondary school
- Motto: নিজকে জান (Know Thyself)
- Established: 1906; 120 years ago
- School board: Board of Intermediate and Secondary Education, Chattogram
- School code: 104519
- Head of school: Muhammad Nurul Amin (since 2025)
- Staff: 62
- Faculty: Science & Business Studies
- Teaching staff: 52
- Grades: 5-10
- Gender: Boys
- Language: Bengali
- Campus size: 1 acre
- Campus type: Urban
- Colors: Khaki and white
- Sports: Football, cricket
- Team name: Red Crescent Youth, Chattogram Government High School Unit & Bangladesh Scouts, CGHS
- Publication: Protibhash (school magazine)
- Demonym: CGHSian
- Website: chittagongghs.edu.bd

Chittagong Government High School, also known as Chattogram Government High School or just CGHS, is a public secondary school located on College Road in Chawkbazar Thana of Chattogram, Bangladesh. This schoolas established in 1906. In 2018, the school celebrated its 111th anniversary.

== History ==
The school was established in 1906 under the name Chittagong Modern English School or Chittagong Middle English School (M.E. School). In 1918, it was declared a government institution after conversion in 1917. In 1958, permission was granted to open additional private branches for grades 4 to 6. In 1966, it was designated as Chattogram Junior Government High School. In 1977, it was renamed Chattogram Government High School. The first batch of students were admitted to the Secondary School Certificate (SSC) program in 1981. In 2009, a dual-shift system was introduced. At present, there are two shifts and four sections per each grades (5 to 10).

== Academic activities and results ==
During the British colonial period, this school played a unique role in expanding education in the Chattogram region. At present, nearly 2,100 students study here from grades five to ten. Classes are conducted in two shifts: morning and day. In grades nine and ten, the school offers both Science and Business Studies divisions.

Traditionally, students were admitted to grade five through competitive examinations held every December. However, since the outbreak of the coronavirus in 2020, the admission process has been conducted through a lottery system until 2026, where in 2026, admission exams are expected to continue again. The entire admission procedure is managed and regulated by the District Administration, Chattogram.

Students of Chattogram Government High School previously participated in three public examinations: the Secondary School Certificate (SSC), the Junior School Certificate (JSC, formerly Junior Scholarship Examination), and the Primary School Certificate (PSC, formerly Primary Scholarship Examination). After the discontinuation of PSC and JSC, the school now participates only in the SSC examination, where its students consistently achieve excellent results each year.

== Extra-curricular activities ==
These include inter-school debate championships, recitation contests, inter-school cricket tournaments, inter-school football tournaments, Math Olympiad, Science Olympiad, Physics Olympiad, Chemistry Olympiad, Biology Olympiad, Astronomy Olympiad, Astrophysics Olympiad and science fair.

Chittagong Government High School is one of the best schools in debating in Chittagong District. It has become champion in the Drishty Inter School Debate Contest eight times: in 1993, 1994, 1995, 2002, 2008, 2009, 2014, and 2018.

== Notable alumni ==
- Aftab Ahmed (born 1985), international cricketer
- Subir Chowdhury, chairman and CEO of ASI Consulting Group, LLC, author, helped establish the first Center for Bangladesh Studies in the United States at the University of California, Berkeley
- Yasir Ali Chowdhury, Bangladeshi cricketer
- Niaz Ahmed Khan, 30th vice-chancellor of University of Dhaka
- Adil Hossain Noble, Bangladeshi model
- Minar Rahman, Bangladeshi singer, songwriter, composer, cartoonist
- Muhammad Yunus, (born 28 June 1940), an economist and statesman who has been serving as the fifth Chief Adviser of Bangladesh since 2024.

== See also ==
- Education in Bangladesh
- List of schools in Chittagong
- Chattogram Government High School Official Website
