= Chattogram Collegiate School =

Coordinates: 22.3331°N 91.8253°E

- চট্টগ্রাম কলেজিয়েট স্কুল
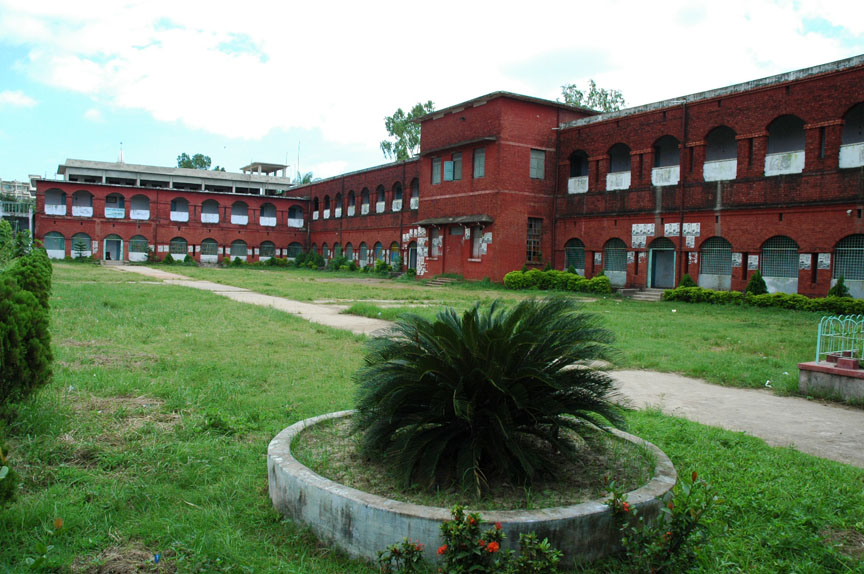
- Academic Building-1 of Chattogram Collegiate School

Location
- Collegiate School Road, Double Mooring, GPO; Chattogram; Bangladesh

Information
- Type: Public
- Motto: Truth shall prevail (সত্যের জয় হবেই)
- Established: 1836; 190 years ago
- School number: 104275
- Headmaster: Mohammad Tazalli Azad(Acting)
- Grades: 5th to 12th grade
- Gender: Male
- Language: Bangla
- Website: ctgcs.edu.bd

Chattogram Collegiate School also known as Chittagong Collegiate School and College is a government educational institution in Chattogram, the southern port city in Bangladesh. It provides education from 5th to 12th grade. The school was established in 1836 and in 2016 celebrated its 180 years of establishment.

== History ==
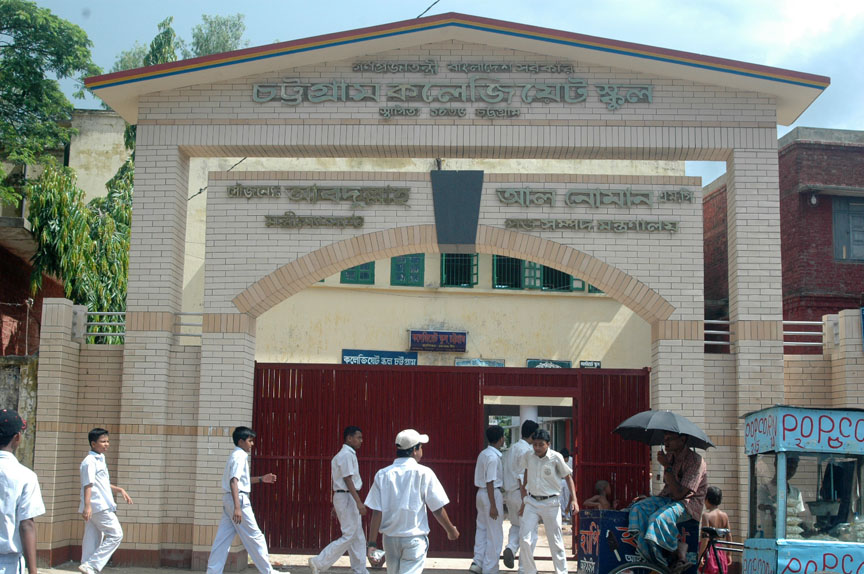
Entrance of the institution

Chittagong Collegiate School was established as Chittagong Government School in 1836. The school was the first English medium high school in Chittagong. Its classes were held in a brick building constructed during the early years of British rule. The school was then shifted to a new location at the southern section of the market Sahib Hills. In 1886, the school was relocated to its present location at Collegiate School Road, North Nalapara, near the Chittagong Railway Station, and was named as Chittagong Collegiate School. Until the first decade of the twentieth century, the school was popularly known as the Entrance School.

In 2008 the college section was introduced and the government renamed the school Chittagong Collegiate School and College.

== Facilities ==
The main building of the institute is Academic Building-1 where the classes of school levels are held. There are nearly 21 classrooms in that red-brick building. The campus includes a mosque, several science labs and computer labs.

== Notable alumni ==
- Abdullah-Al-Muti, first Bangladeshi to be awarded with the Kalinga Prize by UNESCO. He was a popular science communicator towards his audience of Bengali speaking children and teenagers.
- Abdullah Al Noman,Former Vice chairman of Bangladesh Nationalist Party, one of the two most popular political parties of Bangladesh. Noman served as a member of parliament and ministry cabinet in several terms. He also served as the minister of live stock and fisheries.
- Abul Hayat, one of the leading pioneers of theatre & drama in independent Bangladesh. Hayat's decades long career of acting & directing has shaped the national drama industry in a pivotal way.
- Amir Khasru Mahmud Chowdhury, current Minister of Finance and former Minister of Commerce.
- Asif Iqbal (lyricist), founder of Gaanchill Music.
- Ataur Rahman (actor), influential stage drama personality in Bangladesh. He has been awarded with Ekushey Padak & Independence Award for his cultural contributions.
- Hossain Zillur Rahman, Bangladeshi academic, economist & policy maker. Former adviser to the Caretaker Government of Bangladesh.
- Humayun Ahmed, renowned author & filmmaker, Ahmed was celebrated as the most influential cultural icon in post independence Bangladesh.
- Jamal Nazrul Islam, Bangladeshi Cosmologist & Academician. Islam returned to Bangladesh to establish scientific advancement throughout his motherland, despite serving faculty in prestigious universities, such as- King's College, London, Institute of Astronomy, Cambridge, California Institute of Technology. Books authored by Islam are highly cited in universities worldwide.
- Jamal Uddin Ahmad, Deputy Prime Minister of Bangladesh from 1977 to 1982.
- M Harunur Rashid, former Director General of Bangla Academy.
- MA Malek (journalist), Editor of Dainik Azadi. Malek was awarded with Ekushey Padak in 2022 for his contributions to journalism.
- Mayeen Uddin Khan Badal, freedom fighter & former Member of Parliament.
- Minhajul Abedin, former Bangladeshi cricketer.
- Mohammad Ziauddin (army officer), retired Bangladeshi military officer. He is the recipient of Bir Uttom, the highest military award for living military personnel, for his prolific bravery in the liberation war of Bangladesh.
- Mohit Ul Alam, former Vice Chancellor of Jatiya Kabi Kazi Nazrul Islam University.
- Morshed Khan, former Minister of Foreign Affairs.
- Mosharraf Hossain (politician, born 1943), senior Bangladesh Awami League politician.
- Muhammad Afsarul Ameen, senior Bangladesh Awami League politician and physician. He served as a Minister of Prime & Mass Education.
- Muhammad Yunus, only Bangladeshi to be awarded with the Nobel Prize. He pioneered the concept of Microcredit & Microfinance in economics. He was the Chief Adviser of the interim government of Bangladesh from 2024 to 2026.
- Muhammed Zafar Iqbal, popular Bangladeshi science fiction writer. Iqbal has been part of popularizing STEM among the youth, such as, encouraging participations in math olympiad and more alike.
- Mustafa Nur-Ul Islam, National Professor of Bangladesh.
- Nabinchandra Sen, Bengali poet and writer. Sen is considered to be one of the greatest poets prior to the arrival of Rabindranath Tagore.
- Niaz Murshed, Bangladeshi Grandmaster (chess).
- Shahid Saber, writer & journalist. He was martyred during the onset of liberation war of 1971.
- Zakir Husain (governor), Husain served as a Governor & Interior Minister of East Pakistan during the Ayub Khan regime. A street in Chattogram is named in his remembrance.

== See also ==
- History of education in Chittagong
- List of schools in Chittagong
