= Hazi Mohammad Mohsin Government High School =

Public school in Bangladesh

Hazi Mohammad Mohsin Government High School, Chittagong
- হাজী মুহাম্মদ মহসিন সরকারি উচ্চ বিদ্যালয়, চট্টগ্রাম; Haji Muhammad Mohsin Government High School

Location
- 03, College Road, Chawkbazar; Chittagong, 4203; Bangladesh; 22°21′1″N 91°50′5″E

Information
- Type: Public Secondary School, Doubleshift
- Motto: প্রভু আমাকে জ্ঞান দান কর (Lord give me knowledge)
- Religious affiliation: Islam (1874–2007; presently not considered)
- Established: 1874; 152 years ago
- Founder: British Government
- School board: Chittagong Education Board
- School code: EIIN: 104488
- Headmaster: Mohammad Azizul Haque Nizami
- Teaching staff: 23
- Employees: 6
- Grades: 5th–10th
- Gender: Boys' school
- Enrollment: ≈ 890 (2022)
- Education system: NCTB Bangla Version
- Language: Bengali
- Campus size: 0.89 acres (0.36 ha)
- Campus type: Urban
- Colors: Sky-blue, White and Navy blue
- Sports: football, cricket, badminton
- Publication: Ujjiban
- Website: hmmghs.edu.bd hmmghs.school.gov.bd

Hazi Mohammad Mohsin Government High School is a public secondary school, located in Chittagong, Bangladesh. It was founded in 1874 as the Chittagong Madrasa. In 1962, it was converted into a high school. In 1979, it was named after Muhammad Mohsin.

== History ==
The school was established as the Chittagong Madrasah by the British Government in Chittagong in 1874. In 1927, it was converted into a new scheme madrasa by indcluding English in curriculum and named Islamic Intermediate College. In 1979, the Islamic Intermediate College was divided into a college and a high school. In 1996, the school was separated from college's administration by giving an autonomous administration and was relocated by the Ministry of Education. Which is the current school. Until 2007, the school had the practice of admitting only Muslim students. In 2008, the school was upgraded to double shift school.

== Curriculum ==
The school conducts education only in the Bengali version of the National Curriculum. The school is affiliated with the Chittagong Education Board. It teaches classes from 5th to 10th for boys in two shifts.

== See also ==
- List of schools in Chittagong
- Education in Bangladesh
