= Board of Intermediate and Secondary Education, Chattogram =

Education board

Coordinates: 22.368994°N 91.829205°E

- মাধ্যমিক ও উচ্চ মাধ্যমিক শিক্ষা বোর্ড, চট্টগ্রাম
- Emblem of the Chattogram Education Board

Board overview
- Formed: 1995; 31 years ago
- Jurisdiction: Government of Bangladesh
- Headquarters: Forest Gate, CDA Ave, Chattogram
- Board executive: Professor Abdullah Al Mamun Chowdhury, Chairman
- Parent department: Ministry of Education
- Website: bise-ctg.gov.bd

The Board of Intermediate and Secondary Education, Chattogram (Bengali: মাধ্যমিক ও উচ্চ মাধ্যমিক শিক্ষা বোর্ড, চট্টগ্রাম, romanized: Madhyamik O Uccha Madhyamik Shikkha Board, Chattogram), also known as BISE, Chittagong is an autonomous organization in Chittagong, Bangladesh, mainly responsible for organization, control, supervision and development of secondary and higher secondary education and for holding public examinations (JSC, SSC & HSC) in the Greater Chittagong region including 5 districts of the Chittagong Division. The board started its operation in the year 1995 and took charge of schools of 5 districts, previously controlled by the BISE, Comilla. The board controls 1125 secondary and 279 higher secondary schools.

== Background ==
Gazette of establishment of BISE, Chittagong in 1995.

As per Section 3A(1) of the East Pakistan Intermediate and Secondary Education Ordinance, 1961, the board is responsible for the organization, regulation, supervision, control and development of Intermediate, Secondary and Junior level public examinations of educational institutions within Chattogram, Cox's Bazar, Rangamati, Khagrachari and Bandarban districts.

== District under Chattogram Education Board ==
The 5 districts of Greater Chittagong, where schools are controlled by BISE, Chittagong are:

- Bandarban District
- Chittagong District
- Cox's Bazar District
- Khagrachhari District
- Rangamati Hill District

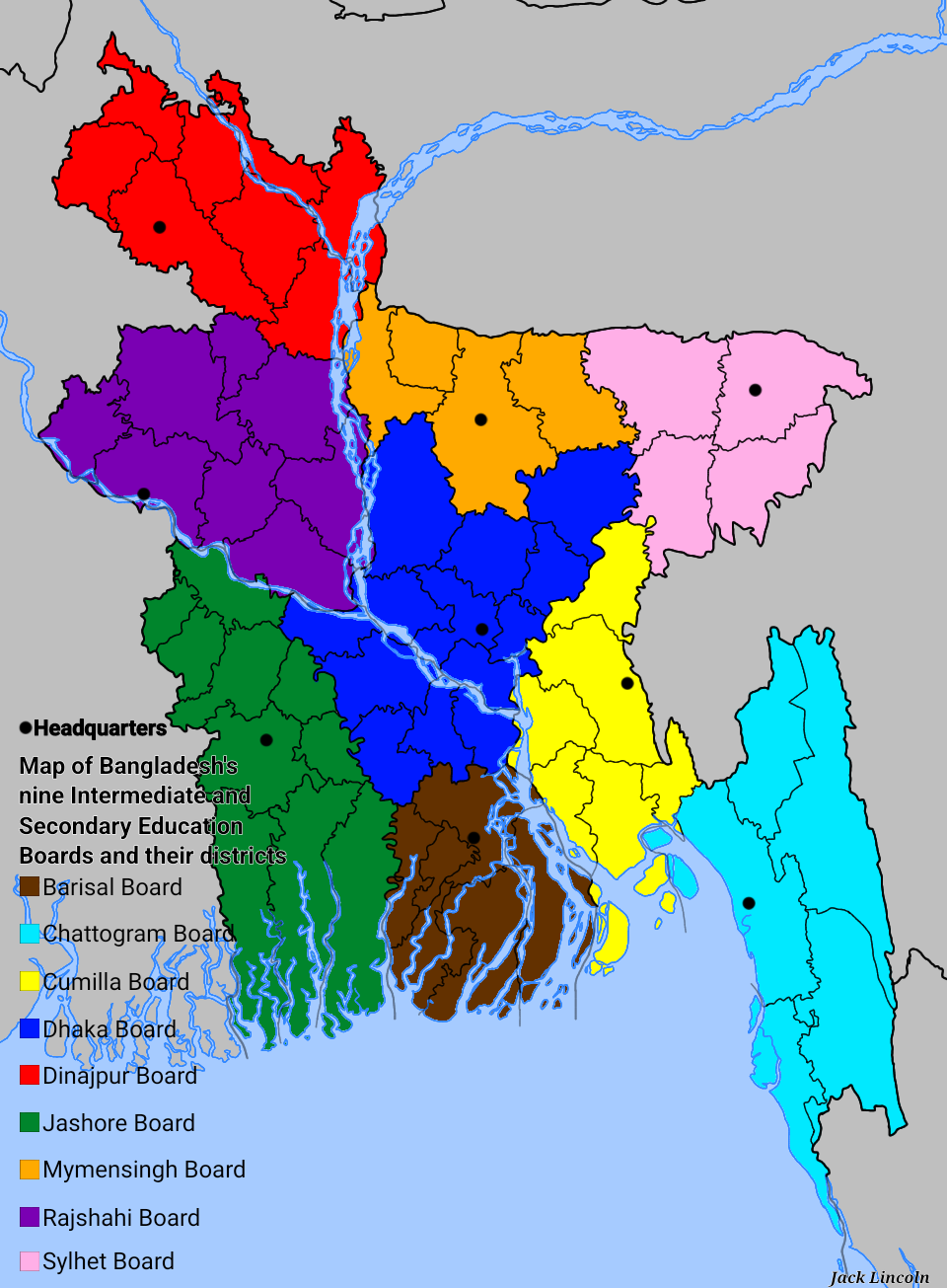
Map of Bangladesh's nine Intermediate and Secondary Education Boards and their districts

== See also ==
- List of Intermediate and Secondary Education Boards in Bangladesh
