= International schools in Bangladesh =

Bangladesh hosts numerous educational institutions that offer instruction primarily in English, with international syllabi playing a prominent role. Among these, Pearson Edexcel and Cambridge International Education are the most prevalent examination boards. While these two systems dominate, a small number of schools also employ alternative educational frameworks.

== Chittagong ==
=== Independent ===
Name	Location	Curriculum	Levels	Intake
Union Halls	Sitakunda	Blended (American/Canadian)	PreK-16	September
William Carey Academy	Nasirabad	American	K-12	August

=== Chittagong ===
Name	Location	Curriculum	Levels	Intake
Chittagong Grammar School	Kotwali	CIE	K-12	June/July
CIDER International School	Bayzid	CIE	K-12	June/July
Sunshine Grammar School	Nasirabad	CIE/Edexcel	K-12	June/July
International Hope School Bangladesh	Muradpur	CIE	K-12	June/July
Frobel Academy	Quaish	CIE	K-10	June/July
AUW Laboratory School	Chatteswari	CIE	5-10	June/July
Little Jewels School	Katalgonj	CIE/Edexcel	K-12	June/July
Presidency International School	Panchlaish	CIE	K-12	

== Dhaka ==
Name	Location	Curriculum	Levels	Intake
Oxford International School	Dhanmondi/Gulshan/Banasree/Uttara/Gandaria, Dhaka	Cambridge curriculum	Playgroup to A Level	
Grace International School	Gulshan, Dhaka	Cambridge International and Pearson Edexcel	Pre Nursery to Year 13 / A Level	
Glenrich International School	Satarkul Badda, Dhaka	Cambridge curriculum	Playgroup to Grade 8	
iSTEM English Medium School	Mirpur, Dhaka	Edexcel curriculum and Cambridge Curriculum Both	Playgroup to A Level	June–July; January–December
Aga Khan Academy	Baridhara, Dhaka	IB Curriculum	PYP to DP	
Babui International School	Jatrabari, Dhaka	International Baccalaureate (IB) Curriculum	EARLY YEARS PROGRAMME (EYP); PRIMARY YEARS PROGRAMME (PYP); MIDDLE YEARS PROGRAMME (MYP)	June–July; January–December
St Francis Xavier's Green Herald International School	Mohammadpur, Dhaka	Cambridge curriculum	Kindergarten to A Levels	
International School Dhaka	Block-E, Bashundhara R/A, Dhaka	IB curriculum	Playgroup to Grade 12 (IB Diploma)	
Apple Tree INTERNATIONAL School	Mirpur, Dhaka	Cambridge curriculum	Playgroup to O Level	
A. G. Church School Dhaka	New Eskaton Road, Dhaka	English Medium	Playgroup to A Level	
Heritage school	Chashara, Narayanganj		Playgroup to 10	edexcel curriculum
Aga Khan School	Uttara, Dhaka	Cambridge curriculum	Playgroup to A Level	
Alfred International School and College	Kadamtoli, Dhaka	Edexcel syllabus for English medium	Playgroup to A Level	
American International School of Dhaka	Baridhara, Dhaka	IB curriculum	Pre-kindergarten to Grade 12	
Angelica International School	Savar, Dhaka	Edexcel curriculum	Playgroup to A Level	
Arcadia International School & College	Kadomtoly, Dhaka	Edexcel curriculum	Playgroup to A Level	
The Ark Int'l School	Dhanmondi, Dhaka	Cambridge curriculum and syllabus combined with Bangladesh National curriculum	Playgroup to O level	
Australian International School	Khilkhet, Dhaka	IB curriculum	Playgroup to Year 12	
Averroes International School Mirpur	7/1, Pallabi, Section-12, Mirpur-12, Dhaka-1216 (Westside of Mirpur 12 Bus Stand)	Edexcel curriculum	Playgroup to A Level	July-June
Bacha English Medium School	105/4, Monipuripara, Tejgaon, Dhaka-1215	Cambridge curriculum	Nursery to A Level	
BAF Shaheen English Medium College	Jahangir Gate, Dhaka Cantonment, Dhaka-1206	Cambridge curriculum	Playgroup to A Level	
Bangladesh International School and College	New DOHS Mohakhali, Dhaka Cantonment, Dhaka	Edexcel for English medium students	1st to 12th grade	November
Bangladesh International Tutorial	House-02, Road-128, Gulshan-1, Dhaka-1212	Edexcel curriculum	Playgroup to A Level	July–August
British Columbia School	House-7, Road-16, Dhanmondi, Dhaka-1209		Playgroup to O Level	
British Primary School Dhaka (BPSD)	House-63, Block-D, Road-15, Banani, Dhaka-1215	Cambridge curriculum	Preschool to Class 2	
Canadian International School Bangladesh	Plot# 110, Road# 27, Block A, Banani, Dhaka 1212, Bangladesh	Nova Scotia K-12 curriculum (Canadian)	Pre-kindergarten to Grade 12	August–June
Canadian Maple International School	Madani Avenue Satarkul United City, Dhaka, Bangladesh	Cambridge Curriculum	Play Group to A Level	
Canadian Trillinium School	House-7 Road-62, Gulshan-2, Dhaka-1212	Canadian curriculum	Pre-kindergarten to Grade 12	
Cardiff International School Dhaka (CISD)	Senior Section: House-60/A, Road-27 (old), 16 (new), Junior Section: House: 2/9, Block- D, Lalmatia, Dhaka-1207	The pre-school curriculum of IPC (USA), a Primary curriculum of IPC (UK) and CIPP, CGE O and A Level curricula of Cambridge	Playgroup to A Level	
Changes (An English Medium School)	208 B.B Road, Chashara, Narayanganj		Playgroup to A Level	
Cherry Blossoms Int'l School and College	Section - 6, Block - A, Road - 4, House -7, Dhaka 1216	Edexcel Curriculum	Playgroup to A level	Dec-Jan, May–June
Cordova Int'l School & College	House-29, Road-4, Block–C, Banasree, Rampura	Edexcel curriculum	Playgroup to A Level	October; April
Daffodil International School	Permanent Campus: House-11, Road-14, Dhanmondi, Dhaka-1209 Uttara Branch: House-3, Shonargaon Janapath, Sector-12, Uttara Model Town, Uttara, Dhaka-1230	Edexcel curriculum and Cambridge Curriculum both	Playgroup to A Level	
Darland International School	House-5, Road-11/2, Block-B, Section-10, Mirpur, Dhaka-1216	Edexcel curriculum	Playgroup to A Level	
Dhanmondi Tutorial	House-8, Road-14, Dhanmondi, Dhaka-1205	Edexcel curriculum	Playgroup to A Level	
Don Bosco School & College	House-22, Road-13, Sector-4, Uttara, Dhaka-1230	Edexcel curriculum	Playgroup to A Level	
DPS STS School Dhaka	Junior section: Plot-4, Road-13, Sector-6, Uttara Model Town, Dhaka-1230 Senior section: Plot-ED-01, Road-1, Sector-15, Uttara Model Town, Dhaka-1230	Cambridge curriculum	Playgroup to Grade 12	
East-West International School & College	265/1, West Shewrapara, Mirpur, Dhaka-1216	Edexcel curriculum	Playgroup to A Level	
Ebenezer International School	Plot 288/A, Block-C, Bashundhara R/A, Dhaka-1229	Edexcel curriculum	Pre-kindergarten to Grade 12	
Empyrean International School	House 18, Road 2, Block B, Section 6, Mirpur, Dhaka-1216	Edexcel curriculum	PG to IAL	June to July
European Standard School	Campus-I: House-66, Road-7/A, Dhanmondi R/A, Dhaka-1209 Campus-II: House-31/A, Road-8, Dhanmondi, Dhaka-1205 Campus-III: House-59/B, Road-12/A, Dhanmondi R/A, Dhaka-1209 Campus-IV: House-72, Road-12/A, Dhanmondi R/A, Dhaka-1209 Wari Campus: House-31/D, Rankin Street, Wari, Dhaka-1203 Mirpur Campus: House No-15 C/A, Block-F, Avenue-1, Section-2, Mirpur, Dhaka-1216	Cambridge curriculum	Playgroup to A Level	
GPH International School	Swimming Pool Road (Circuit House), Munshiganj Sadar, Munshiganj, Dhaka-1500	Edexcel curriculum	Playgroup to A Level	
Green Dale International School, Dhaka	Senior Campus: House-8, Road-83 Junior Campus 1: House#, Gulshan North Avenue; Junior Campus 2: House-3, Road-84, Gulshan-2, Dhaka-1212	Cambridge curriculum	Playgroup to A Level	
Green Gems International School	House-33/A, Road-9/A, Dhanmondi R/A, Dhaka-1209	Edexcel curriculum	Playgroup to O Level	
Guidance International School	House 6, Road 24, Gulshan 1, Dhaka 1212	Cambridge Curriculum	Playgroup to A Level	
HURDCO International School	Bashundhara Main Gate, Bashundhara Road, Dhaka-1229	Cambridge curriculum	Playgroup to 12th grade	
International Bangladesh Hope School	Main Branch: Plot-7, Road-6, Sector-4 Uttara, Dhaka-1230	Cambridge curriculum	Playgroup to A Level	
Islamic International School & College	House 18, Road 9, Gulshan 1, Dhaka.	Edexcel curriculum	Playgroup to A Level	
Islami Bank International School & College	225 Senpara Parbata, Mirpur, Dhaka-1216	Edexcel curriculum	Playgroup to O Level	
Junior Laboratory High School	House No: 38, Road No: 10/A, Dhanmondi, Dhaka-1209		Nursery to O Level	
Kids Tutorial	7/A Circuit House Rd, Ramna, Shantinagar, Dhaka- 1000	Singapore curriculum	Playgroup to Class 8	
Lakehead Grammar School	Gulshan Branch: House-SEB-6, Road-134, Gulshan-1, Dhaka-1212 Dhanmondi Branch: House-78, Road-11/A, Dhaka-1209	Edexcel curriculum	Playgroup to A Level	
London Grace International School	Main campus: 10/12 Iqbal Road, Mohammadpur, Dhaka Campus-2: House-9, Road-8, Shehertek, Mohammadpur, Dhaka	Cambridge curriculum	Playgroup to A Level	
Lords	Main Branch: Gulshan 1,Road 116 Dhaka.	Edexcel curriculum	Playgroup to A Level	
Manarat Dhaka International School and College	House-106 Rd-104, Gulshan, Dhaka-1212	Cambridge curriculum	Playgroup to A Level	
Mangrove School	7/8, Block-D, Lalmatia, Dhaka-1207	Edexcel curriculum	Playgroup to A Level	
Maple Leaf International School	House-31, Road-14A, Dhanmondi R/A Dhaka-1209	Edexcel: GCSE	Playgroup to A Level	
Marie Curie School	House-28, Road-04, Dhanmondi R/A Dhaka-1205	Edexcel: GCSE	Playgroup to O Level	
Mastermind School	Main campus: House-5, Road-12, Dhanmondi R/A, Dhaka-1209	Both Edexcel and Cambridge curriculum	Playgroup to A Level	
Methodist English Medium School	250/1, 2nd Colony Mazar Road, Mirpur-1, Dhaka-1216	Edexcel curriculum	Playgroup to A Level	
Mirpur International Tutorial	House-16, Sec-2, Block-D, Ave-2, Mirpur, Dhaka-1216	Edexcel curriculum	Playgroup to A Level	
North South International School & College	House #742 West Shewrapara, Begum Rokeya Sharani, Mirpur, Dhaka-1216	Edexcel curriculum	Pre-Play to A Level	
The New School Dhaka	House-39, Road-1, Banani, Dhaka-1213	Edexcel curriculum	Playgroup to A Level	
Orchid International School	House 5, Road No 2, Section No 2, Dhaka 1216	Cambridge curriculum	Playgroup to A Level	
Park International School and College	House-386, Block-B, Chowdhury Para (Near Vooter Adda Restaurant), Khilgaon, Dhaka-1219	Cambridge curriculum	Playgroup to A Level	
Playpen	House - 545/A, Block – J, Road - 19 Bashundhara R/A, Dhaka – 1229	Cambridge curriculum	Playgroup to Grade 12	
Pledge Harbour International School	Singer Dighi, Maona, Sreepur, Gazipur-1741	IB curriculum	Playgroup to diploma	
Premier School Dhaka	House-29, Gareeb-E-Newaz Road, Uttara, Dhaka-1230	Edexcel curriculum	Playgroup to O Level	
Prime Bank English Medium School	Uttara branch: House-11, Road-20/C, Sector-4, Uttara, Dhaka-1230 Mirpur Branch: House-05, Avenue 2, Block-A, Section-11, Mirpur, Dhaka-1216		Playgroup to A Level	
SchoolEdge	H-42, R-13, Sector-3, Uttara, Dhaka-1230	Cambridge curriculum	Playgroup to A Level	June–July
S. F. X. Greenherald International Schools	24 Asad Avenue, Mohammadpur, Dhaka-1207	Cambridge curriculum	Kindergarten 1 to A Level	
St. Peters School of London	Dhanmondi Branch: Road-7A, House-74/A, Dhanmondi, Dhaka-1209 Uttara Branch: House-22, Sector-13 (opposite of Agora)	Edexcel curriculum	Playgroup to A Level	
Scholastica	Uttara, Mirpur, Gulshan & Dhanmondi	Cambridge curriculum	Playgroup to A Level	
School of the Nation (SON)	House-8, Road-3, Block-F, Banasree, Rampura, Dhaka-1219	Cambridge curriculum (CAIE)	Pre-Play to A Level	
Seabreeze International School	House-02, Road-128, Gulshan-1, Dhaka-1212	Edexcel curriculum	Playgroup to A Level	
Singapore International School	House-34, Road-26, Sector-7, Uttara, Dhaka-1230	Edexcel curriculum	Playgroup to A Level	
Sir John Wilson School	Main Campus (KGII to A Level): United City, Satarkul, Dhaka-1229 Early Section (PG-KGI): House-5, Road-77, Gulshan, Dhaka-1212	Edexcel curriculum	Playgroup to A Level	September
South Breeze School	Dhanmondi Main Campus: House-23, Road-10A, Dhanmondi, Dhaka-1209 Dhanmondi Infant Section 2: House-74, Road-7A, Dhanmondi, Dhaka-1209 Uttara Campus: House-51, Road-2 Sector-11, Uttara, Dhaka-1230	Edexcel curriculum	Playgroup to 11th grade	June
South Point School & College	House-2, Road-2, Banani, Dhaka-1213	Cambridge curriculum	Playgroup to O Level	
Stride International School	House-34, Road-26, Sector 7, Uttara, Dhaka	Edexcel	Playgroup to A Level	
Sunbeams School	Uttara campus: Road-12/B, Uttara, Dhaka-1230	Edexcel	Playgroup to A Level	
Sunnydale School	Senior section-1: House-34, Road-7, Dhanmondi R/A, Dhaka-1209 Senior section-2: Lalmatia, Dhaka Middle section: House-66, Road-11/A, Dhanmondi R/A, Dhaka-1209 Junior section-1: House-102, Road-9/A, Dhanmondi R/A, Dhaka-1209 Junior section-2: 5/2 Gaznavi Road, Block-B, Mohammadpur, Dhaka-1225 Early Learning I & Senior : Plot # 19A, Road # 13, Block G, Bashundhara, Dhaka-1229	Cambridge curriculum	Playgroup to A Level	
Sydney International School	House-08, Road-09, Block-J, Baridhara, Dhaka-1212	Board of Studies, Teaching and Educational Standards (BOSTES) and Cambridge curriculum for O Level	Preschool to O Level	
Tiny Tots and Summerfield International School	7/1 Axis Delvista, Aurangazeb Road, Mohammadpur, Dhaka-1207	Cambridge and Edexcel	Preschool to A Level	
Vision Global School	House-17, Road-10, Gulshan-1, Dhaka-1212	Edexcel curriculum	Playgroup to A Level	
Wheaton International School	House 2/4, Block C, Lalmatia, Dhaka-1207	CAIE	Playgroup to A Level	June and December
Willes Little Flower School & College	85, Kakrail Rd, Dhaka-1000	Edexcel curriculum for English medium students	Playgroup to A Level	
William Carey International School	70-D/1, Indira Road, Sher-E-Bangla Nagar, Dhaka	Cambridge curriculum	Playgroup to O Level	
Yale International School	House-41, Road-04, Sector-03, Uttara Model Town, Dhaka-1230	Cambridge and Edexcel curriculum	Playgroup to A Level	
Sunnyside School	House-43, Road-04, Sector-03, Uttara Model Town, Dhaka-1230	Cambridge and Edexcel curriculum	Playgroup to A Level	December–January and June–July
Singapore School Kinderland	House-32, Road-123, Gulshan-1, Dhaka-1212	Cambridge (primary and secondary level) and Singapore (preschool level) curriculum	Playgroup to A Level	December–January and June–July
Apple Tree National University	Plot C-11-13/1 Road 1/1, Block Ka & Kha, Dhaka 1216	National Curriculum and Textbook Board	Playgroup-Nursery	January–February

== Other divisions ==
Name	Location	Curriculum	Est.	Levels	Admission Period
Blue Bell English Medium School	Boalia, Rajshahi	Edexcel		Playgroup to A Level	December–January and June–July
Saint Mathews International English Medium School	Dinajpur, Rangpur		2005	Playgroup to Class Five	
STEMAYS SCHOOL	Sylhet	Edexcel	2018	Pre Kindergarten to A Level	Dec-Jan & Jun-Jul

== See also ==
- Education in Bangladesh
- International Schools in Chittagong
- English version schools (Bangladesh)
- List of schools in Bangladesh
- List of zilla schools of Bangladesh
- List of Qawmi Madrasas in Bangladesh
- List of colleges in Bangladesh
- List of institutes in Bangladesh
- List of cadet colleges in Bangladesh
- List of medical colleges in Bangladesh
- List of dental schools in Bangladesh
- Textile schools in Bangladesh
- List of architecture schools in Bangladesh
- List of universities in Bangladesh
