= Education in Bangladesh =

Ministry of Education Ministry of Primary and Mass Education
- Minister for Education State Minister for Primary and Mass Education: A. N. M. Ehsanul Hoque Milan Bobby Hajjaj

National education budget (2025)
- Budget: US$ 7.79 Billion billion (95,645 crore Taka)

General details
- Primary languages: Bengali • English • Arabic (in madrassas)
- System type: National
- Established compulsory education: 4 November 1972 (de jure)

Literacy (2025)
- Total: 77.9%
- Male: 80.1%
- Female: 75.8%

Enrollment
- Total: 23,907,151 (2019)
- Primary: 16,230,000
- Secondary: 7,400,000
- Post secondary: 277,151

Attainment
- Secondary diploma: 335,454
- Post-secondary diploma: 86,948
- "Bangladesh Education Stats". NationMaster. "Statistical Pocket Book-2006" (PDF). Bangladesh Bureau of Statistics. 2006. Archived from the original (PDF) on 28 September 2007. "Bangladesh". The World Factbook. CIA. 2016. Archived from the original on 10 January 2021. https://data.unicef.org/wp-content/uploads/2021/05/Bangladesh-Education-Fact-Sheets_V7.pdf

Education in Bangladesh is administered generally by the country's Ministry of Education. The Ministry of Primary and Mass Education implements policies for primary education and state-funded schools at a local level. Constitutionally, education in Bangladesh is compulsory for all citizens until the end of grade eight. Primary and secondary education are partially funded by the state, and free of charge in public institutions.

Bangladesh conforms fully to the UN's Education For All (EFA) objectives and the Millennium Development Goals (MDG) as well as other education-related international declarations. Now, the government of Bangladesh tends to align the curriculum that meets the "Goal: SDG-4" that is the "Quality Education" characterized in the charter of "Sustainable Development Goal 4". Article 17 of the Bangladesh Constitution provides that all children shall receive free and compulsory education.

The Human Rights Measurement Initiative (HRMI) finds that Bangladesh is fulfilling only 67.4% of what it should be fulfilling for the right to education based on the country's level of income. HRMI breaks down the right to education by looking at the rights to both primary education and secondary education. While taking into consideration Bangladesh's income level, the nation is achieving 99.2% of what should be possible based on its resources (income) for primary education but only 63.7% for secondary education. Over the course of the past five decades, Bangladesh has achieved commendable advancements in the domain of education. As education stands as an indispensable human right, dedicated efforts are being exerted to guarantee its accessibility for every individual. Looking ahead to the next decade, it is conceivable that Bangladesh will attain a full literacy rate of 100 percent.

A noteworthy facet in Bangladesh is the near-universal enrollment of children in schools, evident through a primary school net enrollment rate of 98%. Additionally, an increasing number of female students are enrolling in school, subsequently entering the workforce and making substantial contributions to the expansion of various economic sectors. The government in recent years has made notable efforts at improving women's educational condition in the country.

== Education system ==
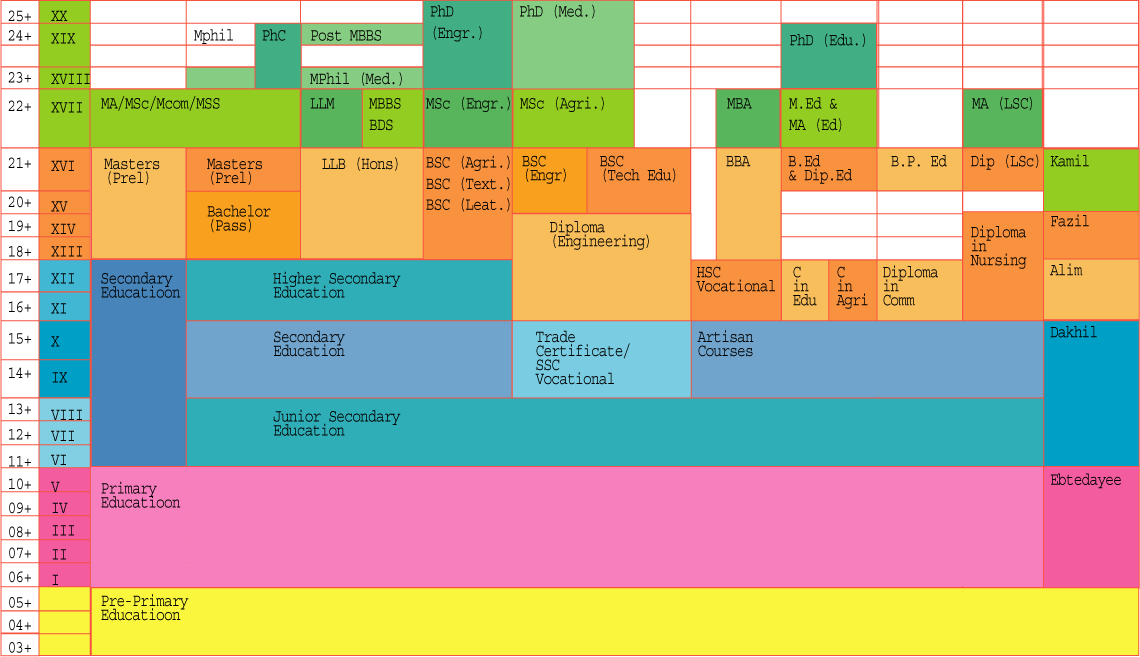
Structure of Bangladesh's public education system

The mainstream education system is divided into three levels according to DSHE:

- Primary level (Classes 1–8)
- Secondary level (Classes 9–12)
- Tertiary level

Another level Pre-primary level (Classes K-2) is also present. There is no recognized middle school system though classes 6-8 are considered to be.

At all levels of schooling, students can choose to receive their education either in English or Bengali.

Bangladesh has allocated 60 percent of primary school teaching positions specifically for women.

=== National curriculum ===
The National Curriculum and Textbook Board (NCTB) provides textbooks, takes standardized tests via one of two languages: English and Bengali. Bengali and English are mandatory subjects for all students following the national curriculum irrespective of their chosen medium of instruction. The Bengali version of the national curriculum is called "Bangla version" and the English version of the national curriculum is called "English version". Those who follow these individual curriculums are called "Bangla version students" and "English version students" respectively. Bangla version of alternate curriculums are called "Bangla Medium" and English version of alternate curriculums are called "English medium". Those who follow these individual alternate curriculums are called "Bangla medium students" and "English medium students" respectively.

A student is expected to complete 12 years of education up to class 12.

There is no choice of subjects offered to students under this curriculum until class 9 and again at class 11 when a student has to choose between 3 streams of education. The 3 streams of education are as following:

- Arts and Humanities
- Commerce
- Science

In class 9–10 and 11–12, each has its own pre-selected set of subjects with one optional subject which can be changed. For instance, a student studying in science group can't replace chemistry, Bangla or religion for accounting or history. In other words, a student of this curriculum has to study a pre-set group of subjects with having only one choice of replacing an elective subject to another elective subject. Science is the most sought-after stream of education in urban areas.

Standardized exams were held in class 5 and class 8 called Primary Education Completion Certificate and Junior School Certificate (JSC) respectively. These exams are now defunct; with the last exam of PECE being held in 2019, and the last exam of JSC being held in November 2019 However, national scholarships- the Primary Scholarship Exam in class 5 and the Junior Scholarship Exam in class 8 are held instead since academic year 2025. The Primary Scholarship Exam was experimentally revived in 2022, but scrapped temporarily to push the 2022 national curriculum until 2025 when it was re-introduced fully.

100% of the mark obtained in certificates of SSC (class 10) and HSC (class 12) examinations is obtained from standardized written tests, multiple choice questions, practical part, and viva-voice involved with practical part. Classroom performance, homework and assignments play no part in a student's certificate. Standardized written tests (Creative part) and multiple-choice questions (MCQ) are taken in a single sitting without breaks. A student is given a blank answer script separate from the question paper to answer the creative part, and a separate Optical Mark Reader (OMR) sheet to mark answers to Multiple Choice Questions. Time allocation for MCQ and CQ (Creative Questions) parts are separate and strictly enforced, OMR sheet is taken away after the allocated time, and CQ question is provided. Practical part is taken in another sitting on a separate day, viva-voice is taken during practical exam simultaneously.

=== Schools ===
There are schools in Bangladesh that educates people of different backgrounds. This include International Schools with English or French as a medium of instruction, religiously affiliated schools, and schools teaching the national curriculum using Bengali or English as a medium of instruction. French International School of Dhaka (Ecole Française Internationale de Dacca) is a bilingual international school that offers 60% of its courses in French. The Aga Khan Academy, Dhaka is an international school by Aga Khan Development Network which is an English only school with Bangla and French courses. Cadet Colleges are important schools in the education system of Bangladesh which follows the national curriculum. A cadet college is a room and board collegiate administered by the Bangladesh Military. Discipline is compulsory at all cadet colleges. Faujdarhat Cadet College is the first cadet college in Bangladesh, established in 1958 over an area of 185 acres (0.75 km^{2}) at Faujdarhat in the district of Chittagong. At present, there are 12 cadet colleges in Bangladesh, including three for girls. Four Cadet Colleges were established before 1971. Other cadet colleges were built after the Liberation War of Bangladesh.

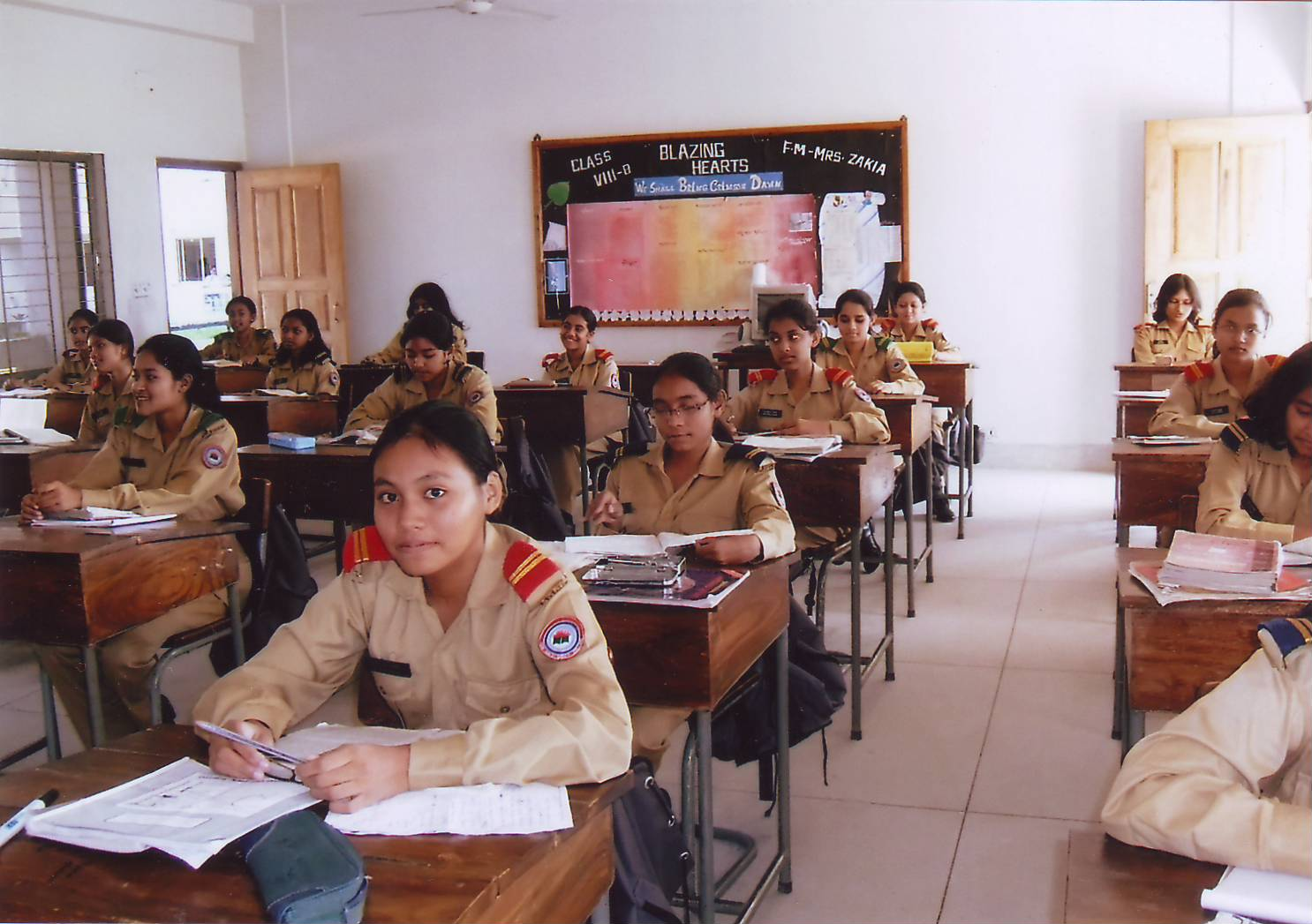
Cadets in a classroom

Government of Bangladesh plans to build 1,000 primary schools in char areas.

As of September 2019, tertiary education in Bangladesh takes place at 44 government, 101 private and 3 international universities. Students can choose to further their studies in chartered accountancy, engineering, technology, agriculture and medicine at a variety of universities and colleges.

{An updated data chart January 2020 on the Primary Education can be retrieved from the following link}

Numbers of Primary Education Institutions, Teachers and Students, 2018
School type	No. of schools	Total teachers			Total students		
School type	No. of schools	Total	Female	% female	Total	Girls	% girls
Govt. Primary Schools	38,033	222652	144434	64.9	10188129	5252022	51.6
New Nationalized PS	25,008	96460	47396	49.1	4483785	2278239	50.8
Total government schools	63,041	319112	191830	60.11	14671914	7530261	51.32
Regd. NGPS	193	771	464	60.2	38282	19611	51.2
Non-regd. NGPS	1,744	6649	4716	70.9	256268	127112	49.6
Schools for Autistic Children	33	282	246	89.2	10652	5250	49.3
Ebtadaee Madrasahs	2,673	11673	2300	19.7	372277	181341	48.7
Kindergartens	16,170	93799	54813	58.4	1988365	914016	46.0
NGO Schools	2,512	5454	3764	69.0	210170	107898	51.3
Community Schools	120	405	322	79.5	16747	8679	51.8
Attached to High Madrasahs	5,526	19764	2812	14.2	871047	427341	49.1
Primary Sections of High Schools	1,511	8301	4450	53.6	572751	295659	51.6
BRAC	7,779	7798	7277	93.3	324438	185873	57.3
ROSC School	3,818	3591	2867	79.8	106884	53751	50.3
Sishu Kollyan Primary School	133	410	277	67.6	15665	8284	52.9
Other Schools	3,262	4875	2967	60.9	97519	48808	50.0
Total	108,515	482884	279105	57.8	19552979	9913884	50.7

Non-English medium schools	108515
English medium schools	196

Age	Grade	Educational Board												Qawmi Education Board	Alia Education Board
3+	PG	Pre-Primary Education												Tahfeez ul Quran	
4+	Nursery	Pre-Primary Education												Tahfeez ul Quran	
5+	KG	Pre-Primary Education												Tahfeez ul Quran	
6+	I	Primary Education												Ibtedayi	Ebtedayee
7+	II	Primary Education												Ibtedayi	Ebtedayee
8+	III	Primary Education												Ibtedayi	Ebtedayee
9+	IV	Primary Education												Ibtedayi	Ebtedayee
10+	V	Primary Education												Ibtedayi	Ebtedayee
11+	VI	Secondary Education	Junior Secondary Education											Mutawassitah	Dakhil
12+	VII	Secondary Education	Junior Secondary Education											Mutawassitah	Dakhil
13+	VIII	Secondary Education	Junior Secondary Education											Mutawassitah	Dakhil
14+	IX	Secondary Education	Secondary Education				SSC (Vocational)		Artisan Course					Sanaria ammah	Dakhil
15+	X	Secondary Education	Secondary Education				SSC (Vocational)		Artisan Course					Sanaria ammah	Dakhil
16+	XI	Secondary Education	Higher Secondary Education				Diploma (Engg.)		HSC (BMT)	C in Edu	C in Agri	Diploma in Comm	Diploma in Nursing		Alim
17+	XII	Secondary Education	Higher Secondary Education				Diploma (Engg.)		HSC (BMT)	C in Edu	C in Agri	Diploma in Comm	Diploma in Nursing		Alim
18+	XIII	Masters (Prel)	Bachelor (Pass)	LLB (Hons)		BSc(Hons)	Diploma (Engg.)		BBA				Diploma in Nursing	Fazilat	Fazil
19+	XIV	Masters (Prel)	Bachelor (Pass)	LLB (Hons)		BSc(Hons)	Diploma (Engg.)		BBA				Diploma in Nursing	Fazilat	Fazil
20+	XV	Masters (Prel)	Bachelor (Pass)	LLB (Hons)		BSc(Hons)	BSc (Engg.)	(BEngg.)	BBA					Takmil	Kamil
21+	XVI	Masters (Prel)	Masters (Prel)	LLB (Hons)		BSc(Hons)	BSc (Engg.)	(BEngg.)	BBA	BEd & Dip.Ed		B.P. Ed	Dip (Lsc)	Takmil	Kamil
22+	XVII	MA/MSc/Mcom/MSS		LLM	MBBS BDS	MSc	BSc (Engg.)	(BEngg.)	MBA	MEd & MA			MA (Lsc)		
23+	XVIII		PhD	MPhil (Med.)		PhD	MSc (Engg.)			PhD (Edu.)					
24+	XIX	Mphil	PhD	Post MBBS		PhD	PhD (Engg.)			PhD (Edu.)					
25+	XX		PhD			PhD	PhD (Engg.)								
26+	XIX						PhD (Engg.)								

=== Primary education ===
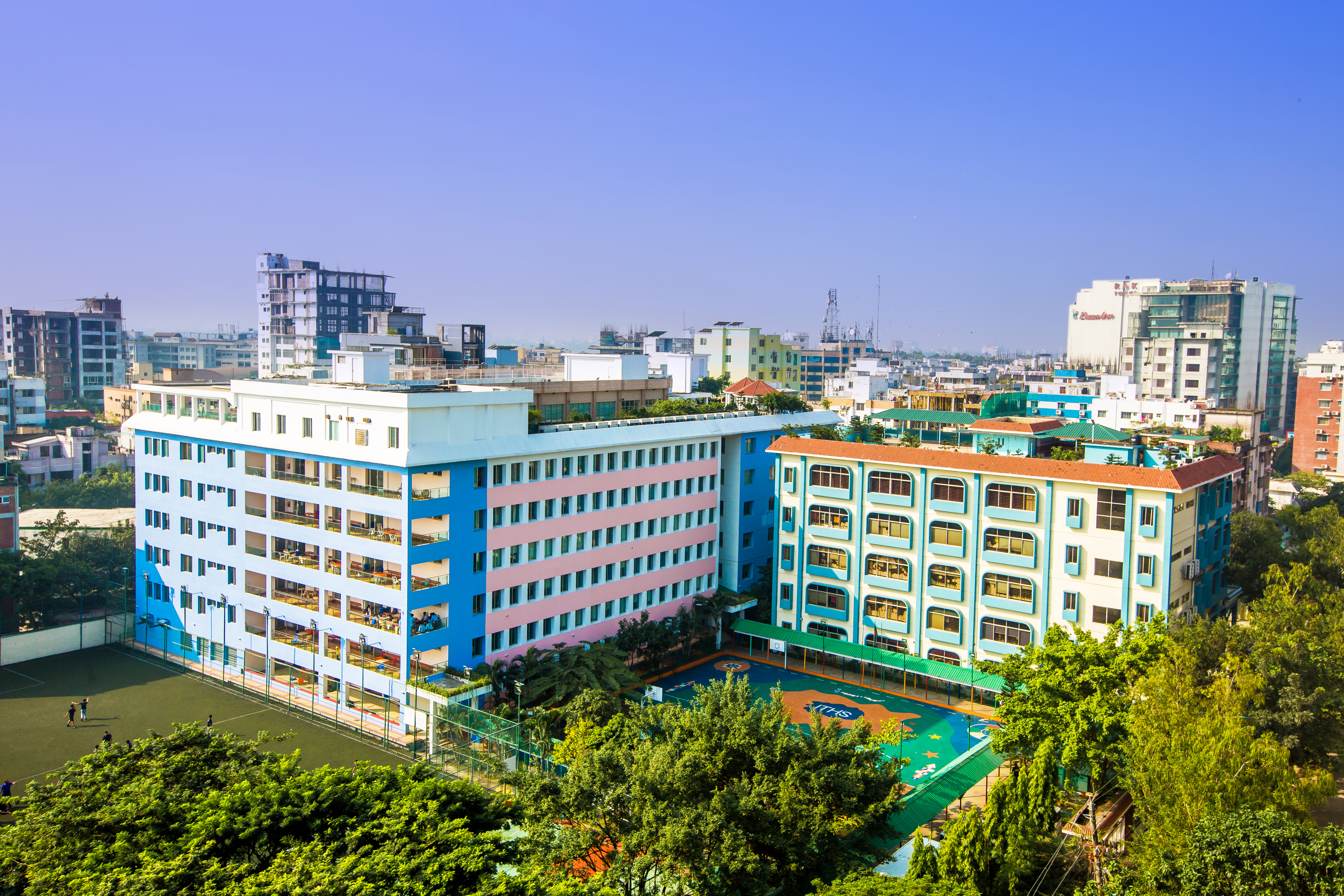
A typical Bangladeshi primary school

The overall responsibility of management of primary education lies with the Ministry of Primary and Mass Education (MOPME), set up as a Ministry in 1992. While MOPME is involved in formulation of policies, the responsibility of implementation rests with the Directorate of Primary Education (DPE) headed by a Director General. The Directorate of Primary Education (DPE) and its subordinate offices in the district and Upazila are solely responsible for management and supervision of primary education. Their responsibilities include recruitment, posting, and transfer of teachers and other staff; arranging in-service training of teachers; distribution of free textbooks; and supervision of schools. The responsibility of school construction, repair and supply of school furniture lies with the DPE executed through the Local Government Engineering Department (LGED). The National Curriculum and Textbook Board (NCTB) is responsible for the development of curriculum and production of textbooks. According to the National Curriculum and Textbook Board, this year (2022), 34,70,16,277 textbooks have been distributed among 4,17,26,856 pre-primary, primary, secondary, Ebtedayee, Dakhil, vocational, SSC vocational, ethnic minority groups and visually challenged students across the country. Of the total textbooks, 24,71,63,256 are for secondary and 9,98,53,021 for primary level students.

While the Ministry of Education (MOE) is responsible for formulation of policies, the Directorate of Secondary and Higher Education (DSHE) under the Ministry of Education is responsible for implementing the same at secondary and higher education levels. The NCTB is responsible for developing curriculum and publishing standard textbooks.

The Directorate of Primary Education (DPE) are responsible for conducting the two public examinations:

- Primary Education Certificate (PEC) (5th grade)
- Junior School Certificate (JSC) (8th grade)

The recent update on the PEC and JSC examinations are that "There will be no Primary Education Completion (PEC) and Junior School Certificate (JSC) examinations from 2023", disclosed Education Minister Dipu Moni at a Secretariat Press Conference in September 2021.

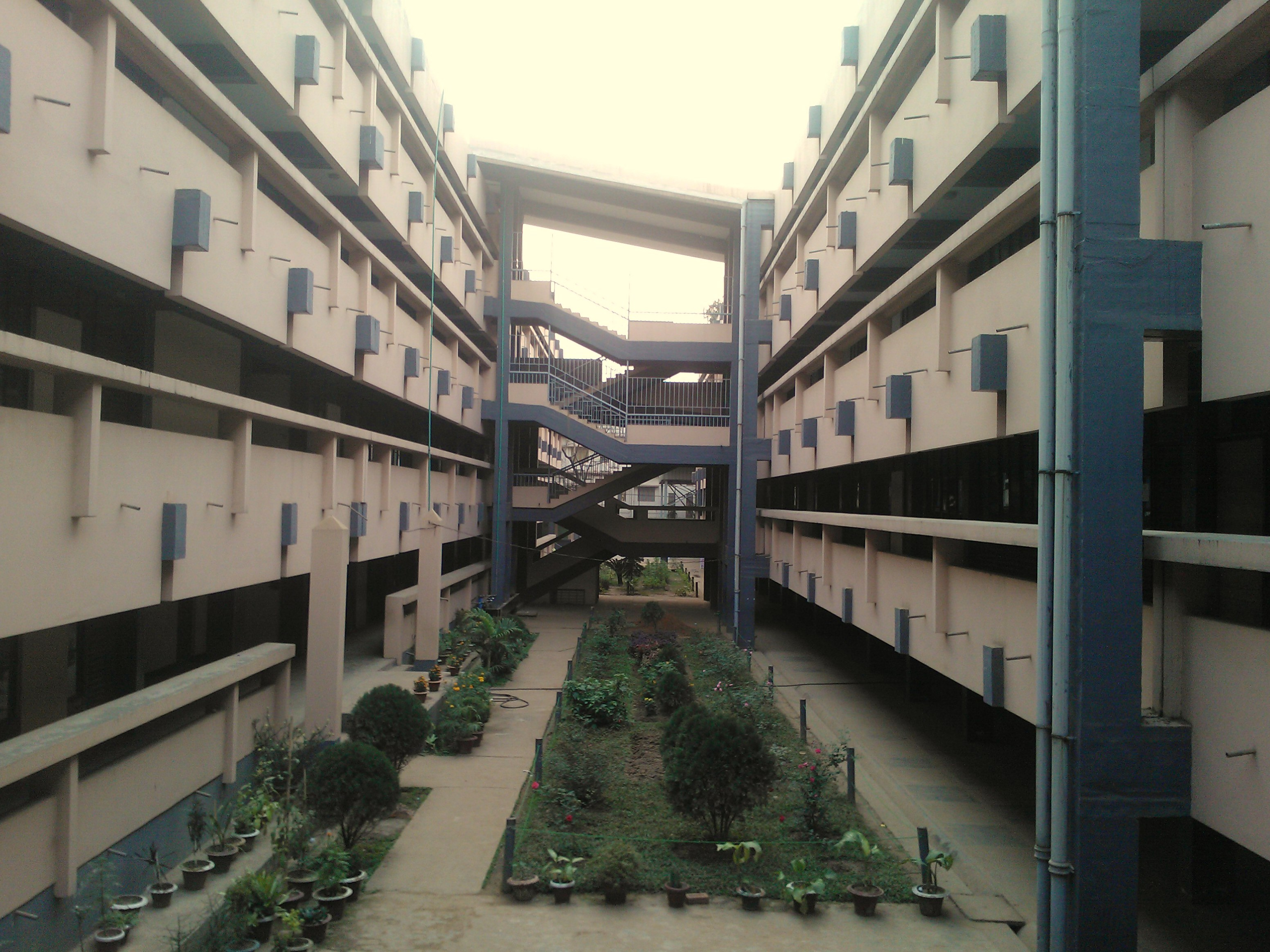
St Joseph Higher Secondary School, Dhaka, one of the most prestigious Educational Institutions in Bangladesh providing both secondary and higher secondary education.

=== Secondary education ===
The secondary level of education is controlled by the ten general education boards:

1. Bangladesh Madrasah Education Board for Alia Madrasah
2. Board of Intermediate and Secondary Education, Barishal for Barisal Division
3. Board of Intermediate and Secondary Education, Chittagong for Chittagong Region of Chittagong Division
4. Board of Intermediate and Secondary Education, Comilla for Cumilla region of Chittagong Division
5. Board of Intermediate and Secondary Education, Dhaka for Dhaka Division
6. Board of Intermediate and Secondary Education, Dinajpur for Rangpur Division
7. Board of Intermediate and Secondary Education, Jessore for Khulna Division
8. Board of Intermediate and Secondary Education, Mymensingh for Mymensingh Division
9. Board of Intermediate and Secondary Education, Rajshahi for Rajshahi Division
10. Board of Intermediate and Secondary Education, Sylhet for Sylhet Division

The boards' headquarters are located in Barisal, Comilla, Chittagong, Dhaka, Dinajpur, Jessore, Mymensingh, Rajshahi and Sylhet.

Nine region-based Boards of Intermediate and Secondary Education (BISE) are responsible for conducting the two public examinations:

- Secondary School Certificate (SSC) (10th grade)
- Higher Secondary School Certificate (HSC) (12th grade)

At the school level, in the case of non-government secondary schools, School Management Committees (SMC), and at the intermediate college level, in the case of non-government colleges, Governing Bodies (GB), formed as per government directives, are responsible for mobilizing resources, approving budgets, controlling expenditures, and appointing and disciplining staff. While teachers at non-government secondary schools are recruited by concerned SMCs observing relevant government rules, teachers at government secondary schools are recruited centrally by the DSHE through a competitive examination.

In government secondary schools, there is not an SMC. The headmaster is solely responsible for running the school and is supervised by the deputy director of the respective zone. Parent Teachers Associations (PTAs), however, exist to ensure a better teaching and learning environment.

=== Tertiary education ===
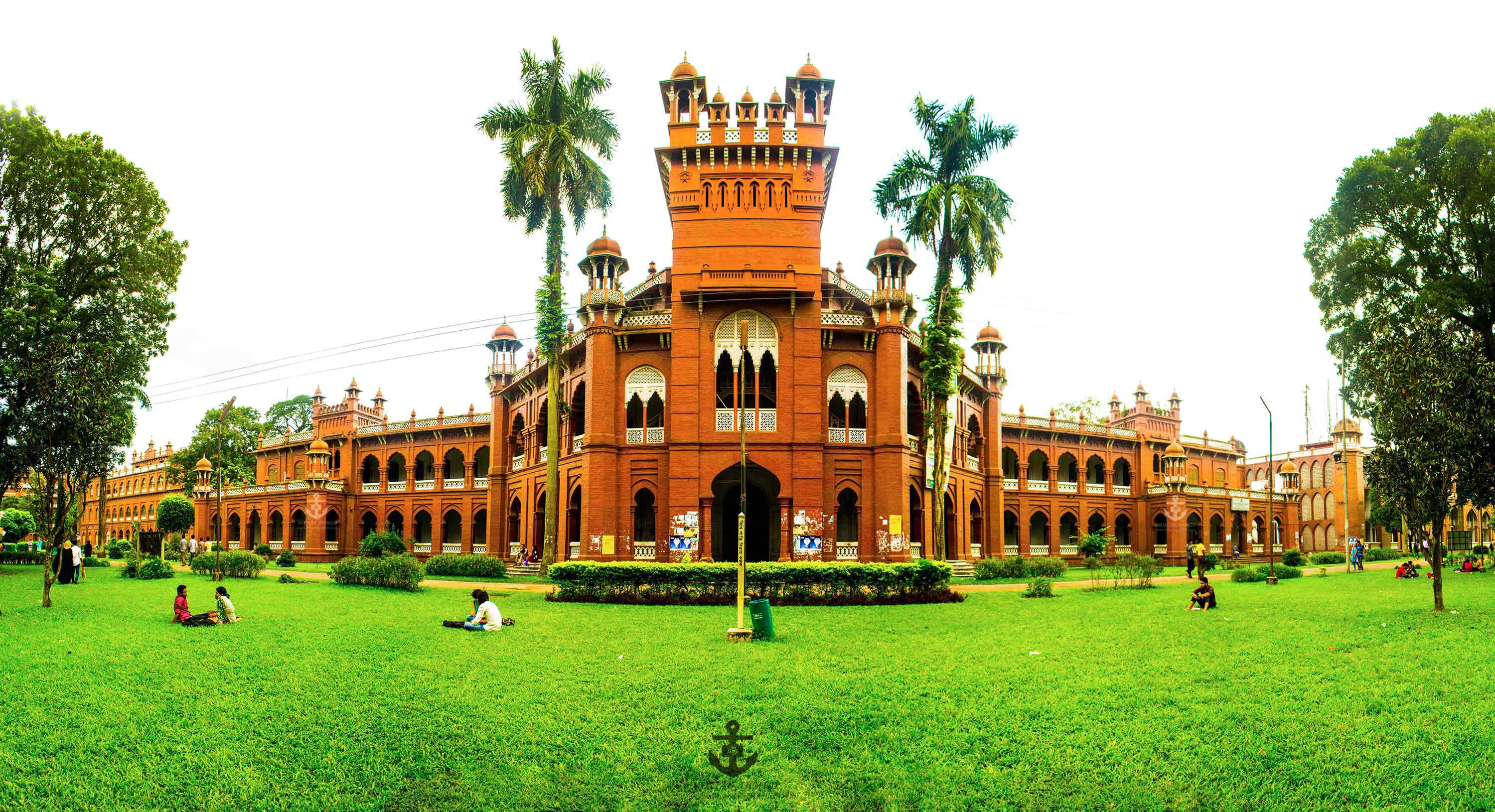
Curzon Hall, University of Dhaka

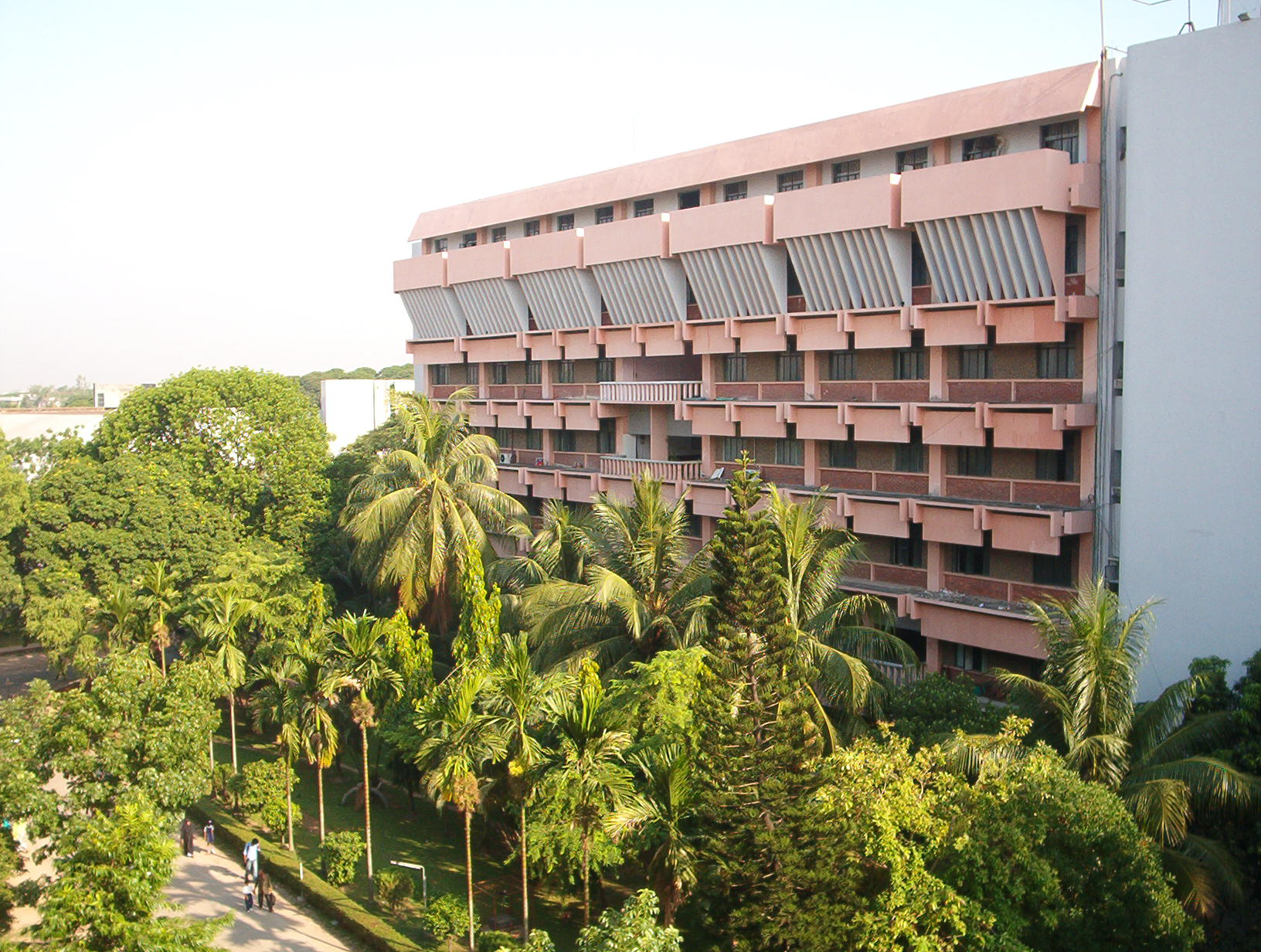
Civil Engineering Building of BUET

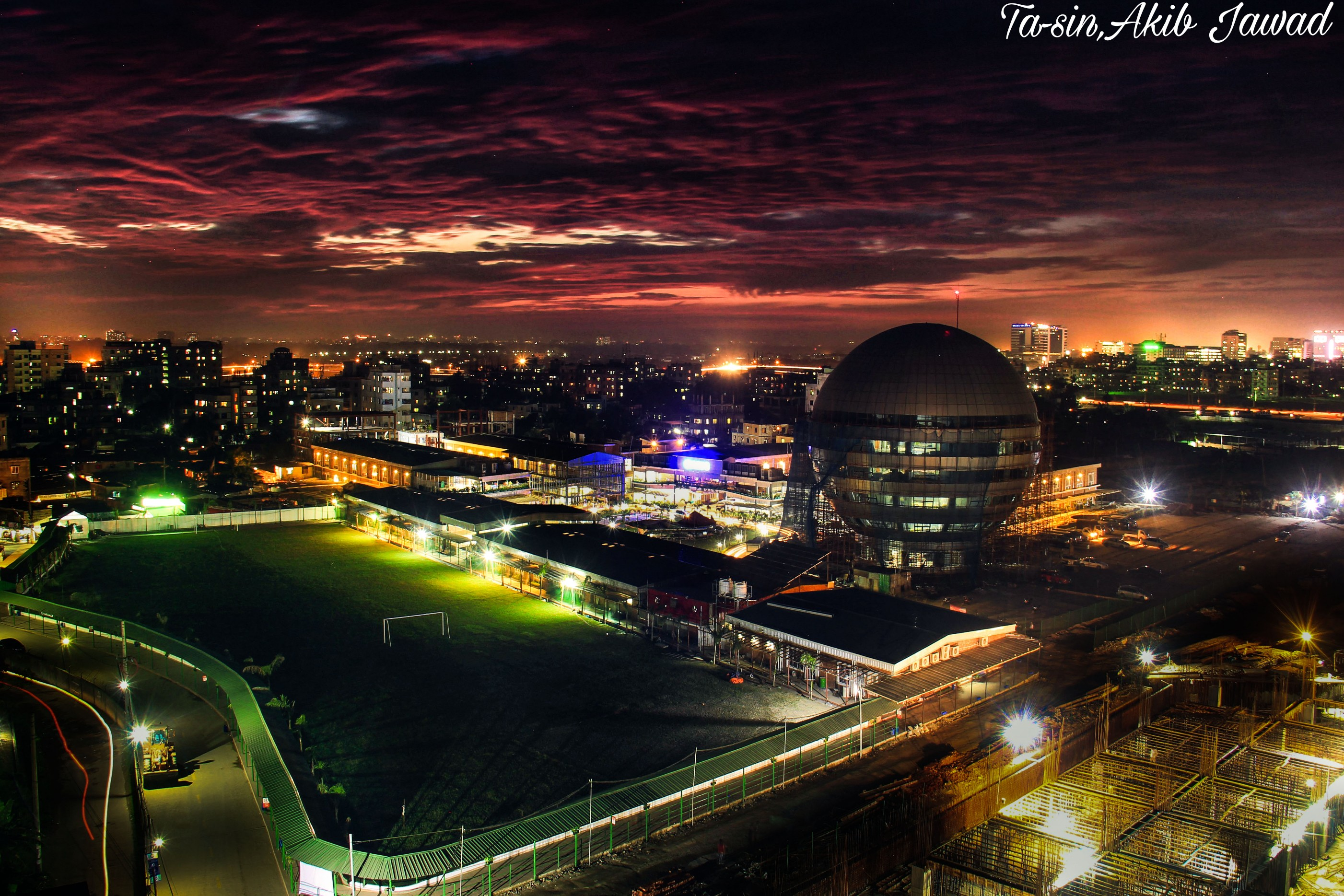
Night View, American International University Bangladesh (Private University), Dhaka

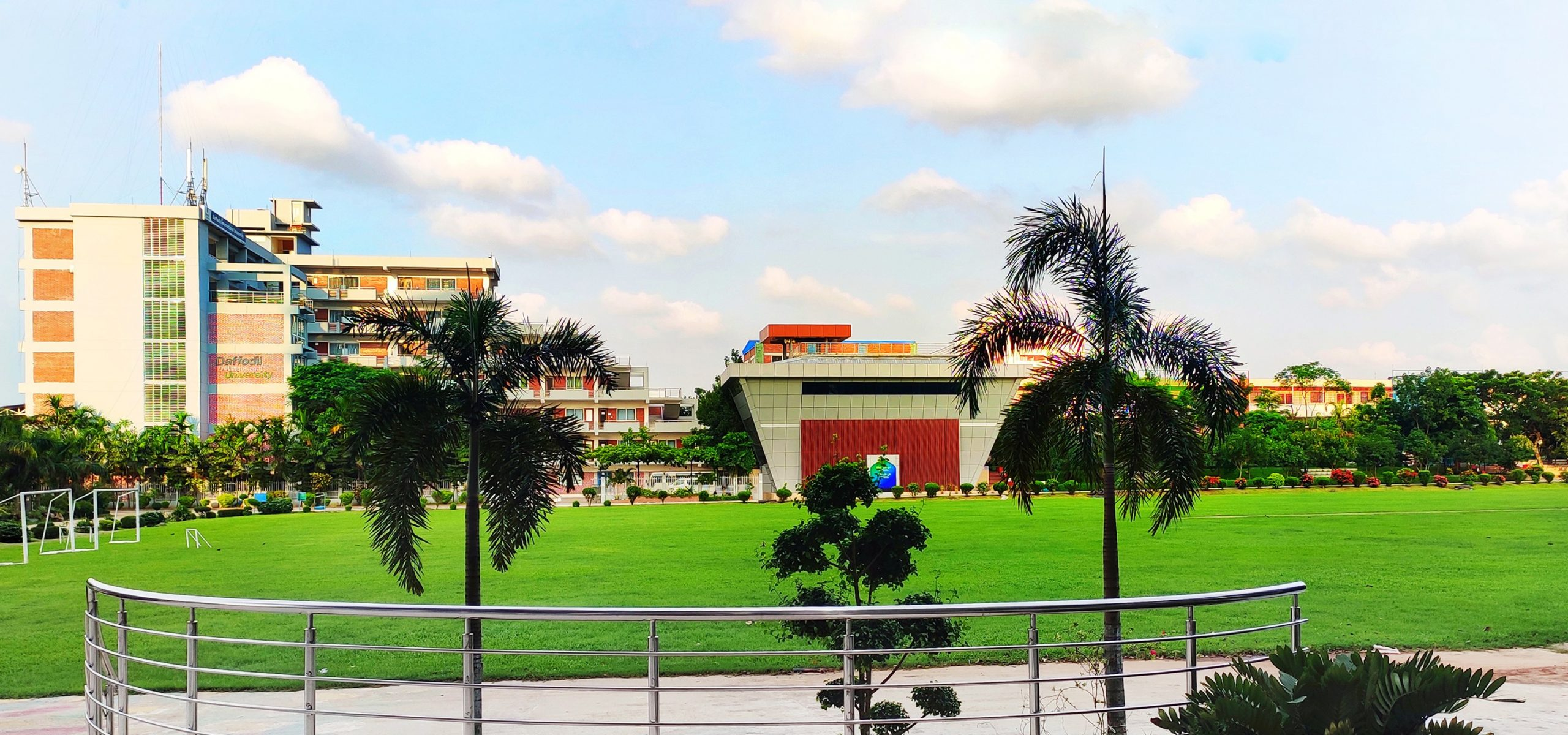
Campus of Daffodil International University (Private University), Dhaka

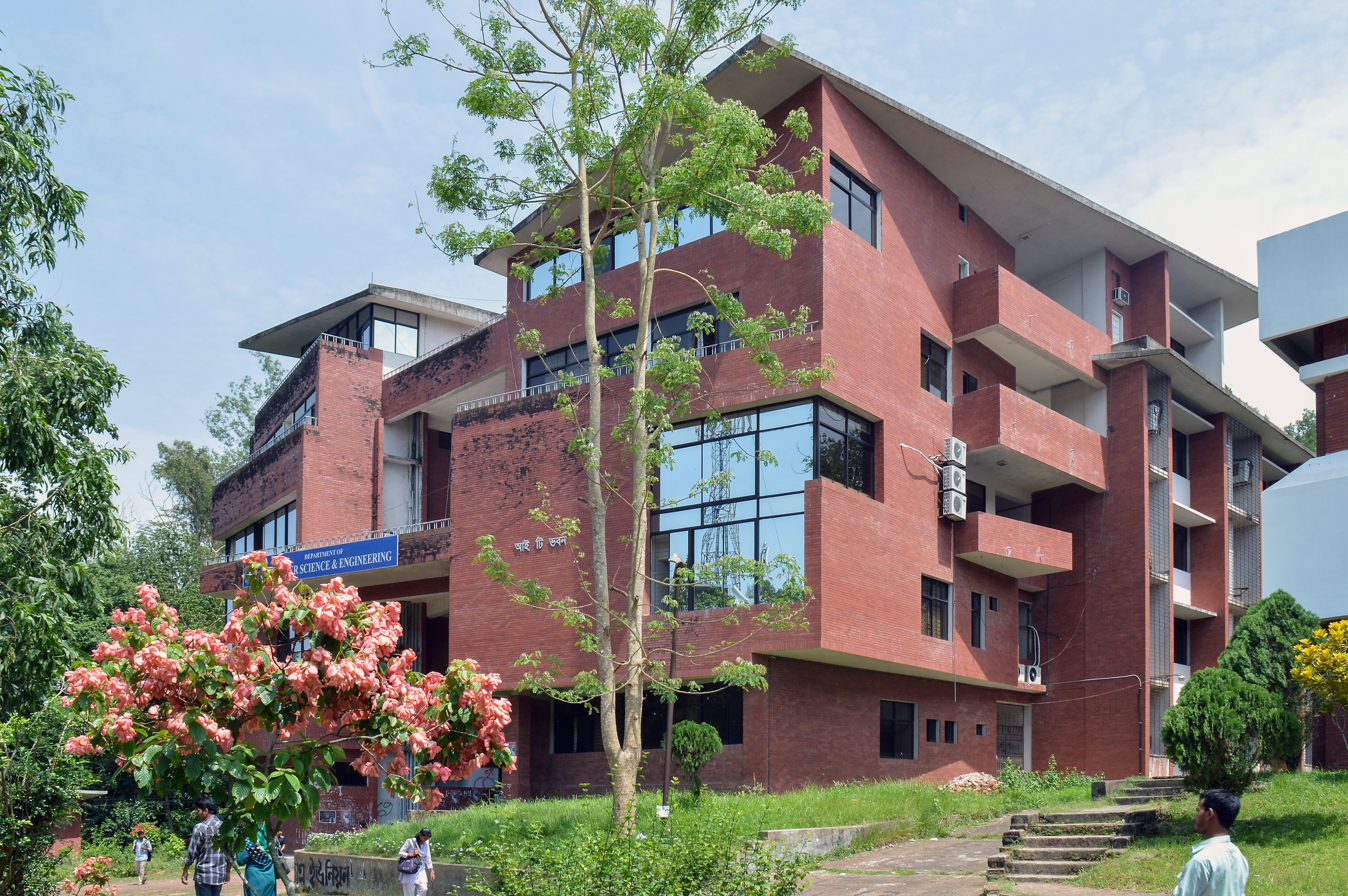
Department of Computer Science and Engineering at Chittagong University of Engineering & Technology

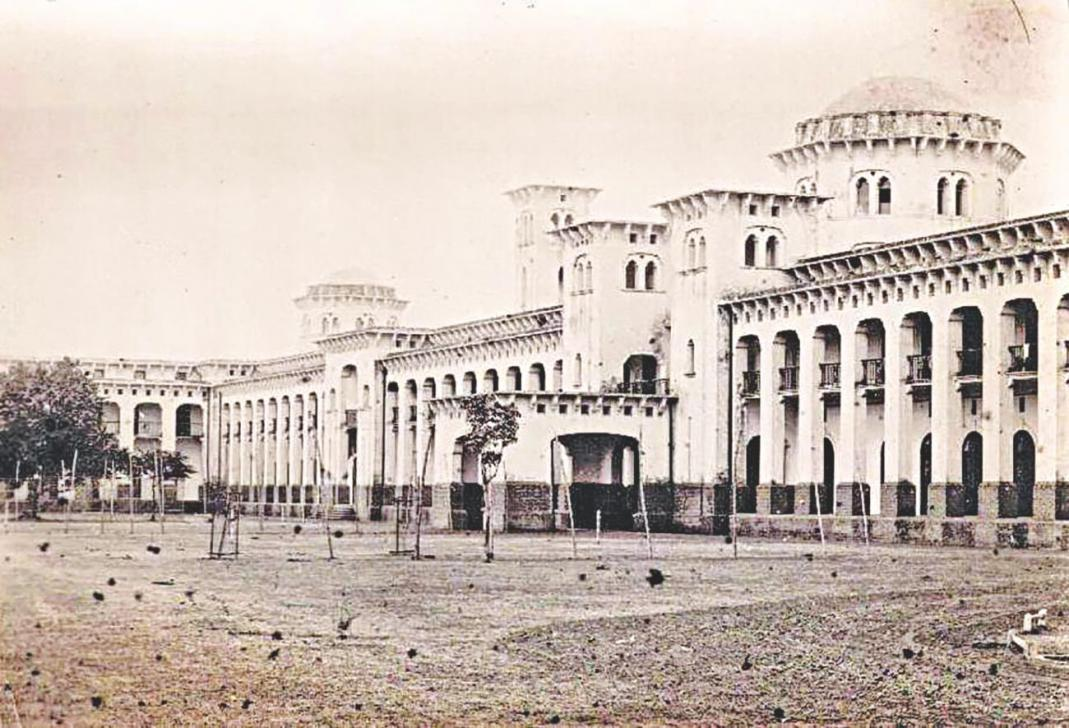
Dhaka Medical College and Hospital (1940s), Dhaka

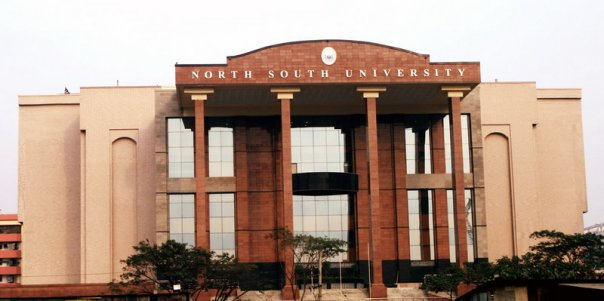
Front view of North South University (Private University), Dhaka

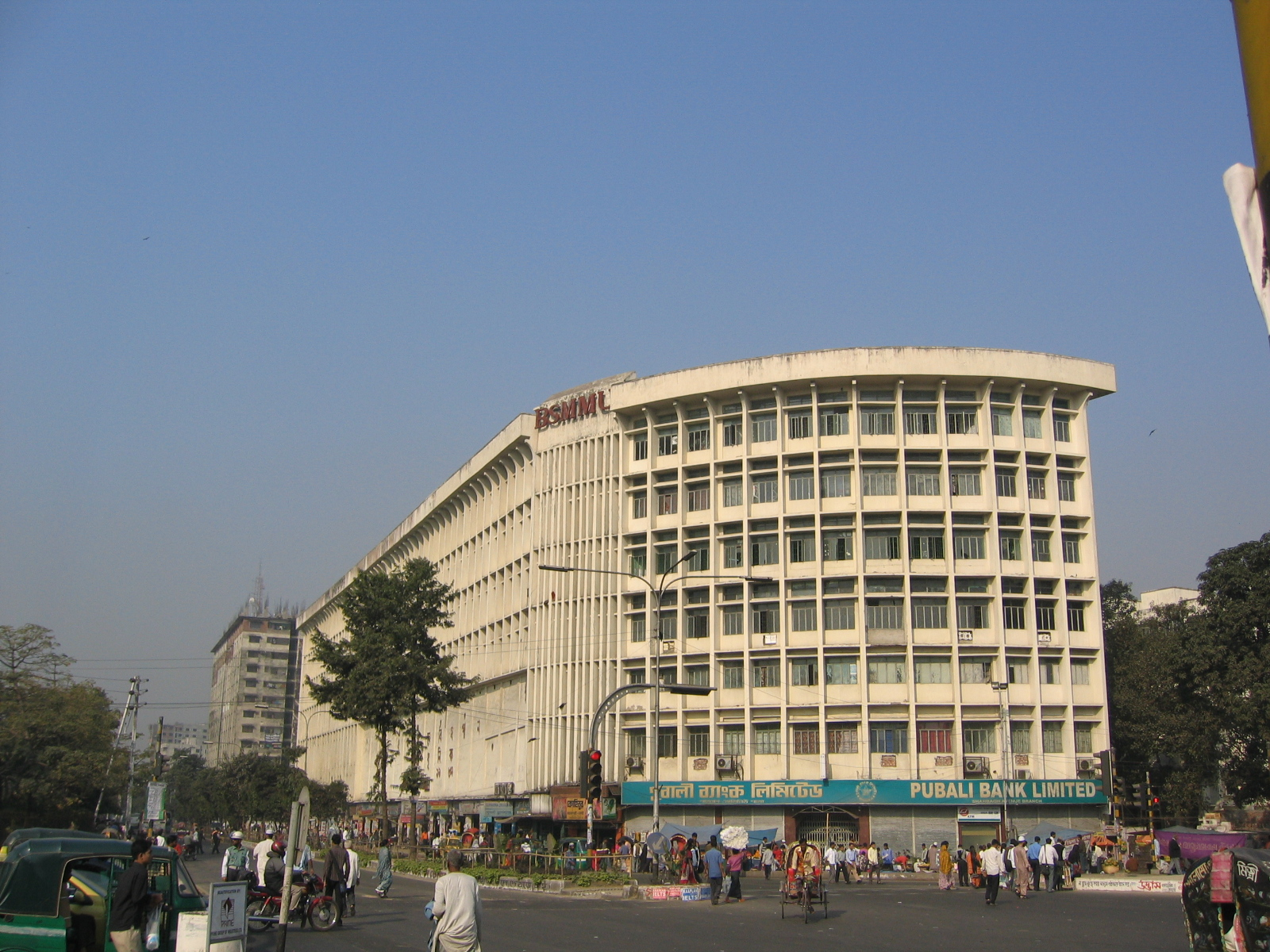
Bangabandhu Sheikh Mujib Medical University, Dhaka

At the tertiary level, universities are regulated by the University Grants Commission. There are three types of universities in Bangladesh: public, private, and international. Some colleges providing tertiary education are affiliated under the National University. Each of the private medical colleges is affiliated with a public university. Universities in Bangladesh are autonomous bodies administered by statutory bodies such as Syndicate, Senate, Academic Council, etc. in accordance with provisions laid down in their respective acts.

Universities in Bangladesh represents about 150 academic bodies of conventional higher educational institutions (HEI) in Bangladesh. Segmented by management and financial structure, these include 43 public universities, 103 private universities, 2 international universities, 31 specialized colleges, and 2 special universities. There are specialized universities in all categories offering courses principally in technological studies, medical studies, business studies and Islamic studies. There are two private universities dedicated solely to female students. The number of universities is growing mostly in and around the capital city of Dhaka.

Public Universities

Public universities are heavily subsidized by Government of Bangladesh to let students from most financial conditions study in these institutes. They admit students via competitive written standardized tests after meeting eligible High School grade criteria with little to no regards for extracurricular activities. Number of foreign teachers and students in these universities are very limited although many of them accept students passing from alternative curriculums.

Private Universities

Most universities in Bangladesh are private. Unlike public universities, they are not given financial support by the government of Bangladesh. They're regulated by the University Grants Commission along with public universities. By law, all private universities must get a permanent campus within 12 years of starting operations. Foreign students and teachers are more often found in private universities due to more flexible requirements than their public counterparts. Private medical colleges must be under a public university, currently no private medical college in Bangladesh is providing post graduate degrees, and other private universities are allowed to provide master's degree but not MPhil or PhD.

=== Technical and vocational education ===
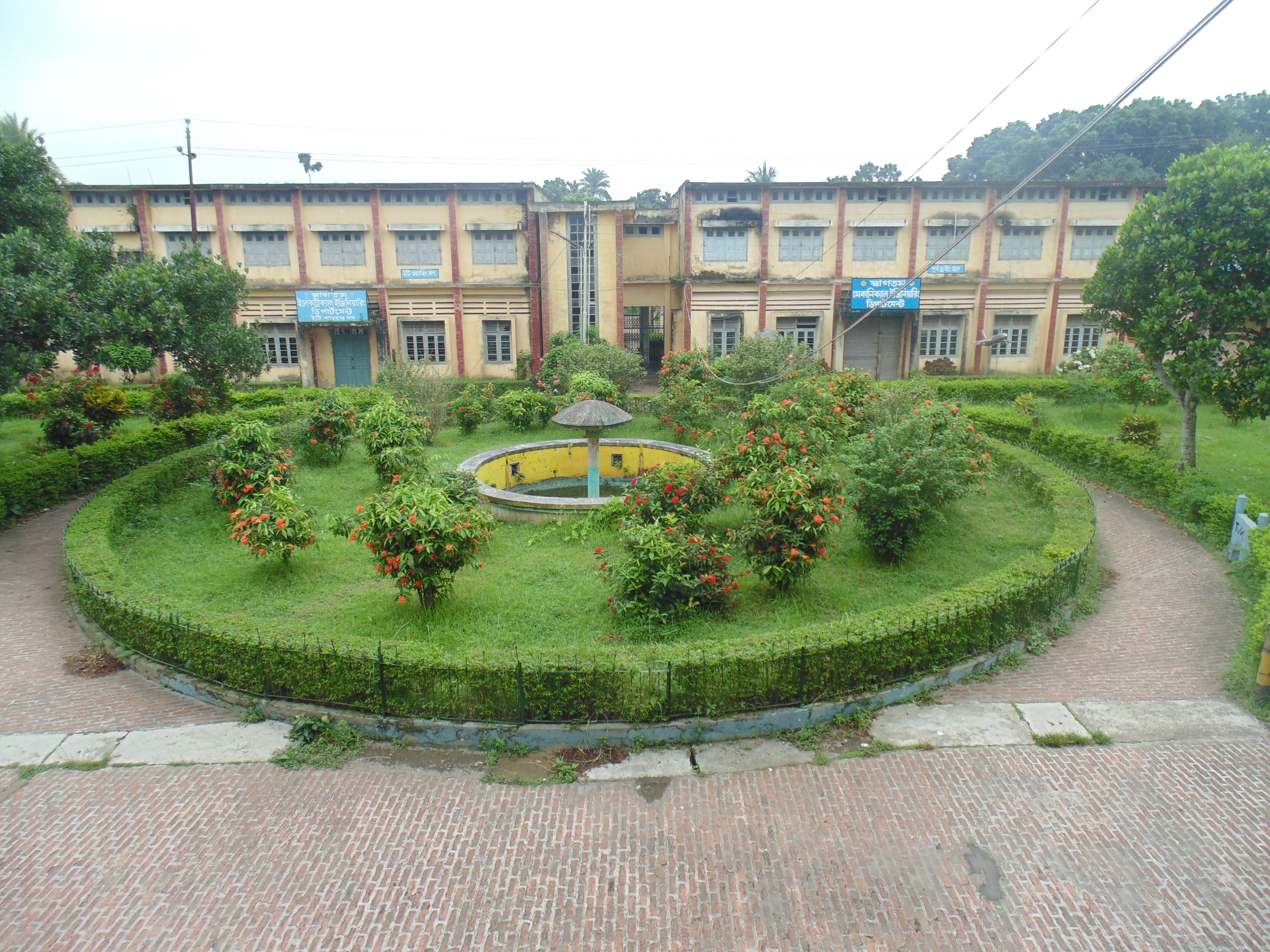
Jessore Polytechnic Institute, Jessore.

The Technical and Vocational Education System provides courses related to various applied and practical areas of science, technology and engineering, or focuses on a specific specialized area. Course duration ranges from one month to four years. The Technical Education Board controls technical and vocational training in the secondary level and also Two years HSC BM/Vocational in higher secondary level.

The Directorate of Technical Education (DTE) is responsible for the planning, development, and implementation of technical and vocational education in the country. Curriculum is implemented by BTEB. In the Technical Education System, after obtaining a Diploma-in-Engineering degree (four-year curriculum) from the institutes listed below, students can further pursue their educational career by obtaining a bachelor's degree from Engineering & Technology Universities. It normally it takes an additional two and a half to three years of coursework to obtain a bachelor's degree, although some students take more than three years to do so. They can then enroll in post-graduate studies. Students can also study CA (Chartered Accounting) after passing HSC or bachelor's degree and subject to fulfilling the entry criteria of the Institute of Chartered Accountants of Bangladesh (ICAB). According to Bangladesh Bank, there are 39 C. A firms in Bangladesh eligible for auditing banks and finance companies.

- Bangladesh Sweden Polytechnic Institute
- Barishal Polytechnic Institute
- BCMC College of Engineering & Technology
- Bogura Polytechnic Institute
- Brahmanbaria Polytechnic Institute
- Chittagong Polytechnic Institute
- Dhaka Polytechnic Institute
- Feni Polytechnic Institute
- Graphic Arts Institute
- Jessore Polytechnic Institute
- Khulna Polytechnic Institute
- Kushtia Polytechnic Institute
- Kishoreganj Polytechnic Institute
- Magura polytechnic institute
- Mangrove Institute of Science and Technology
- Mymensingh Polytechnic Institute
- Patuakhali Polytechnic Institute
- Rajshahi Polytechnic Institute
- Sylhet Polytechnic Institute
- Satkhira Polytechnic Institute

== Alternative education system ==
=== International schools ===
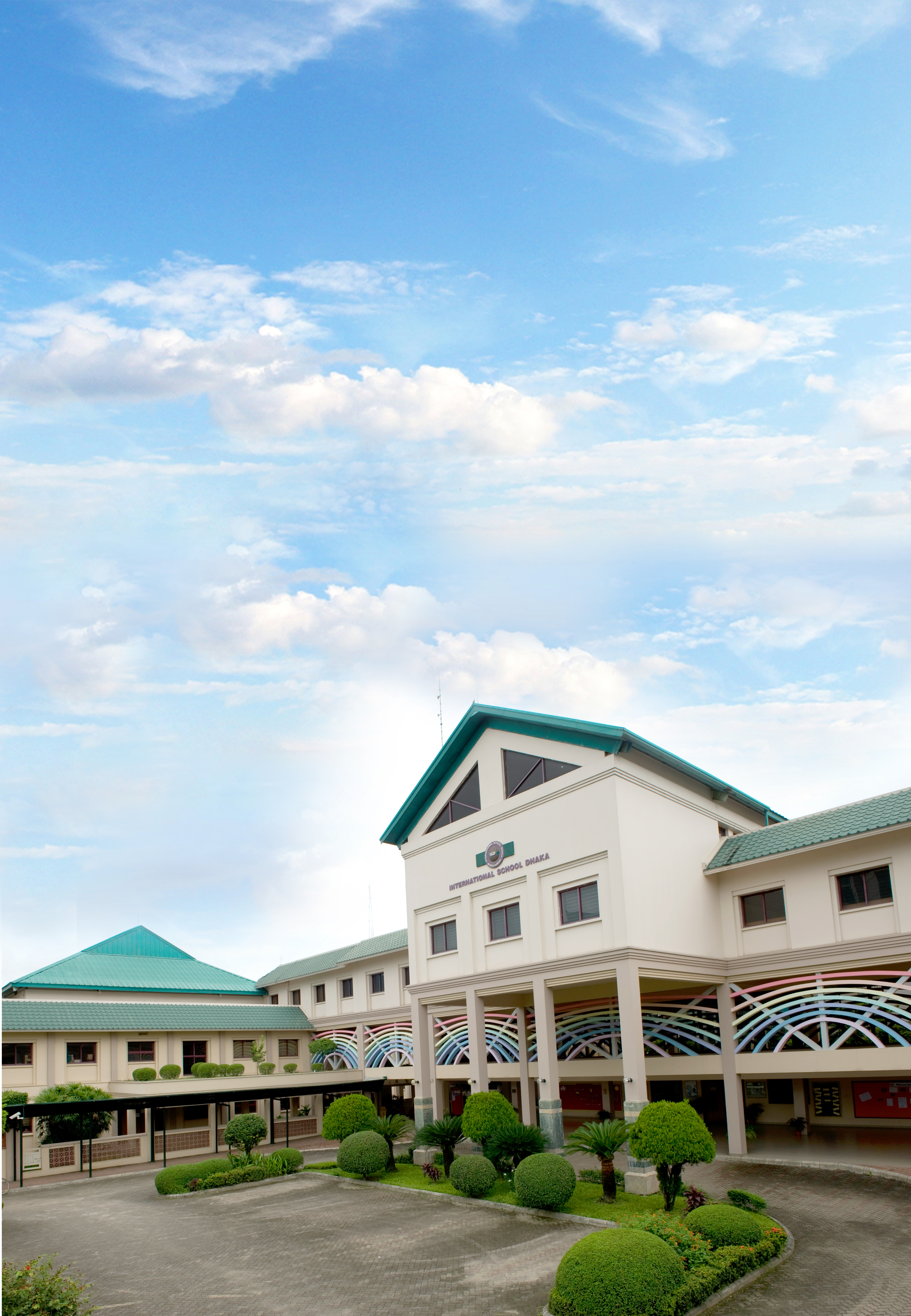
International School Dhaka, an IB World school in Dhaka

International Schools are mainly private schools where all the courses are taught in English and in international curriculums except language subjects i.e., Bangla or French. These schools in Bangladesh follow the Cambridge Assessment International Education, Pearson Edexcel, International Baccalaureate and some other curriculums where students are prepared for taking their Ordinary Level (O Level) IGCSE (Cambridge) or International GCSE (Edexcel), Advanced Level (A Level), and IBDP examinations. The Ordinary level, IGCSE, International GCSE, Advanced Level, IBDP examinations are considered to be the international equivalent to the Secondary School Certificate (SSC) and Higher Secondary School Certificate (HSC) examinations respectively and accepted by local colleges and universities.

Most students sit for these exams through attending the registered schools in Bangladesh who follow the curriculums. Those who do not attend a school that follows the British curriculums (not International Baccalaureate) may also sit for their Ordinary, IGCSE and Advanced Level examinations from the British Council as a private candidate. These examinations are conducted under the supervision of the British Council in Bangladesh. The school examinations conducted by the British Council takes place twice a year. Currently, there are two boards operating from Bangladesh for Ordinary and Advanced Level Examinations, which are Pearson Edexcel and Cambridge Assessment International Education. However, Bangladesh has recently opened English version schools translating National Curriculum textbooks into English except the mandatory Bangla subject.

=== Madrasah education ===
The Madrasah-related Islamic education system focuses on Islamic education, teaching all the basics of education in a religious environment. Islamic studies are taught in Arabic, Bengali, and sometimes even in English. During the East Pakistan era, religious educational institutions also taught in Urdu. The students in some areas also serves local masjids. Students also have to complete all the courses from the General Education System. Many privately licensed Madrasas take in homeless children and provides them with food, shelter and education, e.g., Jamia Tawakkulia Renga Madrasah in Sylhet.

There are two types of madrasas in Bangladesh. One, the "Qawmi" madrasas, are privately funded. The other, the "Alia" madrasas, are privately owned but subsidized by the government (the government spends 11.5% of its education budget on alia madrasahs, paying 80% of teacher and administrator salaries). Qawmi madrasahs account for 1.9% of total primary enrollment and 2.2% of secondary enrollment; Alia madrasahs account for 8.4% of primary and 19% of secondary enrollment. The alia system is like the general education system, except that Arabic is taught in addition to general education. The Madrasah Education Board covers religious education in government-registered Madrasahs in the secondary level. After passing "Alim", a student can enroll for three additional years to obtain a "Fazil" level. Students can go for further general education and earn a university degree. After passing successfully, they can further enroll for another two years to obtain a "Kamil" level degree.

The following table provides a statistical comparison of the "Qawmi" and "Alia" madrasah systems.

==== Profile of madrasa education in Bangladesh ====
Madrasa type	No. of Madrasa	No. of Students	No. of Teachers
Government-funded (Alia) Madrasa	10,450	2 million	100,732
Private (Qawmi) Madrasa	15,000	4 million	200,000

=== Refugee education ===
Due to the Rohingya genocide, thousands of Rohingyas fled to Bangladesh in order to survive the ethnic cleansing. The government has had difficulties in managing the crisis, particularly when it comes to the education of refugees since most Rohingyas were illiterate because they were denied their right to education as a part of persecution. As of 2020, approximately one-third of Rohingya children refugees were able to access primary education, primarily through temporary centers run by international organizations. UNICEF runs approximately 1,600 learning centers across the country, educating around 145,000 children. Beginning in April 2020, UNICEF and the government of Bangladesh were scheduled to enroll 10,000 Rohingya children in schools where they will be taught the Myanmar school curriculum.

=== Non-formal education ===
There exists a substantial number of NGO-run non-formal schools, catering mainly to the dropouts of the government and non-government primary schools. Very few NGOs, however, impart education for the full five-year primary education cycle. Because of this, on completion of their two-to-three-year non-formal primary education in NGO-run schools, students normally re-enter into government/non-government primary schools at higher classes.

There are non-governmental schools (NGO) and non-formal educational centers (NFE) and many of these are funded by the government. The largest NFE program is the much reputed BRAC program. However, not all NFE graduates continue on to secondary school.

NGO-run schools differ from other non-government private schools. While the private schools operate like private enterprises often guided by commercial interests, NGO schools operate mainly in areas not served either by the government or private schools, essentially to meet the educational needs of vulnerable groups in the society. They usually follow an informal approach to suit the special needs of children from these vulnerable groups. But nowadays, some NGO schools are operating into places where there are both private and government schools.

Similarly, in NGO-run schools, The style of management differs depending upon differences in policies pursued by different NGOs. Some are centrally managed within a highly bureaucratic set-up, while others enjoy considerable autonomy.

Different NGOs pursue different policies regarding recruitment of teachers. Some prepare a panel of prospective teachers on the basis of a rigorous test and recruit teachers from this panel. Other NGOs recruit teachers rather informally from locally available interested persons.

== Grading system ==
In Bangladesh, grades equal or above 33% (or one third) is considered as a passing grade.

Since the education system of Bangladesh is completely controlled by the government up to higher secondary level (or grade 12), the grading system up to this point is more or less the same. For each subject, grades are converted into 'grade points (GP)' and are summed up and divided by the total number of subjects, and thus is called 'grade point average (GPA)'. The highest achievable GPA is 5.0. There is also a 'letter grade (LG)' that indicates a range of GPA for total result, or a single GP for a single subject. The grading system is shown below.

Letter grade system of individual subject
Class interval	Grade point	Letter grade
100-80	5	A+
79 -70	4	A
69–60	3.5	A-
59–50	3	B
49 -40	2	C
39–33	1	D
32–0	0	F

However, in secondary and higher secondary Level, a fourth subject or optional subject system is introduced. Although failing in the fourth subject will not be judged as a failure for the whole, doing good in it can contribute to gain additional grade points. The additional grade points received is simply (GP in 4th subject) – 2. While counting GPA the algorithm can be simply written as:

$GPA = \tfrac{TGP+OGP}{N}$

Here, TGP is the total grade points gained in subjects other than optional. OGP is the additional GP gained in 4th subject. N is the number of total subjects of course without optional.

Note that GPA cannot be above 5. Additional GP gained from the optional subject will not be counted if the GP of the subject is less than or equal to 2.

Gaining a GPA of 5.0 or A+ is naturally considered as a good result. However, since a student can gain grade far above the required 80% to receive a GPA of 5.0, the actual grades received in each subject is also included in the official mark sheets given by the education board for PSC, JSC, SSC and HSC exams. There is also an unofficial term called Golden A+ which means receiving A+ in all subjects, since a student can receive a perfect GPA also without gaining more than 80% marks in all subjects thanks to the fourth subject system.

== Religious education ==
Religious education is also included in the country's national curriculum. The national curriculum offers religious education for four of the most dominant religions in Bangladesh. It includes Islam, Hinduism, Buddhism and Christianity. Despite the fact that non-Muslims receive their own respective religious education in Bangladesh, a lot of schools don't have non-Muslim religion teachers. Due to this, a lot of non-Muslims students in Bangladesh have to study their religious subjects solo. Non-Muslim students tend to study their religious subjects alongside their parents, or study in coaching centers, or study alongside a tutor, or study with a local religious scholar, or study in their local religious monasteries or institutions. The schools that have religion teachers of different beliefs separate students to take class on their respective religions for the class period, then they mix up together again after finishing the class. However, Islamic Prophet Muhammad's life-related events and Hindu mythological stories like the Ramayana is also included in country's national curricula and taught to all students regardless of their religions, beliefs and caste in different classes in different subjects. Islamic History and Heritage is also included in humanities at college level. Islamic education in Bangladesh is heavily influenced by madrasahs.

== Current issues and areas for improvement ==
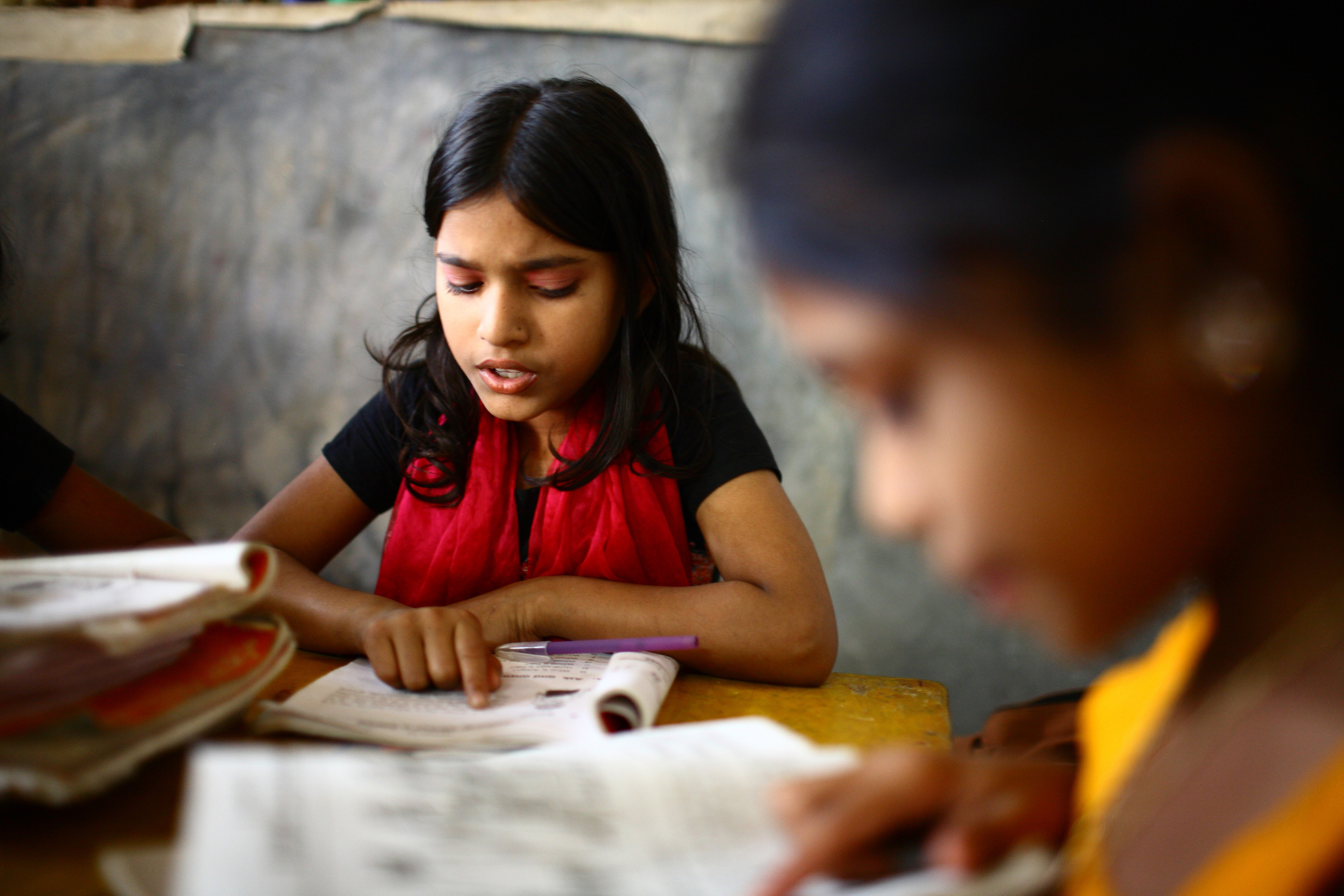
Girls studying at the Unique Child Learning Center in Mirpur-Dhaka

Current government projects to promote the education of children in Bangladesh include compulsory primary education for all, free education for girls up to class 10, stipends for female students, a nationwide integrated education system and a food-for-education literacy movement. A large section of the country's national budget is set aside to help put these programs into action and to promote education and make it more accessible. Recent years have seen these efforts making progress and the Bangladesh education system is ahead of what it was only a few years ago. Now, even national curriculum books from class 5 to class 12 are distributed freely among all students and schools.

The educational system of Bangladesh faces several problems. In the past, Bangladesh education was primarily a British modelled upper-class affair with all courses given in English and very little being done for the common people. The Bangladesh education board has taken steps to leave such practices in the past and is looking forward to education as a way to provide a poverty-stricken nation with a brighter future. As Bangladesh is an overpopulated country, there is a huge demand to turn its population into labor, which is why proper education is needed and proper help from government in the educational sectors of Bangladesh is crucial.

Universities and the existing system of academic curricula in Bangladesh are not still observed to be encouraging industry-oriented critical thinking and primarily utilizing rote-learning which encourages passivity under a corporatized model as well as the country has not implemented Outcome-based-Education (OBE) blended system yet, encompassing classroom and laboratory-based teachings with industry-oriented practical learnings for undergraduate and postgraduate engineering academic degrees.

=== Education expenditure as percentage of GDP ===
Public expenditure on education lies on the fringes of 2 percent of GDP with a minimum of 0.94 percent in 1980 and a maximum of 2.2 percent in 2007.

=== Qualitative dimension ===
The education system lacks a sound Human Resource Development and deployment system, and this has demoralized the primary education sector personnel, including teachers, and contributes to poor performance. Poverty is a big threat to primary education. In Bangladesh, the population is very high. The number of seats available in colleges is less than the number of students who want to enroll, and the number of seats available in universities is also less than the number of students who passed higher secondary level and want to join in a university. The cost of education is increasing day by day, and as a result many students are unable to afford it.

One study found a 15.5% primary school teacher absence rate.

=== Gender disparity ===
In Bangladesh, gender discrimination in education occurs amongst the rural households but is non-existent amongst mid to rich households. Bangladesh has achieved gender parity in Primary and Secondary education with significant progress made in higher education. There is great difference in the success rates of boys, as compared to girls in Bangladesh. Girls have improved performance and success rates among females have exceeded growth rates among males in some areas in Bangladesh.

=== School attendance ===
The low performance in primary education is a matter of concern, mostly in rural areas. School drop-out rates and grade repetition rates are high in rural areas. Poor school attendance and low contact time in school are factors contributing to low level of learning achievement. However, the situation is very different in urban areas like Dhaka.

== Literacy rate ==
According to the 2022 Census of Bangladesh, the literacy rate of Bangladesh was 74.66% in 2022. Prior to this national census, Bangladesh's literacy rate was 51.77% in 2011 according to the 2011 Census of Bangladesh. The literacy rate of Bangladesh increased by 23.11% in 2022 compared to 2011.

== See also ==
- Light of Hope
- List of schools in Bangladesh
- List of zilla schools of Bangladesh
- List of English-medium schools in Bangladesh
- List of Qawmi Madrasas in Bangladesh
- List of colleges in Bangladesh
- List of institutes in Bangladesh
- List of cadet colleges in Bangladesh
- List of medical colleges in Bangladesh
- List of dental schools in Bangladesh
- Textile schools in Bangladesh
- List of architecture schools in Bangladesh
- List of universities in Bangladesh
- University Grants Commission (Bangladesh)
- List of Intermediate and Secondary Education Boards in Bangladesh
- Bangladesh Madrasah Education Board
- Bangladesh Technical Education Board
