= International Schools in Chittagong =

Chittagong has a diverse and modern education system with many schools/learning centres offering international academic programs. Most institutions follow British-style curricula through Pearson Edexcel, Cambridge International Education and Oxford AQA. These systems, often supported by the British Council, provide standardized international education in the region.

Some independent institutions have their own unique international educational approaches, adding variety to the district's education landscape.

== Independent ==
Name	Location	Curriculum	Levels	Intake
Union Halls	Sitakunda	Blended (American/Canadian)	PreK-16	September
William Carey Academy	Nasirabad	American	K-12	August

== Standardized ==
Name	Location	Curriculum	Levels	Intake
Chittagong Grammar School	Kotwali	CIE	K-12	June/July
CIDER International School	Bayzid	CIE	K-12	June/July
Sunshine Grammar School	Nasirabad	CIE/Edexcel	K-12	June/July
International Hope School Bangladesh	Muradpur	CIE	K-12	June/July
Frobel Academy	Quaish	CIE	K-10	June/July
AUW Laboratory School	Chatteswari	CIE	5-10	June/July
Little Jewels School	Katalgonj	CIE/Edexcel	K-12	June/July
Presidency International School	Panchlaish	CIE	K-12	June/July
