= English version schools (Bangladesh) =

System of Education In Bangladesh

English version school is a system of education in Bangladesh that follows the Bangla medium school curriculum and is based upon textbooks translated from the Bengali language into English. There are approximately 52 English version schools in Dhaka. In 2011, the first Internet-based English version school opened in Gazipur.

== History ==
The government of Bangladesh opened the first English version schools in cadet colleges in the late 1990s.

English version is different from English medium schools. While English medium schools follow the curriculum of Edexcel or Cambridge International Examination, English version schools follow the national curriculum and hold national examinations in English. English versions schools are usually less costly than English medium schools.

Zia Hasan International School in Tangail and Dinajpur Laboratory School & College in Dinajpur in 2010 became the first English version schools in a rural area.

== See also ==
- Education in Bangladesh
- List of English-medium schools in Bangladesh
- List of schools in Bangladesh
- List of zilla schools of Bangladesh
- List of colleges in Bangladesh
- List of universities in Bangladesh
- Textile schools in Bangladesh
- List of medical colleges in Bangladesh
- List of dental schools in Bangladesh
