= Zillul Karim =

Zillul Karim (born 4 January 1987) is the co-founder of several initiatives aimed at improving educational and parenting resources in Bangladesh.

== Biography ==
Karim worked in the corporate sector for years before he co-founded Light of Hope, a project providing educational tools to children. The organization has reached over 30,000 children with its innovative learning tools. He is also the founder of ToguMogu, a parenting application that, as of 2024, has "over 200,000 users".

Karim’s experiences, including his parents' separation, inspired him to support children's development. He has stated that Light of Hope aims to foster creativity, problem-solving abilities, emotional understanding, and the teaching of positive values in children.

== Recognition and awards ==
Karim has been recognized for his work in education and parenting support.

During the COVID-19 pandemic in Bangladesh, Karim submitted a project under the government's Access to Information initiative and was awarded 1st runner-up. receiving financial support for the project's execution.

In 2022, Karim received the Basis National ICT Award for his work on the ToguMogu app.
