= Primary Education Completion (Bangladesh) =

Primary school examination in Bangladesh

The Primary Education Completion Certificate (PECE) or Primary School Certificate (PSC) Examination was a national examination in Bangladesh administered by the Ministry of Primary and Mass Education, and taken by all students near the end of their fifth year in primary school. The exams were introduced in 2009 by the Ministry of Education of Bangladesh.

The PEC exam did not held for two years (2020 & 2022) due to the coronavirus pandemic. Later, the government announced that the test would be scrapped as a new curriculum was on the way. After 13 years, Government reintroduced scholarship exams for Class 5 students from 2022. At least 10 percent of fifth graders in every school across the country will be able to take part in the scholarship exams. Students who qualify for the talent-pool stipend receive Tk 300 per month, while general stipend recipients receive Tk 225 per month until they complete Grade 8.
