= Junior Laboratory High School =

Bangladeshi high school

Coordinates: 23.7475°N 90.3735°E

Information
- Established: 1984; 42 years ago
- Language: Bengali, English
- Website: https://jlhs.edu.bd/

Junior Laboratory High School was established in 1984 in Dhaka, Bangladesh. The school is located in the heart of Dhaka city in the Dhanmondi area. It teaches students from nursery to SSC level in Bangla medium and up to O level in English medium.
