= Junior School Certificate =

School examination in Bangladesh

The Junior School Certificate (JSC) was a public examination taken by students in Bangladesh after successful completion of eight years of schooling. It was introduced in 2010. It is followed by the Secondary School Certificate (SSC).

Before the introduction of the JSC, a similar examination known as Madhyamik Britti (Junior Scholarship) was held. This was a voluntary vocational exam and not mandatory, which were later made mandatory and renamed as junior school certificate. In 2019, last JSC exam was held. Due to the COVID-19 outbreak, the exams could not be held in 2020 and 2021. The government also decided not to hold the Junior School Certificate (JSC) and Junior Dakhil Certificate (JDC) examinations in 2022. In 2023, The ministry of education of Bangladesh stated that there will be no JSC-JDC examination in the new curriculum. From 2024, class VIII and class IX exams was planned to be held under the new syllabus.Although, the voluntary Madhyamik Britti or Junior Scholarship was bought back.

== Mark distribution system ==
The education boards of Bangladesh have provided the result based on GPA (grade point average), which depends on each subject average grade point (GP). Marks above 80 will count as GP 5.00 or A+, while marks above 70 will count as GP 4.00 or A. However, prior to 2018, there was a 4th-subject system that could cover up to 3 A+ grades if a student achieved an A+ in the 4th subject. For better understanding, the marks distribution chart is provided below.

Marks range	Grade point (GP)	Letter grade (LG)
0 to 32	0.00	F
33 to 39	1.00	D
40 to 49	2.00	C
50 to 59	3.00	B
60 to 69	3.50	A-
70 to 79	4.00	A
80 to 100	5.00	A+

== See also ==
- Secondary School Certificate (SSC)
- Higher Secondary (School) Certificate (HSC)
- General Certificate of Secondary Education (GCSE)
