= Sydney International School =

Australian school in Bangladesh

Coordinates: 23.8020°N 90.4235°E

Information
- School type: International school
- Established: 2012; 14 years ago
- Age: 3 to 16
- Language: English

Sydney International School (SIS) is an international school located in Dhaka, Bangladesh, for 3-16 year old pupils. It was founded in 2012, and offers the Australian Curriculum for primary years and the Cambridge Curriculum for secondary years. Lessons are taught in English.

== School sections ==
SIS offers three programs for students which include Early Childhood, Middle and Senior.

== History ==
Sydney International School was set up by Bangladeshi Business Person Mynul Mridha. SIS was set up in January 2012. Lessons are taught in English but emphasising equal proficiency in Bengali.
