= Rajshahi Polytechnic Institute =

Government Polytechnic Institute of Bangladesh

- রাজশাহী পলিটেকনিক ইনস্টিটিউট
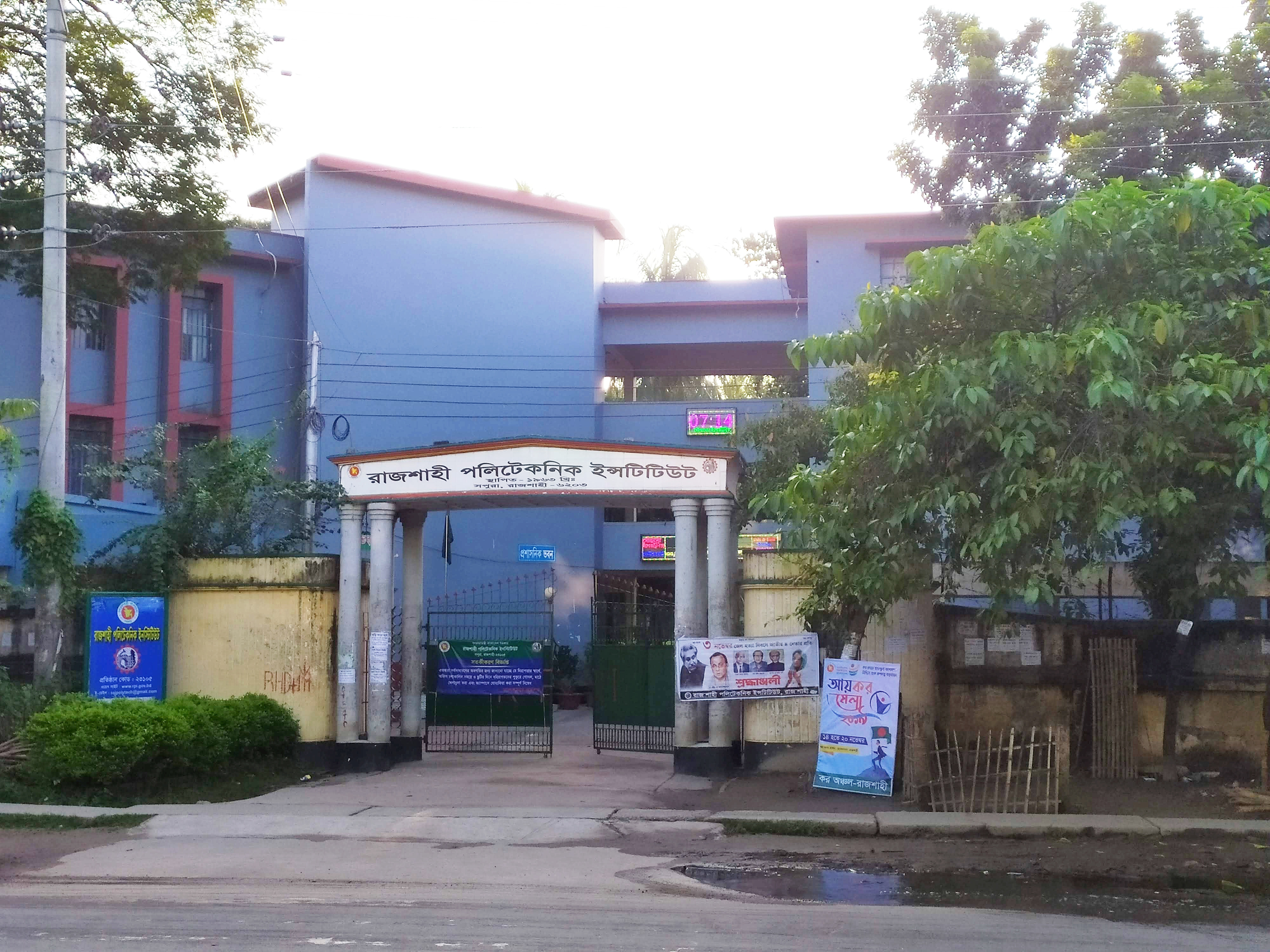
- Main gate of Rajshahi Polytechnic Institute
- Type: Public
- Established: 1963; 63 years ago
- Accreditation: Bangladesh Technical Education Board
- Principal: Abu Hanif
- Location: Sapura, Rajshahi, Bangladesh; 24.3792°N 88.6018°E
- Campus: Urban
- Website: www.rpi.gov.bd

Rajshahi Polytechnic Institute (Bengali: রাজশাহী পলিটেকনিক ইনস্টিটিউট) is a government engineering institute located in Rajshahi, Bangladesh. It was established in 1963. It offers 4-year Diploma in Engineering courses under the Bangladesh Technical Education Board.

== History ==
Rajshahi Polytechnic Institute was established in 1963 at Sapora of Rajshahi. The campus is 14.69 acres (5.94 ha). The institute has seven academic buildings.

== Academic programs ==
It offers four-year diplomas in the following areas:

- Civil Engineering
- Electrical Engineering
- Mechanical Engineering
- Computer science and engineering
- Electronics Engineering
- Power Engineering
- Electromedical Engineering
- Mechatronics Engineering

== Gallery ==
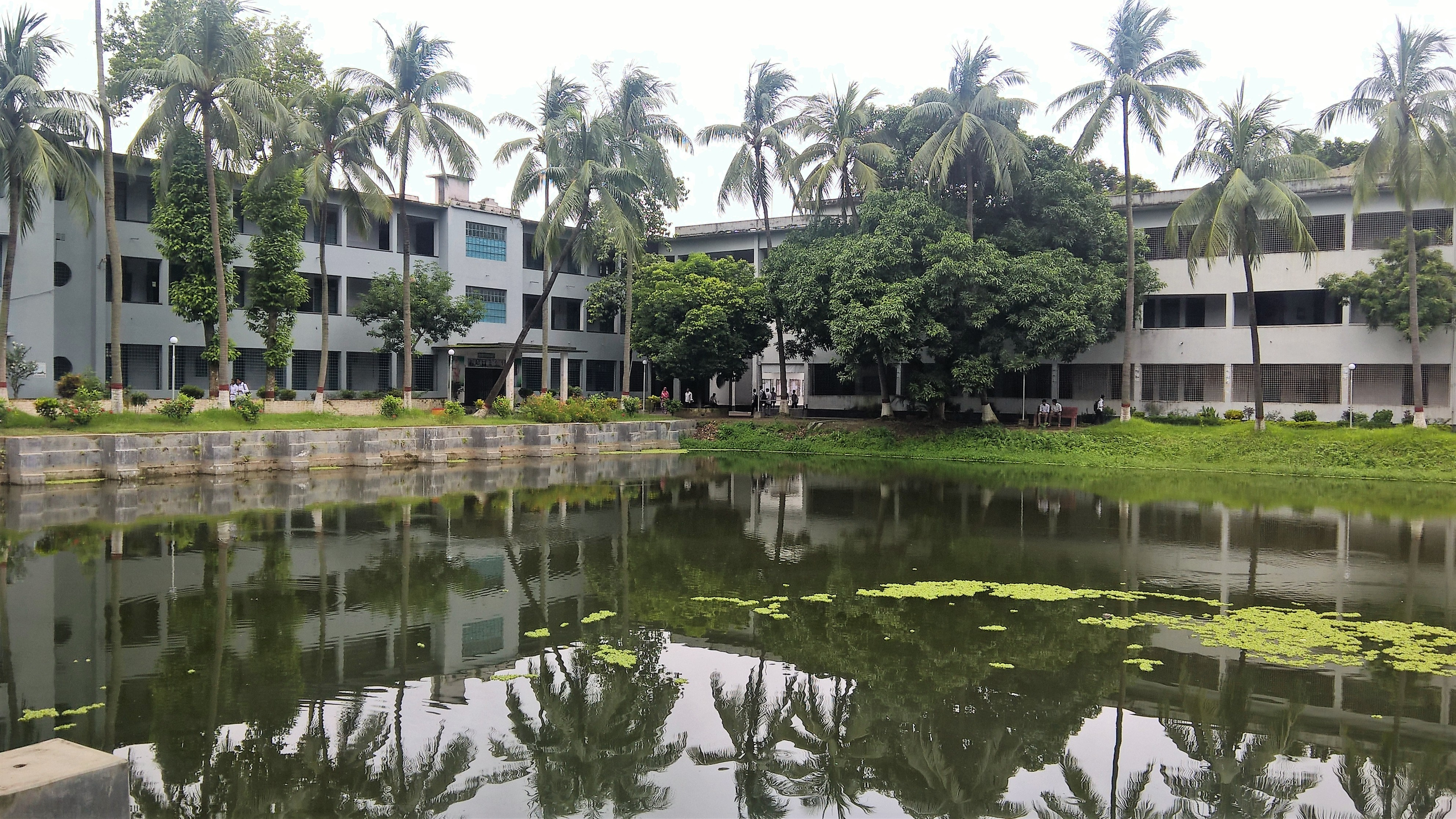
Campus of Rajshahi Polytechnic Institute

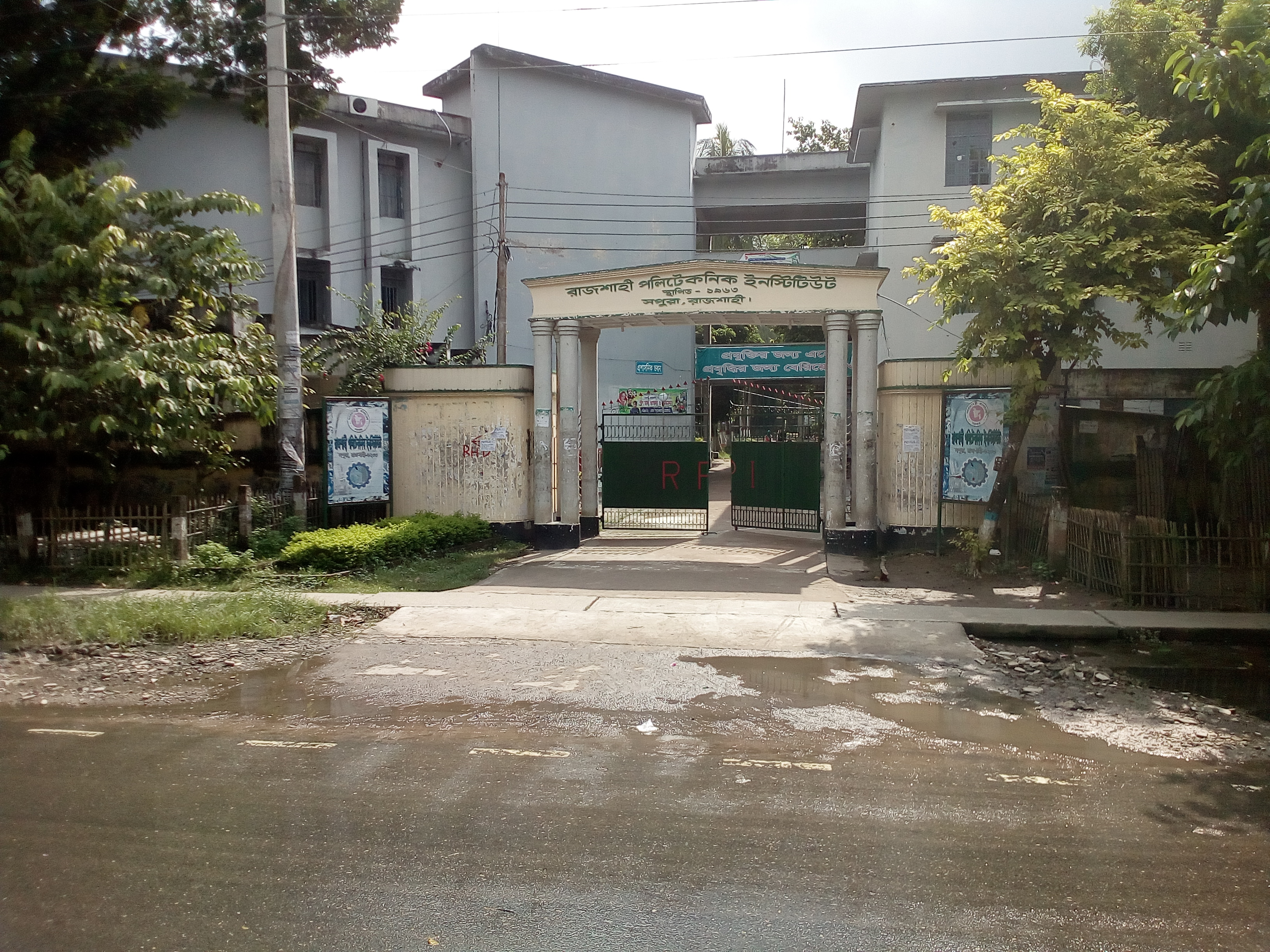
Rajshahi Polytechnic Institute

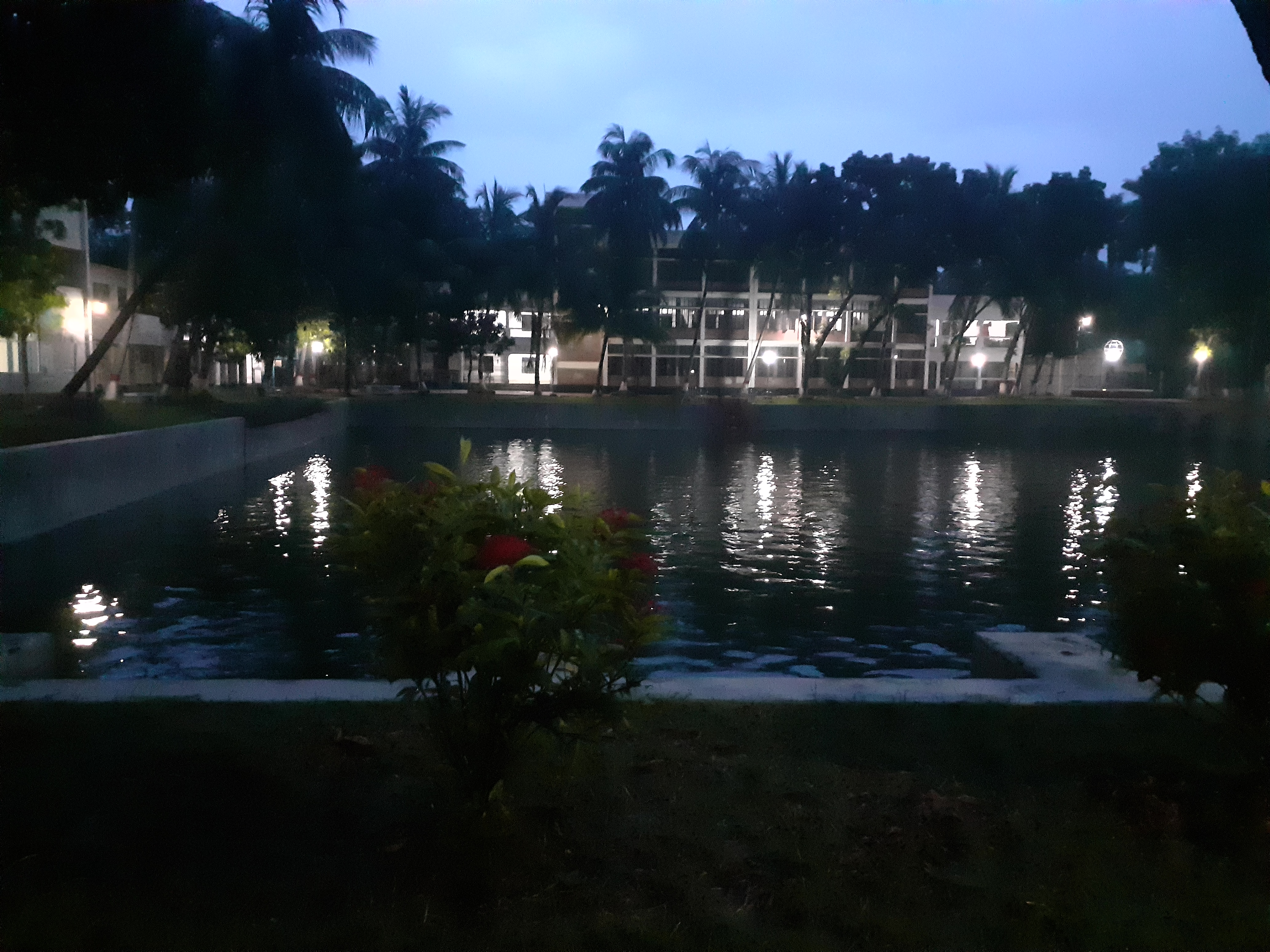
Rajshahi Polytechnic Institute at night

Academic building of Rajshahi Polytechnic Institute
