= Cardiff International School Dhaka =

School in Dhaka, Bangladesh

Cardiff International School Dhaka is an English-medium school in Dhaka, Bangladesh, that has classes from playgroup to A-Level. The school has an "honesty shop" that sells stationery but does not have shopkeepers.
