= Daffodil International School =

School in Dhaka District, Bangladesh

Daffodil International School is a school in Dhaka District, Bangladesh, owned by the Daffodil Group. It was founded in 2009. It has branches in Chandpur, Dhanmondi, Gazipur, Shohanbag, and Uttara, Bangladesh. It is associated with Daffodil International University.

== Academic ==
=== Medium of Education ===
- English Medium
- English Version
