= Park International School and College, Dhaka =

Park International School and College

Location
- House#327, Block#B,Khilgaon Taltola, Dhaka-1219; Bangladesh
- Coordinates: 23.7526°N 90.4201°E

Information
- Type: Private; Primary School (Play Group to 2nd Grade); Junior School (3rd Grade to 5th Grade); Senior School (6th Grade to 12th Grade)
- Established: 2009
- Principal: Md. Mohasin Mazumder
- Website: parkisbd.net

Park International School and College in Dhaka, Bangladesh started in the year of 2009.

The school follows the English Medium British Curriculum from Cambridge University.
