= Light of Hope =

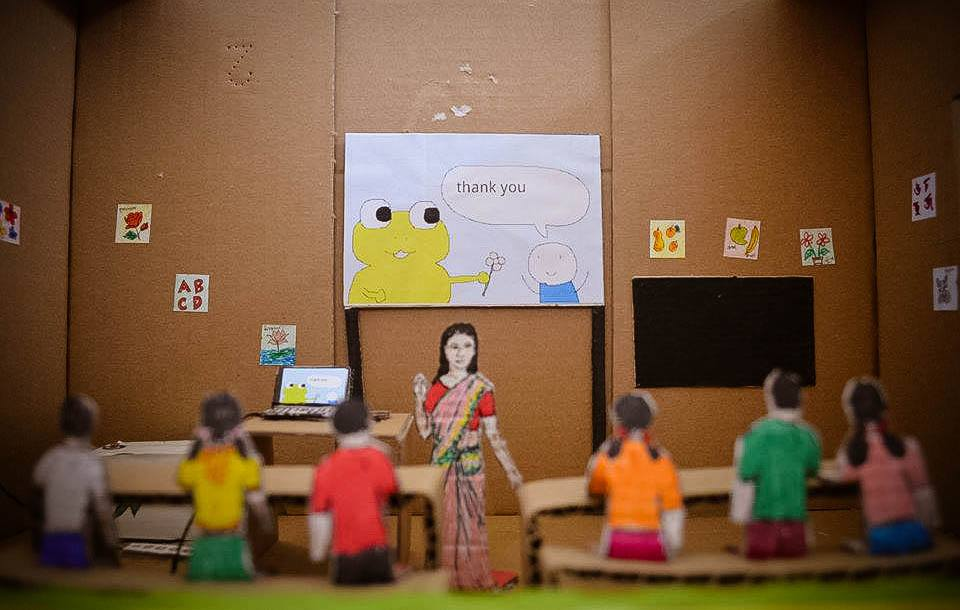
- Type: Educational Project (Provides and promotes e-education)
- Industry: Educational Content; Edutainment
- Founded: 2016; 10 years ago
- Founders: Waliullah Bhuiyan, Zillul Karim
- Headquarters: Dhaka, Bangladesh
- Area served: Bangladesh
- Key people: Waliullah Bhuiyan (CEO)Zillul Karim (COO)
- Website: lightofhopebd.com

Light of Hope (LoH) began as a project aimed at providing e-learning facilities to rural schools in Bangladesh. It was formally incorporated as a for-profit limited company in 2017, registered at the Joint Stock Companies registry in Bangladesh. In this project LoH provided laptops, projectors, audio-visual e-learning materials, and solar energy systems to schools in remote areas, where there is inadequate infrastructure and limited or no electricity. LoH also provided books and education materials to students in those remote areas.

The founders of LoH are Waliullah Bhuiyan, Nasimul Islam Maruf, Asaduzzaman Shoeb, and Zillul Karim. Bhuiyan previously worked at BRAC before leaving to lead Light of Hope full-time. In 2014, LoH opened its first solar-powered school in Bangladesh.

== History ==
=== Inspiration ===
Back in 2009, Waliullah Bhuiyan was working on a BRAC project in the small village of Patuakhali. Bhuiyan spoke with a group of women about how they make money for living. As there was no electricity in the area, some people from the local market developed ways to harness solar energy for electricity. The village's residents began going to the local market to pay to charge their cell phones. Electricity providers also profited. Some of the women decided to use the idea to earn money. Ambiya Khatun was the pioneer of this idea and applied it. She convinced her husband, who was a rickshaw puller, to start this business by buying a solar-energy system on monthly installments. The business was successful, which encouraged other people got involved, and the area was gradually developed. Bhuiyan was inspired by this improvement.

Bhuiyan made the plan of this project and shared it with his friends, Md Nasimul Islam Maruf and Md Asaduzzaman Shoeb. Bhuiyan had been pursuing a Master's degree in Energy and Environmental Management in Germany when the idea for Light of Hope took shape. Together they designed the project, but they did not have enough money to start the project nor any sponsors.

=== 2013 Dell Education Challenge ===
Dell issued its second Dell Education Challenge in 2013. The competition mainly focused on social entrepreneurship. It sought to inspire innovative ideas around the world to help solve issues in education, including those identified in a Dell-commissioned poll about new education models. The poll showed that respondents viewed a personalized approach to learning to be effective. More than 400 projects were submitted in the competition, and the winning teams could bring their ideas to fruition.

Bhuiyan, Maruf, and Shoeb shared their plan with their friends and family. As all three are engineers, they started thinking about how they can use the idea practically. In 2013, they were studying in different countries. They discussed joining the competition in a Skype meeting, and later submitted their project. Their idea got third place, and they were invited to Texas. Bhuiyan went to Texas for the final competition. The other participant teams had already taken their project on pilot phase, but Bhuiyan's idea was not in use due to a lack funding. They won third place and received $2500. After online crowdfunding, they gathered $4500. With a total sum of $7000, they started their pilot project.

== Poura – The Reader ==
LoH launched a project called "Poura – The Reader" for collecting books and establishing libraries at rural primary schools across the country. The project aimed to help poor children who cannot afford books. The project's team members collected books in different ways, such as collecting book donations (mainly primary-level storybooks) from different schools and universities. They also reached out to people and social organizations for donations. Maruf ran its first campaign on the American International University-Bangladesh (AIUB) campus and collected almost 200 books in one day. Due to the campaign's success, LoH wanted to spread the campaign across Bangladesh. They launched a Facebook event for collecting books and sent representatives to different universities to collect books. Organizations including BRAC, Room to Read, and Save the Children donated books. rokomari.com donated 200 books. LoH's goal was to create libraries in 500 schools by late 2020. The company subsequently established 620 libraries in schools across Bangladesh, providing more than 250,000 children with access to age-appropriate books.

== Awards ==
In 2018, Bhuiyan was named one of eight winners of the Unilever Young Entrepreneurs Awards, selected from 2,120 applicants from every continent. He received the award for developing Sputnique, a solar-powered multimedia classroom solution that fits inside a backpack, designed for off-grid primary schools in Bangladesh.

In 2023, Bhuiyan received the National SME Foundation Award in the Small Entrepreneur (Male) category, presented by Prime Minister Sheikh Hasina at the 11th National SME Fair held at Bangabandhu International Conference Centre in Dhaka.
