= Chittagong Grammar School =

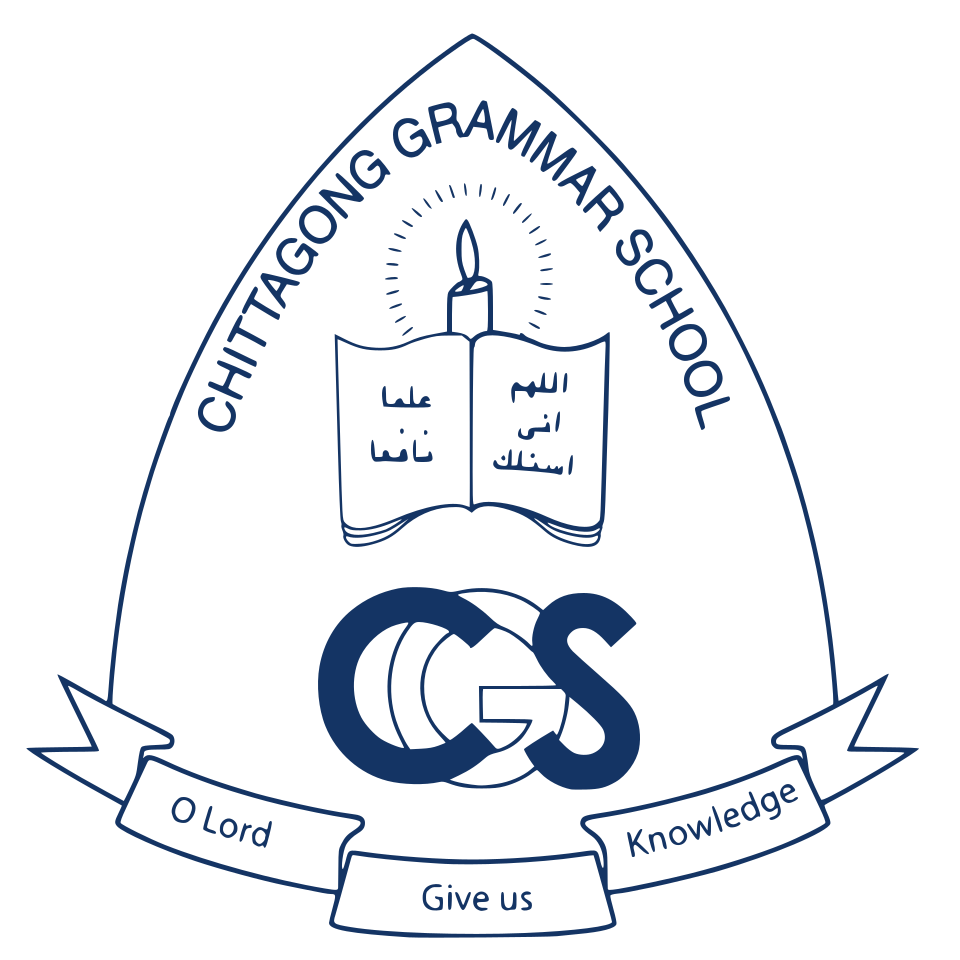

Location
- Chittagong; Bangladesh; 22.3597°N 91.8342°E

Information
- Motto: O Allah give me knowledge
- Established: 1992; 34 years ago
- Founders: Bilquis Dada, Farhat Khan and Shereen Ispahani
- Head teacher: Ruhbayna Mahmud Chowdhury (Upper School, College Section) Faiza Chowdhury (Upper School, School Section) Hector Fernandez (Middle School)
- Grades: Playgroup to Class 12
- Colors: Blue and White
- Website: cgs.edu.bd

Chittagong Grammar School (CGS) is an all-through school in Chittagong, Bangladesh but also has an establishment in Dhaka. The school is an associate member of Round Square Organization, driven by the philosophy of Kurt Hahn.

Initially an 'O' Level school, CGS introduced 'A' levels in 2004/2005. CIE results in 2006 were: 2% pass, (55% A/B) for 'A' Levels; 100% pass, (96% A/B) for 'O' Levels.

CGS is also a centre for the US College board examinations, SAT I & SAT II. It is also one of only twelve schools Bangladesh to be listed in the ISS (International Student Services) Directory of excellent International schools. In 2003 CGS was awarded 'International Fellowship Centre' status by Cambridge International Examinations.

== History ==
The Chittagong Grammar School (CGS) was founded in 1992, to satisfy the need for an international school in Chittagong.

A derelict building on Sarson Road was renovated and refurbished to house the school which opened in January 1993. There were only five classes - 5 to 9, 64 students and 14 teachers. Enrollment commenced in October/November 1992 and classes began on 12 January 1993.

The range of classes was expanded and by 1996 the entire range of classes (Playgroup to 'O' Levels) was being offered. Later the same year, the academic year of the school was changed from January - December to a September - June session.

In September 1996, CGS relocated and moved the Junior Section (Playgroup- Class 3) to its new premises.

In addition to Round Square, CGS is a member of several other international organizations, including a College Board Center (SAT tests), Duke of Edinburgh's Award Scheme (DOE), International School Services (ISS), Harvard University Model United Nations (MUN) and an international Fellowship Centre for Cambridge International Examinations (CIE).

== Curriculum ==
CGS follows a British school curriculum, with the exception of the CGS NC campus, which follows the national curriculum.

During the school year several field trips are conducted to complement the curriculum being taught in class.

== Extracurricular activities ==
The school has an extracurricular programmes including: aerobics, arts and crafts, badminton, basketball, chess, community service, cricket, dance, debating, drama, elocution, embroidery, environmental conservation, excursions/expeditions, fitness training, general knowledge instrumental music, karate, literary magazine, newspaper, photography, soccer, swimming, table tennis, taekwondo, track and field, vocal music, volleyball, yearbook, yoga. Clubs include Bengali Society, Book, Boy Scouts, Girl Guides, Nature society, Publishing, Science, Web Society and Young Readers.

== Sectors ==
- Lower School (Playgroup - Cl 2)
- Middle School (Cl 3 - Cl 8)
- Upper School (Cl 9 - Cl 12)

== Facilities ==
- Science labs (physics/chemistry/biology)
- I.T. labs with Internet connectivity
- Wi-Fi access points
- Libraries with over 10000 books
- 2 basketball and football courts (one at CGS NC)
- 2 badminton courts. One of them seats 75 spectators
- Cafeteria

== Subsidiaries ==
- CGS-NC (national curriculum)
- CGS-Upper School
- CGS-Middle School
- CGS-Lower School
- CGSD (Dhaka)
- CGSD-Elementary (Dhaka)
- CGSD-Primary Secondary (Dhaka)

== CGS Dhaka ==
In mid 2010, CGS opened their Dhaka branch in the city's Gulshan area. It is called Chittagong Grammar School-Dhaka (CGS-Dhaka).
