= Sunshine Grammar School and College =

Coordinates: 22.3643°N 91.8281°E

Sunshine Grammar School

Location
- Road # 1 House # 11; Nasirabad H/S, Chittagong, 4000; Bangladesh

Information
- Type: Cambridge International Examinations (CIE); Pearsons Edexcel
- Established: 1985
- Founder: Safia Ghazi Rahman
- Chairman: Safia Ghazi Rahman
- Principal: Sameer Ghazi Rahman
- Gender: Male&Female
- Age range: 2 – 18 years
- Colours: Navy blue & white
- Publication: Focus, La Sunshine, Sunshine Quarterly Newsletter
- Communities served: Sunshine Earth Club
- Website: sunshinegrammarschool.com

Sunshine Grammar School is a British curriculum school located in Chittagong, Bangladesh. The school provides lessons in Edexcel and Cambridge International Examinations for IGCSE and A Levels. It is the first British curriculum school in Chittagong, founded by Safia Ghazi Rahman, one of the most inspiring women in Bangladesh for her success in running schools and supporting various charities.

== History ==
Sunshine Grammar School was established in 1985. It was the first British Curriculum School in the port city of Chittagong, Bangladesh, offering IGCSE, Ordinary and Advanced Levels education under Britain's CIE and Pearsons Edexcel, UK.

The first batch of Sunshiners appeared for exams in 1987. Sunshine was one of the first Schools in Bangladesh to be allocated an 'examination centre' status in the country by a British Education Board.

Sunshine Grammar School is an international test centre for SAT examinations (Center Code # 74108). The school has also achieved recognition from Universities and Colleges Admissions Service (UCAS) as an international school and is closed centre for exams conducted by Admissions Testing Services (ATS) for entrance into undergraduate degrees in Cambridge and Oxford University.

== Subsidiaries ==
Chittagong Sunshine College, established in 1995, is the oldest English-medium National Curriculum based college under the Chittagong Education Board, Bangladesh.

Chittagong Sunshine School & College, is a leading English-medium National Curriculum based school established in 2005 with a 100% pass rate.

Little Steps Dhaka is the first foray of Sunshine Education outside of Chittagong. Little Steps specialises in day care and pre-play for toddlers and plans to start a kindergarten section in the near future.

== Admissions ==
The mode of admission is selective. Admissions are based on a preliminary written exam that tests English, maths and the sciences. Following satisfactory performance in the written test, the applicant undergoes a formal interview with the school authorities, who then make a final decision to offer a place to the student based on his/her academic, extracurricular and social skills. Approximately 15% of pupils are awarded a scholarship for excellence in academics and/or extracurricular activities.

== Facilities ==
- Auditorium and Theater Hall, which seats over 300 students
- Art Gallery
- Campus fully under Wi-Fi coverage with the objective of encouraging digital learning
- Air-Conditioners in all classrooms
- Projectors in senior section classrooms
- Interactive room for kids
- Bookstore
- Internationally accredited Computer Lab with over 25 PCs
- Indoor Sports Room consisting of Table Tennis, Chess, Darts, Carom and Foosball
- Karate Lessons
- Fully equipped Science Laboratory approved by The British Council to conduct Practical Examinations for A Levels (Official Examination Centre)
- University Counseling by full-time specialist
- Dedicated School Psychologist/Psychiatrist trained in Child & Adolescent Mental Health from the United Kingdom
- Member of DISA sporting events with active participation in sporting tournaments in Dhaka.

=== Activities ===
- Annual Programs such Award-giving ceremonies, Pohela Boishakh etc.
- Art Competitions
- Community Service
- Debate Club (competes in both National and Regional Championships)
- Spelling Bee (Active participants of Spelling Bee Tournament organised by The Daily Star News)
- Earth Club and environmental conservatism
- Sunshine Charities
- Free Friday Clinic
- Annual Inter-School (Athletics, Cricket, Football, Indoor Sports and so on)
- Karate Club
- Industrial Tours
- Business & Science Fair

=== Academic subjects ===
SGS offers the most comprehensive list of subjects offered by a Bangladeshi school for IGCSE, Ordinary and Advanced Level examinations from CIE & Pearsons Edexcel. The subjects are as follows:

- Accounting
- Applied Information and Communication Technology
- Art & Design
- Bangladesh Studies
- Bengali
- Biology
- Business Studies
- Chemistry
- Commerce
- Economics
- English Language
- English as a Second Language
- English Literature
- Geography
- Hindi
- Human Biology
- Information Technology (I.T.)
- Islamic Studies
- Mathematics A
- Mathematics B
- Mathematics D
- Additional Mathematics
- Pure Mathematics
- Physics
- Psychology
- Religious Studies
- Statistics
- Urdu

== Notable alumni ==
- Tamim Iqbal Khan - Captain of the Bangladesh National Cricket Team
- Irfan Shukkur - Member of Bangladesh A Cricket Team
- Nafees Iqbal - Bangladesh Cricket Team
