= CIDER International School =

- সাইডার ইন্টারন্যাশনাল স্কুল

Location
- Techno Cider International School Rd, Chattogram, Bangladesh; Chittagong; Bangladesh
- 22.3733°N 91.8125°E

Information
- Motto: Excellence is The Highest Goal of Human Endeavour
- Established: 1997
- Area trustee: Nader Khan, Rabiul Husain, Matiur Rahman, Parveen Mahmud, Md. Shamshul Alam, G. C. Tripathi
- Chairman: Mr. Nader Khan
- Director: G.C. Tripathi
- Principal: Neeti Tripathi
- Grades: Nursery to XII
- Enrollment: 3000 students
- Campus size: 4.5 acres
- Houses: Dragon; Unicorn; Phoenix; Griffin
- Website: https://cisbd.org/

CIDER International School is an English medium school in Chittagong, Bangladesh. It is Cambridge approved and one of the many schools in Chittagong that has Cambridge curriculum

== History ==
CIDER International School was established in 1997 by a group of social activists. It was initially to be part of a larger movement, the Chittagong Institute for Development of Education and Research (CIDER).

== Organisation ==
CIDER conducts its academic activities on its own campus on six acres of land. The school is coeducational, with approximately 1000 students playing sports.

== Curriculum ==
The institution offers two curricula: the British curriculum, under Cambridge International Examinations, and the English-language version of the national curriculum.

== Affiliations ==
CIDER is affiliated with the University of Cambridge International Examinations. It is also affiliated with Board of Intermediate and Secondary Education, Chittagong which endorses the National Curriculum in its streams.

== Achievements ==
The school won the national 2008 Aktel Debate Championship for English medium schools. In 2016, Mayisha Mahdiya Sultana of Cider achieved the highest grades in O and A level exams in the entire Bangladesh to date. Following her studies at CIDER, she attended Princeton University and the University of Oxford. Notable alumni also includes Dr. Yamin Bin Baqui and Dr. Yasir Bin Baqui who completed their PhD from the University of Cambridge on aerospace engineering. Prior to that, they had also studied at MIT, Harvard and NUS.
