= K–16 (education movement) =

American education movement to merge tertiary and pre-tertiary education

K–16 is a movement in the United States to bring together the various levels of education for younger students, namely between the K–12 and the post-secondary education systems, and create aligned policy and practice in examination practices, graduation requirements, admissions policies and other areas. The movement is so-named because of an insinuated continuum between the traditionally-distinct K–12 system and the two-to-four-year basic post-secondary education system that is in place in most colleges and universities (hence "13th grade", "14th grade", "15th grade" and "16th grade"). Community colleges with associate degrees are equal to grades 13 to 14. Universities offer grades 14 to 16 with a bachelor's degree. Master university degrees would then be grades 17 to 18. Doctorate degrees offer 19-21st grade.
