= Katra =

Katra means caravanserai (roadside inn) in Arabic and Persian.

Katra may also refer to:

== Places ==
=== Bangladesh ===
- Katra (Dhaka), caravanserai inns in Bengal
  - Bara Katra ("greater katra"), a historical katra in Dhaka
  - Chhota Katra ("lesser katra"), a historical katra in Dhaka

=== India ===
- Katras, a town in Jharkhand, India
- Katra, Jammu and Kashmir or Vaishno Devi, a small town in Jammu and Kashmir
- Katra, Allahabad, a locality/township in Uttar Pradesh
- Katra, Gonda, a town and a nagar panchayat in Uttar Pradesh
- Katra Gulab Singh, a town and regional market in Uttar Pradesh
- Katra Medniganj, a town and a nagar panchayat in Uttar Pradesh
- Katra, Shahjahanpur, a town and a nagar panchayat in Uttar Pradesh
- Katra Masjid, a mosque and tomb in Murshidabad, West Bengal

=== Iran ===
- Katra, Iran, a city in Fars Province, also known by several other names including Korehi
- Katra, Mazandaran, a village in Mazandaran Province
- Katra Rural District, an administrative subdivision of Mazandaran Province

=== Lithuania ===
- Katra, Lithuania, a village in Alytus County
- Katra or Kotra, a river along the Belarus–Lithuania border

== People ==
- Katra Solopuro (born 1984), Finnish vocalist and founder of the band Katra
- Katra Zajc (born 1967), Slovenian alpine skier

== Other uses ==
- Katra (band), a Finnish symphonic metal band
- Katra (Star Trek), the Vulcan word for a person's soul or spirit
- Katra Bazar Assembly constituency, a constituency of the Uttar Pradesh Legislative Assembly in India
- Shri Mata Vaishno Devi Katra railway station, on the Jammu Udhampur Srinagar Baramulla Railway Link in India

== See also ==
- Catra, a fictional character in the Masters of the Universe franchise
- Katradevi, a village in Rajapur taluka in India
- Katras, a neighbourhood in Dhanbad City in India
- Khatra (disambiguation), various uses
