= Caravanserai =

Type of roadside inn

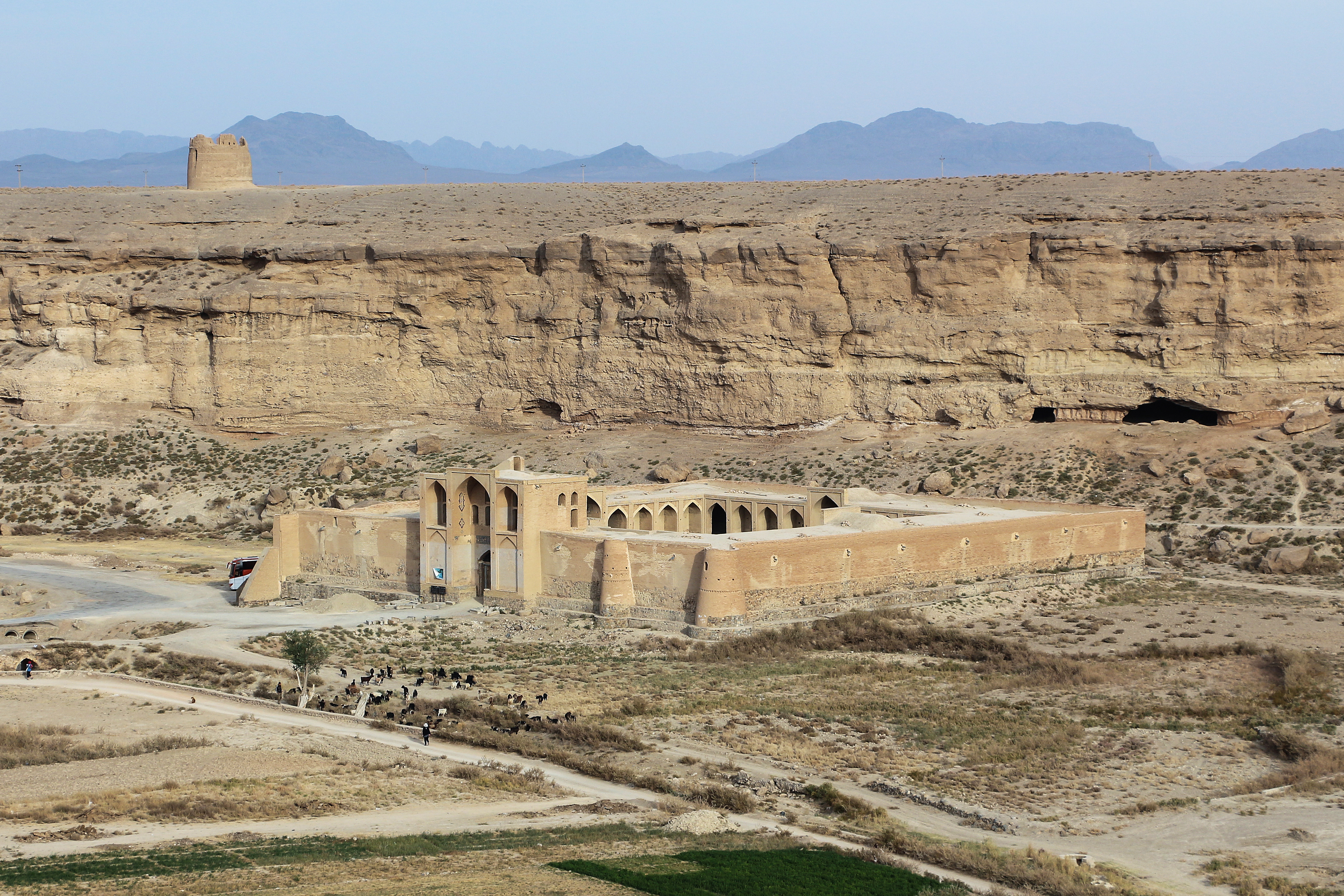
The Izadkhast caravanserai (early 17th century), Fars province, Iran

A caravanserai (/ˌkærəˈvænsəraɪ/ KARR-ə-VAN-sər-eye) or caravansary (/ˌkærəˈvænsəri/ KARR-ə-VAN-sər-ee) was an inn that provided lodging for travelers, merchants, and caravans. They were present throughout much of the Islamic world. Depending on the region and period, they were called by a variety of names including khan, funduq and wikala. Caravanserais supported the flow of commerce, information, and people across the network of trade routes covering Asia, North Africa and Southeast Europe, most notably the Silk Road. In the countryside, they were typically built at intervals equivalent to a day's journey along important roads, where they served as a kind of staging post. Urban versions of caravanserais were historically common in cities, where they could serve as inns, depots, and venues for conducting business.

The buildings were most commonly rectangular structures with one protected entrance. Inside, a central courtyard was surrounded by an array of rooms on one or more levels. In addition to lodgings for people, they often included space to accommodate horses, camels, and other pack animals, as well as storage rooms for merchandise.

== Terms and etymology ==
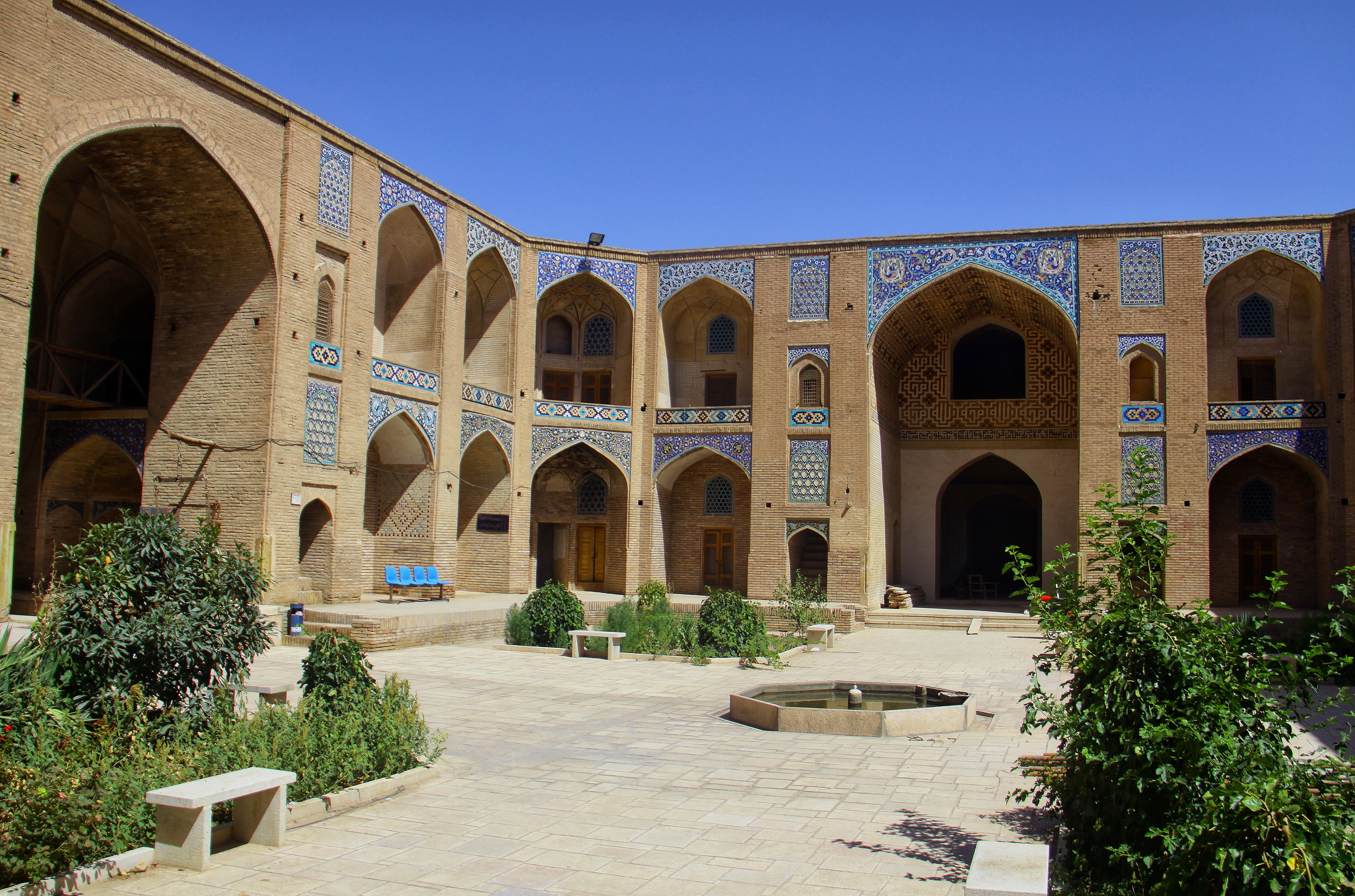
The Ganjali Khan Caravanserai (1598), in Kerman, Iran

=== Caravanserai ===
Caravanserai (Persian: کاروانسرای, romanized: kārvānsarāy), is the Persian compound word variant combining kārvān "caravan" with -sarāy "palace", "building with enclosed courts". Here "caravan" means a group of traders, pilgrims, and travelers, engaged in long-distance travel. The word is also rendered as caravansary, caravansaray, caravanseray, caravansara, and caravansarai. In scholarly sources, it is often used as an umbrella term for multiple related types of commercial buildings similar to inns or hostels, whereas the actual instances of such buildings had a variety of names depending on the region and the local language. However, the term was typically preferred for rural inns built along roads outside of city walls. Serai shares the same etymology as seraglio, an administrative building with a courtyard.

=== Khan ===
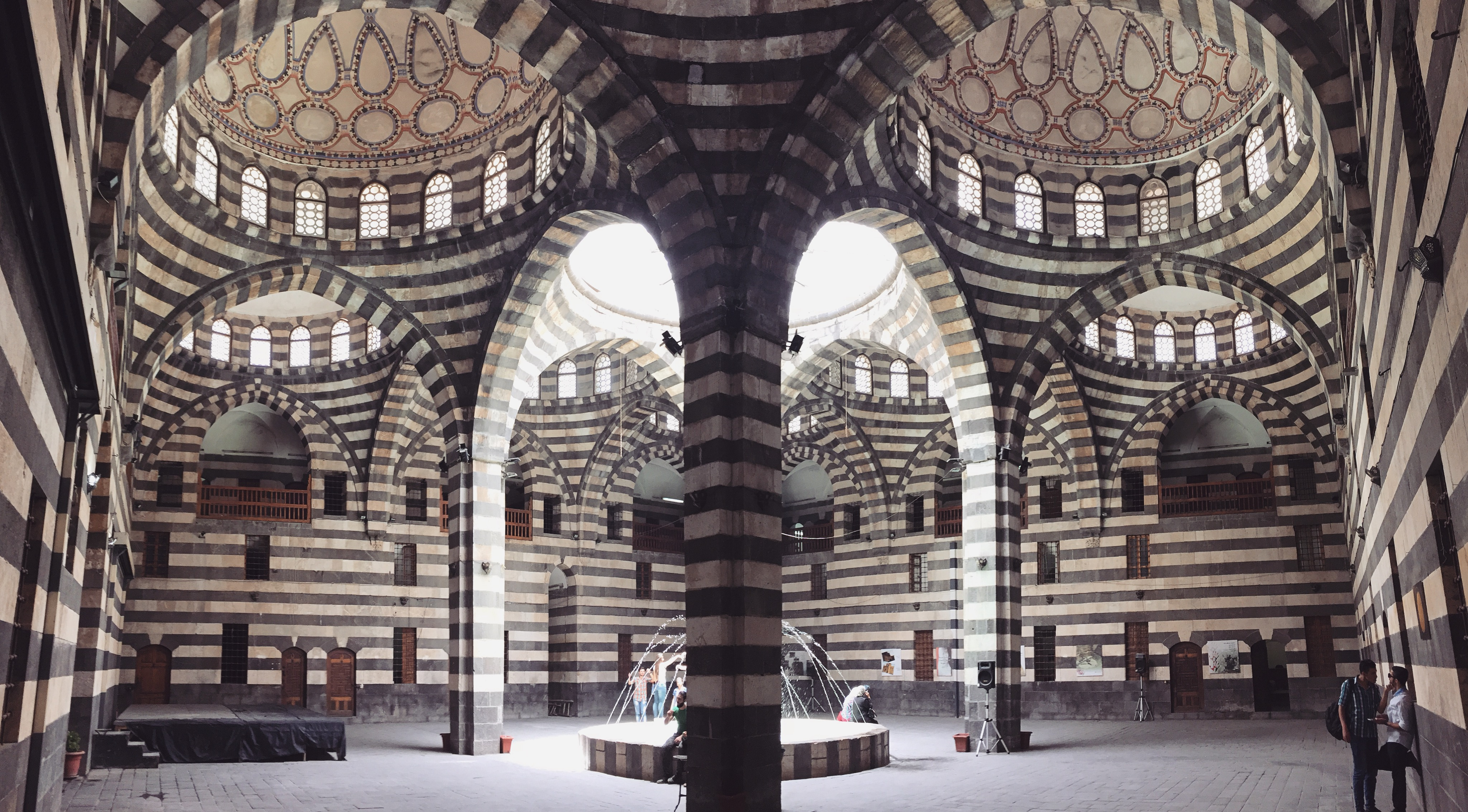
Khan As'ad Pasha, a caravanserai built in 1752 in Damascus, Syria

The word khan (خان) derives from a clipping of Middle Persian: 𐭡𐭩𐭲𐭠, romanized: xānag, lit. 'house'. It could refer to an urban caravanserai built within a town or a city or to any caravanserai in general, including those built in the countryside and along desert routes. It came into more common usage under the Mamluk Sultanate and the Ottoman Empire.

From Persian, the word passed into common usage in Arabic (Arabic: خان) and Turkish (Turkish: han). Examples of such buildings are found throughout the Middle East from as early as the Umayyad Caliphate. The same word was used in Bosnian, Albanian, Romanian and Bulgarian, having arrived through the Ottoman conquest.

=== Funduq ===
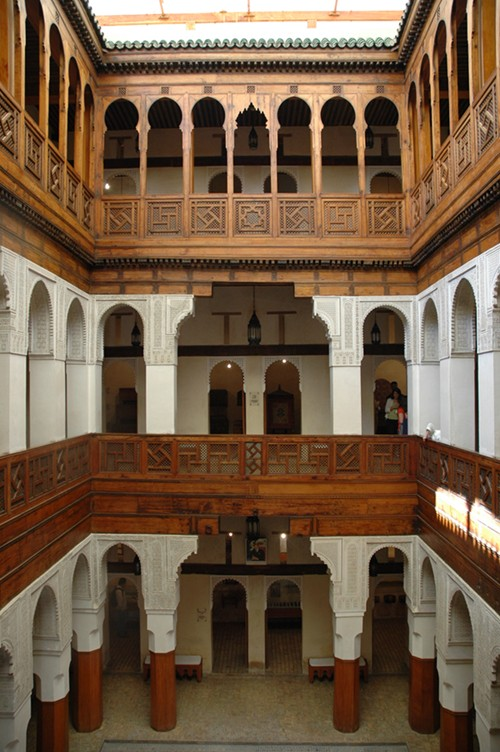
Funduq al-Najjarin in Fes, Morocco

The term funduq (Arabic: فندق; sometimes spelled foundouk or fondouk from the French transliteration) is frequently used for historic inns around the Maghreb, particularly those in the cities.

The word comes from Koine Greek: πανδοκεῖον, romanized: welcoming all; an inn; it appears as fundaco in Venice, fondaco in Genoa, and alhóndiga or fonda in Spanish. In the cities of this region such buildings were also frequently used as housing for artisan workshops. The word became the common Arabic word for Hotel.

=== Wikala ===
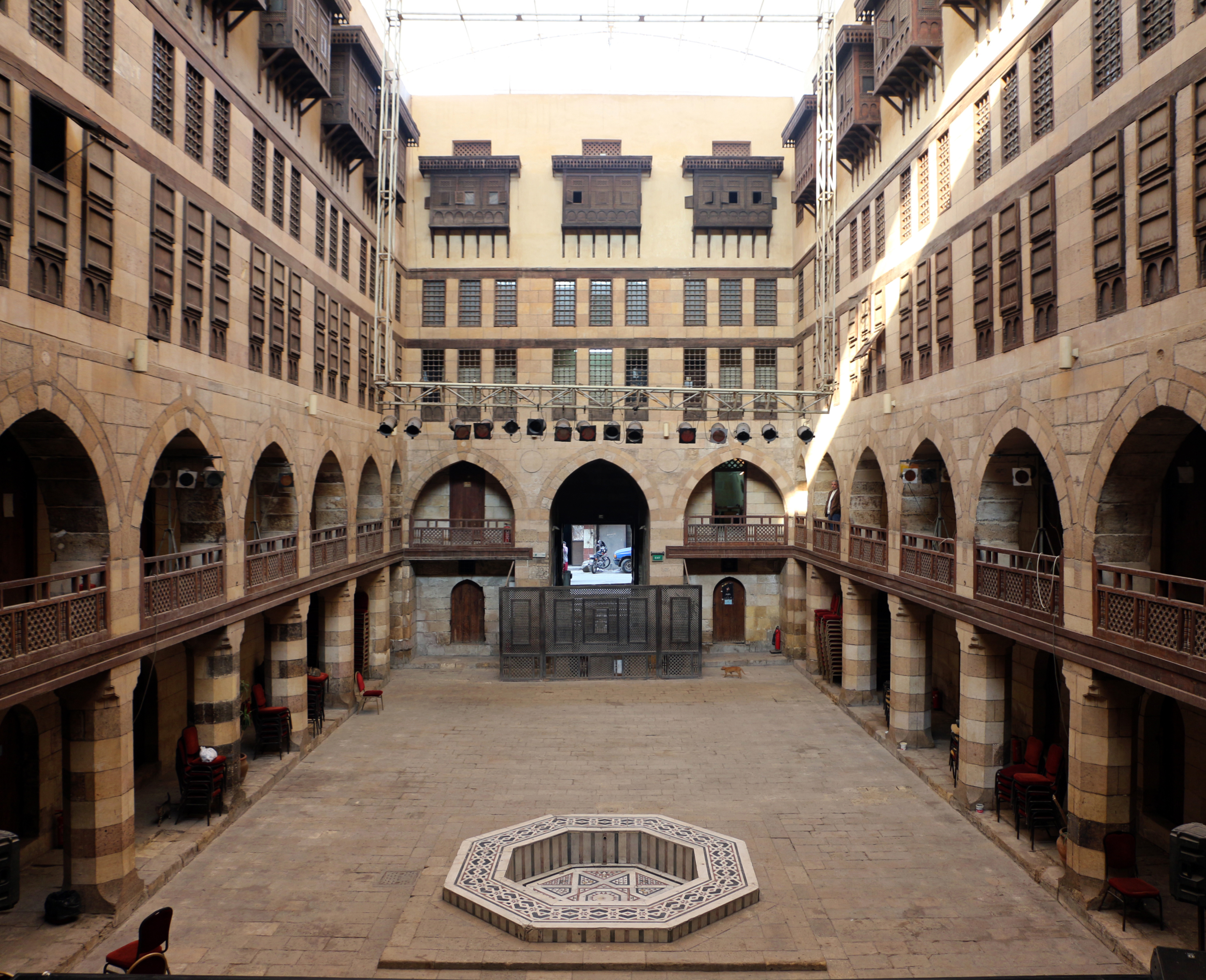
The Wikala of Sultan al-Ghuri (1504–05), one of the best-preserved examples in Cairo

The Arabic word wikala (وكالة), sometimes spelled wakala or wekala, is a term used in Egypt for an urban caravanserai which housed merchants and their goods and served as a center for trade, storage, transactions and other commercial activity. The word wikala means roughly "agency" in Arabic, in this case a commercial agency, which may also have been a reference to the customs offices that could be located here to deal with imported goods. The term khan was also frequently used for this type of building in Egypt.

==== Okelle ====
The term okelle or okalle, the Italianized rendering of the Arabic word wikala, is used for a type of large urban buildings in 19th century Egypt, specifically in Alexandria. Here, the older Egyptian wikala was reinterpreted in an Italianate style by the Italian architect Francesco Mancini. Directed by Muhammad Ali, he designed and built a number of okelles delineating the Place des Consuls (the main square of Alexandria's European quarter), which served as consular mansions, a European-style hotel, and a stock exchange, among other functions.

=== Katra ===
Kāṭrā (Bengali: কাটরা) is the name given to the caravanserais built by the Mughal Empire in Bengal. The Bara Katra (Bengali: বড় কাটরা, romanized: Baṛa Kāṭrā, lit. 'Great Caravanserai') and Chhota Katra (Bengali: ছোট কাটরা, romanized: Chōṭa kāṭrā, lit. 'Small Caravanserai') refers to two magnificent Mughal katras in Dhaka, Bangladesh.

== History ==
The origin of rural caravanserais are ancient. One early antecedent has been found in the remains of an Urartian site from the 8th or 9th century BCE uncovered in western Iran, near the mountain pass between Urmia and Oshnavieh. The Achaemenid Empire (6th to 4th centuries BCE) built staging posts or relay stations for communications along its major roads. Herodotus reports that they existed along the Achaemenid Empire's Royal Road, a 2,500-kilometre-long (1,600 mi) ancient highway that stretched from Sardis to Susa. He writes: "Now the true account of the road in question is the following: Royal stations exist along its whole length, and excellent caravanserais; and throughout, it traverses an inhabited tract, and is free from danger." The later Byzantine Empire also maintained staging posts along its major roads. None of these ancient caravanserais have been preserved and therefore not much is known of their appearance.

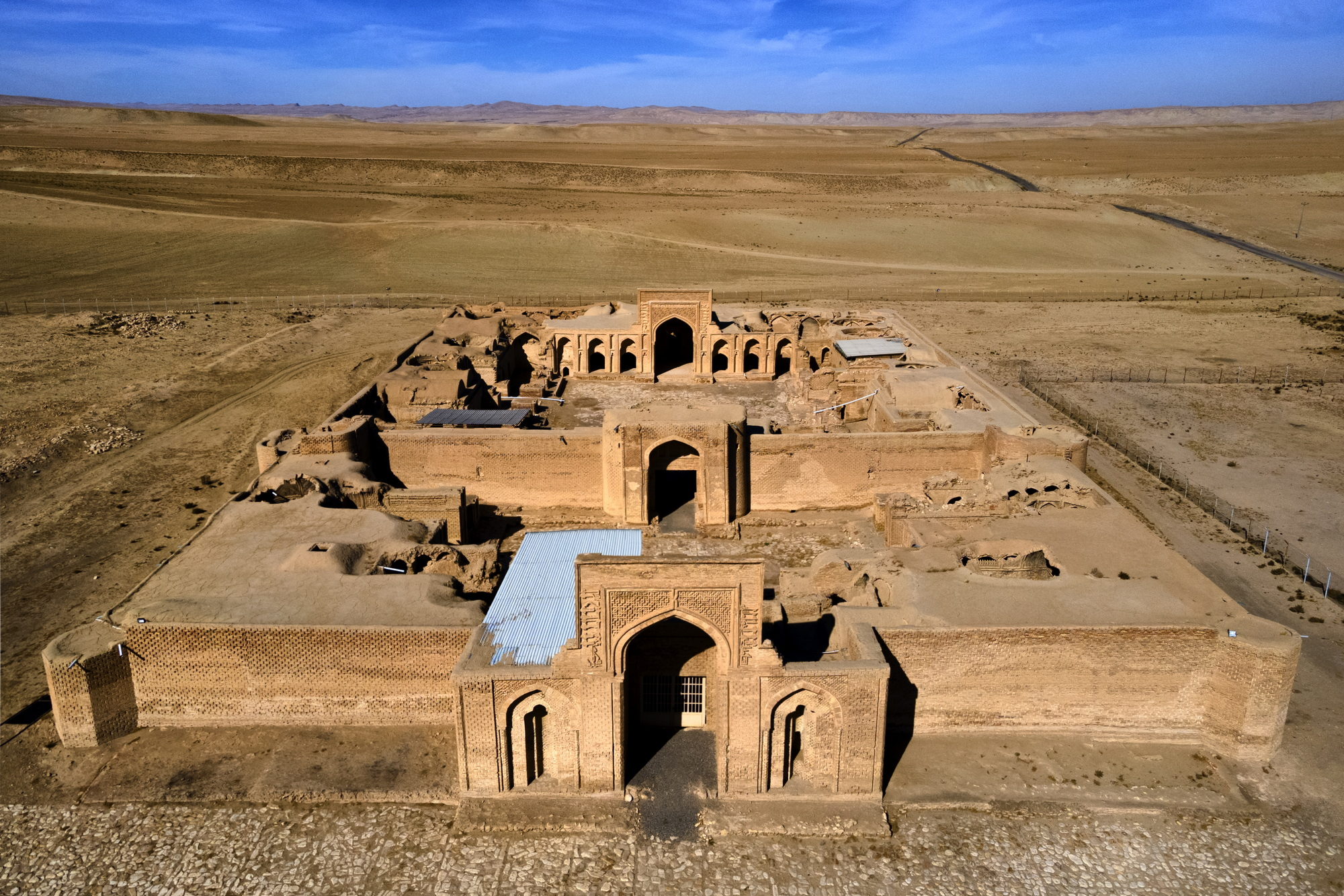
Ribat-i Sharaf in Iran, built by the Great Seljuks in the 12th century

In the Islamic period (seventh century and after), the use of caravanserais intensified. Their development at this time is linked to the shift from wheeled vehicles to camels and caravans for long-distance travel. Caravanserais were a common type of structure both in the rural countryside and in dense urban centers across the Middle East, North Africa, and Ottoman Europe. The oldest identified example of an Islamic caravanserai is a courtyard structure at Qasr al-Hayr al-Sharqi, an Umayyad complex from the early 8th century located in the middle of the desert in present-day Syria.

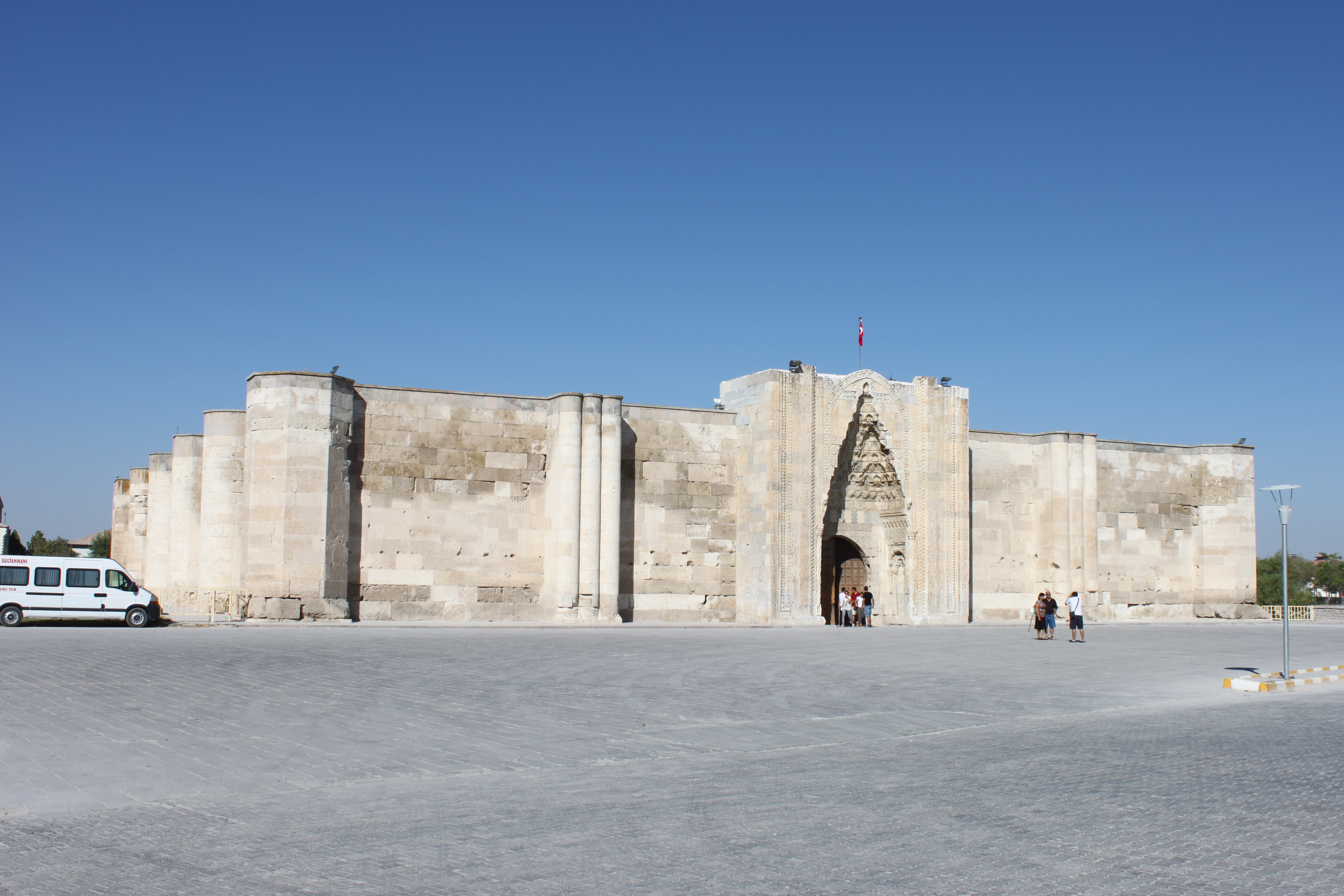
Sultan Han, built by the Anatolian Seljuks in the 13th century near Aksaray, Turkey

A number of 12th to 13th-century rural caravanserais were built throughout the Seljuk Empire and its offshoots, many examples of which have survived across Iran (e.g. the Ribat-i Sharaf in Khorasan province), Central Asia (e.g. Ribat-i Malik in Uzbekistan) and Turkey (e.g. the large Sultan Han in Aksaray Province). They continued to be built under successor dynasties, although few notable examples have survived from the Ayyubid and Mamluk periods in the Middle East. Under the later Safavids in Iran, as the economy of the region improved, their construction increased to encourage international trade, particularly on the trade routes to India. Shah Abbas I (r. 1587–1629), in particular, built them as part of his improvements to communications and commercial infrastructure.

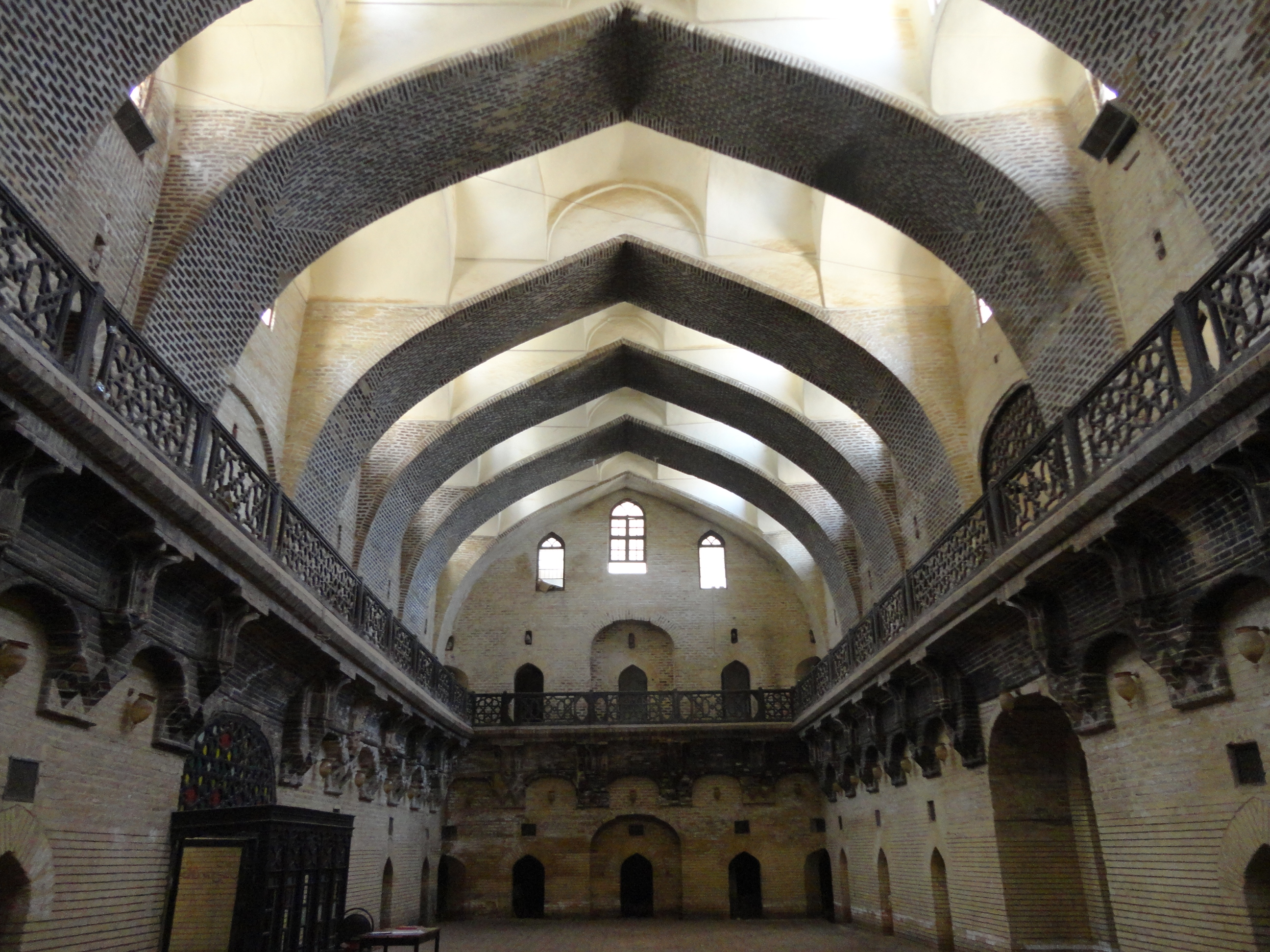
Khan al-Mirjan in Baghdad, dated to 1359, the oldest surviving urban caravanserai

Urban versions of caravanserais also became important centers of economic activity in cities across the Muslim world, often concentrated near the main bazaar areas, with many examples still standing in the historic areas of Damascus, Aleppo, Cairo, Istanbul, Fes, etc. The oldest urban caravanserai to have survived to the present day is the Khan al-Mirjan in Baghdad, which dates from 1359. The commercial prosperity of the Levant during the late Middle Ages led to the proliferation of numerous caravanserais in the heart of major Syrian cities and of Cairo in Egypt. Other caravanserais were also built in the center of major cities in Safavid Iran and in the Ottoman Empire.

In the Indian subcontinent, caravanserais are found along the historic trade route known as the Grand Trunk Road. The oldest clear mention of a caravanserai in historical documents is the one commissioned by Muhammad ibn Tughluq, the Sultan of Delhi (r. 1324–1351), which was built between Delhi and Daulatabad. They grew in number during the rule of Sher Shah Suri (r. 1486–1545). Under the Mughals, the sultans commissioned the construction of further caravanserais and encouraged their entourage to do the same, mainly from the 16th to late 18th centuries. Their concept and designs were adapted from Iranian examples.

== Function ==
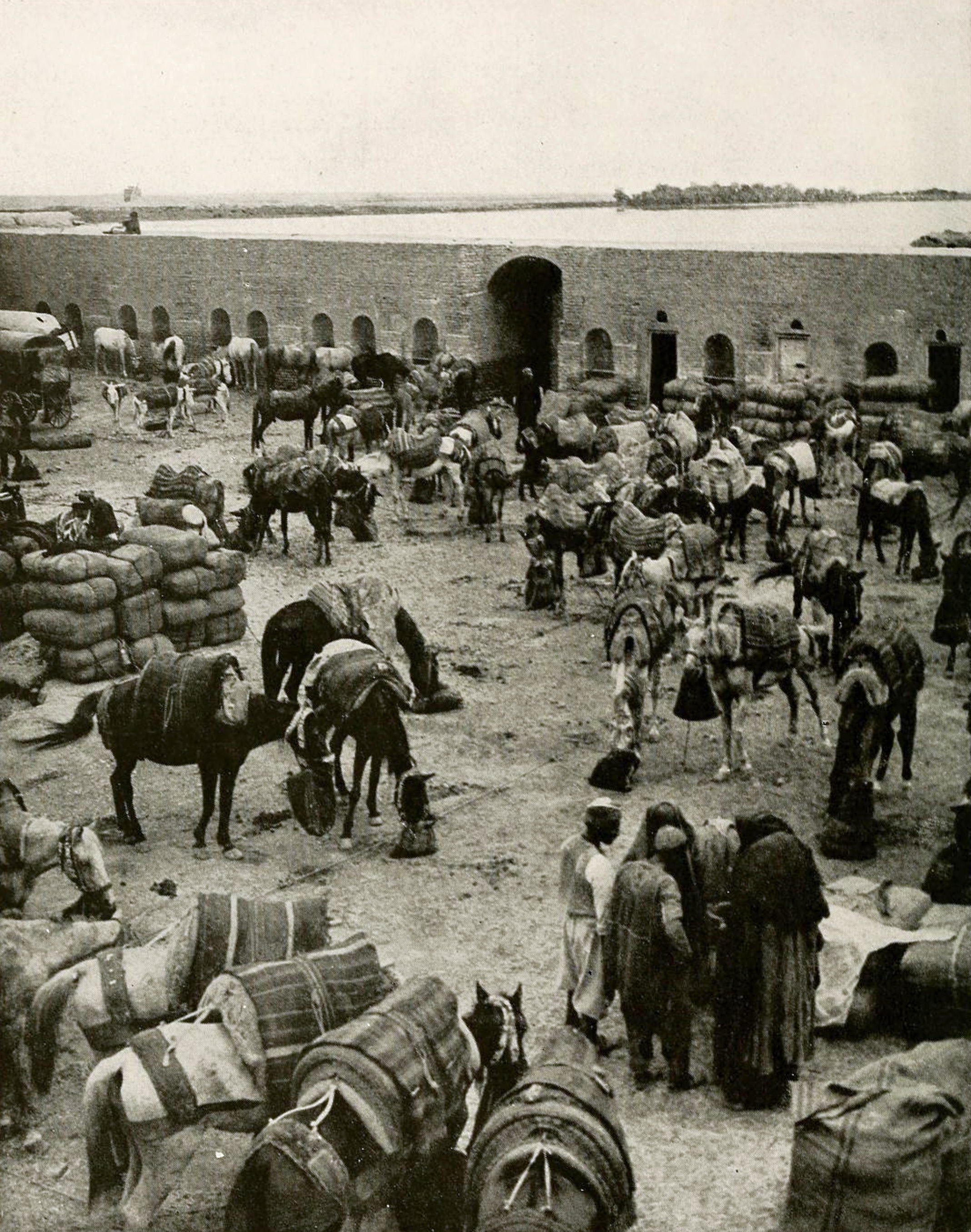
Fallujah's Caravanserai in use, ca. 1914, Iraq

Caravanserais served a variety of functions supporting trade and commerce. Rural caravanserais were built at intervals along major roads. They served as way stations where merchants and travelers could safely stop and rest along the way. The distance between them was intended to be equivalent to a day's journey. In Iran, this typically amounted to a distance of 30 to 40 kilometres (19 to 25 mi) in open landscapes (like deserts and plains) or about 10 kilometres (6 mi) or less in more difficult mountainous terrain.

Urban versions of caravanserais were commonly built in the hearts of major cities. They provided lodging for merchants, in particular for foreign merchants who needed a place to stay when doing business in the city. They also served as depots for their merchandise and as venues for conducting transactions. In addition to accommodation and storage, caravanserais could include other amenities such as a hammam (bathhouse) and a prayer room or mosque.

Ibn Battuta, a 14th-century Muslim traveler, described the function of a caravanserai in the region of China:

China is the safest and best country for the traveller. A man travels for nine months alone with great wealth and has nothing to fear. What is responsible for this is that in every post station in their country is funduq which has a director living there with a company of horse and foot. After sunset or nightfall the director comes to the funduq with his secretary and writes down the names of all the travellers who will pass the night there, seals it and locks the door of the funduq. In the morning he and his secretary come and call everybody by name and write down a record. He sends someone with the travellers to conduct them to the next post station and he brings back a certificate from the director of the funduq confirming that they have all arrived. If he does not do this he is answerable for them. This is the procedure in every post station in their country from Sin al-Sin to Khan Baliq. In them is everything the traveller needs by way of provisions, especially hens and geese. Sheep are rare among them.

— Ibn Battuta

In many parts of the Muslim world, caravanserais also provided revenues that were used to fund charitable or religious functions or buildings. This was characteristic of urban caravanserais. These revenues and functions were managed through a waqf, a protected agreement which gave certain buildings and revenues the status of mortmain endowments guaranteed under Islamic law. Many major religious complexes in the Ottoman and Mamluk empires, for example, either included a caravanserai building (like in the külliye of the Süleymaniye Mosque in Istanbul) or drew revenues from one in the area (such as the Wikala al-Ghuri in Cairo, which was built to contribute revenues for the nearby complex of Sultan al-Ghuri).

== Architecture ==
=== General ===
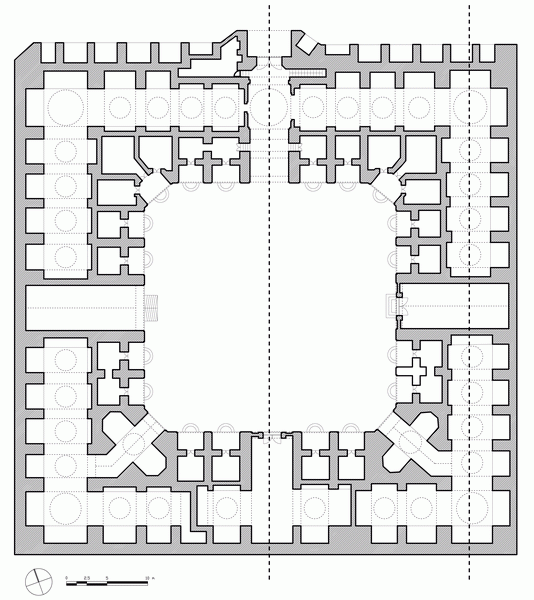
A sample floor plan of a Safavid Empire-era caravanserai in Karaj, Iran

Typically, a caravanserai was a building with a square or rectangular floor plan, with a single entrance wide enough to permit large or heavily laden beasts such as camels to enter. It had a central courtyard, almost always open to the sky, which was surrounded by a number of identical animal stalls, bays, and chambers to accommodate merchants and their servants, animals, and merchandise.

Caravanserais provided water for human and animal consumption as well as for washing and ritual purification (wudu and ghusl), provided by a fountain or well in the courtyard and sometimes by attached public baths (hammams). They kept fodder for animals and had shops for travellers where they could acquire new supplies. Some shops bought goods from the travelling merchants. Many caravanserais were equipped with small mosques, such as the elevated prayer rooms in the center of Seljuk and Ottoman caravanserais in Turkey.

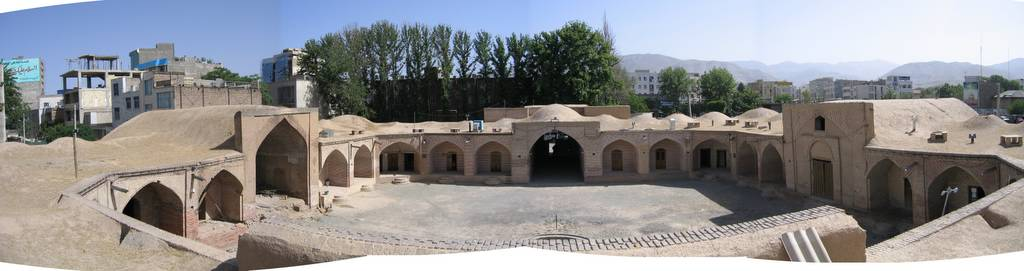
View of a typical courtyard layout in the Shah-Abbasi caravansarai in Karaj, Iran

=== Variations ===
Building techniques and decoration varied depending on the region and period. Rural caravanserais of the Seljuk period in Iran and Central Asia, such as the Ribat-i Sharaf and Ribat-i Malik, were built in brick and are known for their monumental exterior façades with decorative brickwork. The rural caravanserais of Seljuk Anatolia could include, in addition to (or sometimes instead of) a courtyard, a roofed section consisting of a vaulted hall with side chambers. Built of stone rather than brick, Anatolian caravanserais are also notable for their tall and elaborately carved entrance portals.

The urban caravanserais of the Levant, from the late Middle Ages onward, were of typical layout but built with local decoration such as ablaq masonry and carved stone details. Their street façades often had alcoves for hosting shops. Some were quite large and formed part of a larger complex of amenities, as in the Khan al-Jumruk in Aleppo. In Cairo, starting in the Burji Mamluk period, wikalas were frequently several stories tall and often included a rab', a low-income rental apartment complex, that was situated on the upper floors while the merchant accommodations occupied the lower floors. This made the best use of limited space in a crowded city and provided the building with two sources of revenue that were managed through the waqf system.

The later Ottomans continued to build caravanserais but their patronage was focused on urban centres, where they were built alongside other commercial structures such as arastas (market streets) and bedestens (central market halls) in the middle of the city. The caravanserais themselves consist of courtyards surrounded by two or more levels of domed rooms fronted by arcaded galleries.

In Safavid Iran, caravanserais had a standard layout for the most part: a rectangular courtyard surrounded by a gallery of vaulted openings (iwans) and rooms on one or two levels. At the middle of each of side was a larger central iwan, repeating the four-iwan plan common in Iranian architecture. Rural caravanserais often had rounded towers at their corners and an imposing entrance portal. In the later Safavid period (17th century), more complex layouts appeared, such as those with an octagonal floor plan instead of rectangular. In the Indian subcontinent, caravanserais were drawn from Iranian designs but adapted to local needs. They usually had a symmetrical floor plan with two major gateways. A mosque, often consisting of a three-domed hall, was commonly built into the west side of the building.

In the far west of the Islamic world, comprising present-day Morocco and Spain, urban caravanserais were multi-story buildings with a central courtyard. Though they could have elaborate entrance portals and ornate wooden ceilings in their vestibules, the interior could be relatively austere.

Examples of caravanserai architecture

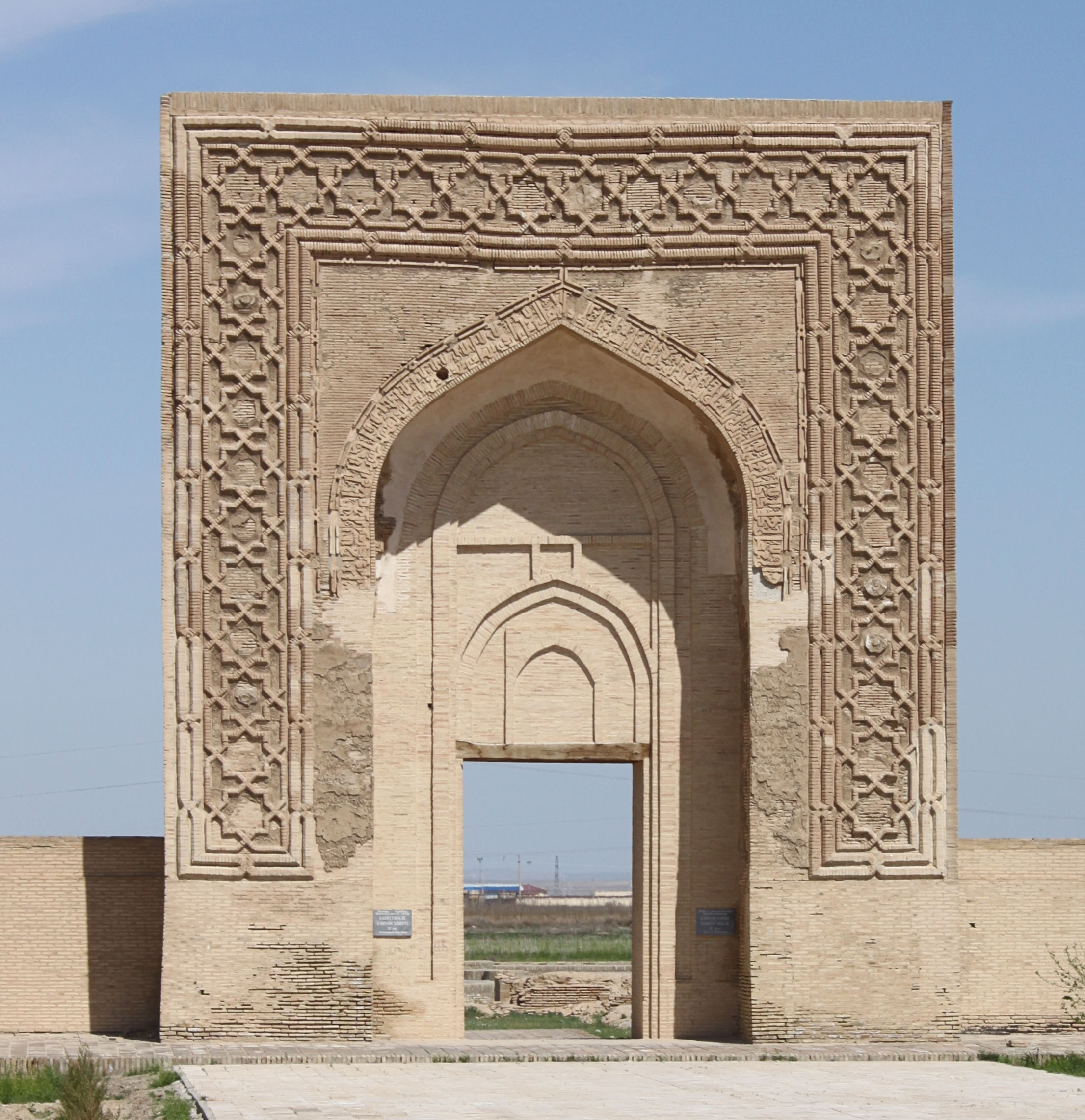
Gateway of Ribat-i Malik in Uzbekistan (c. 1068–1080, Great Seljuk period)

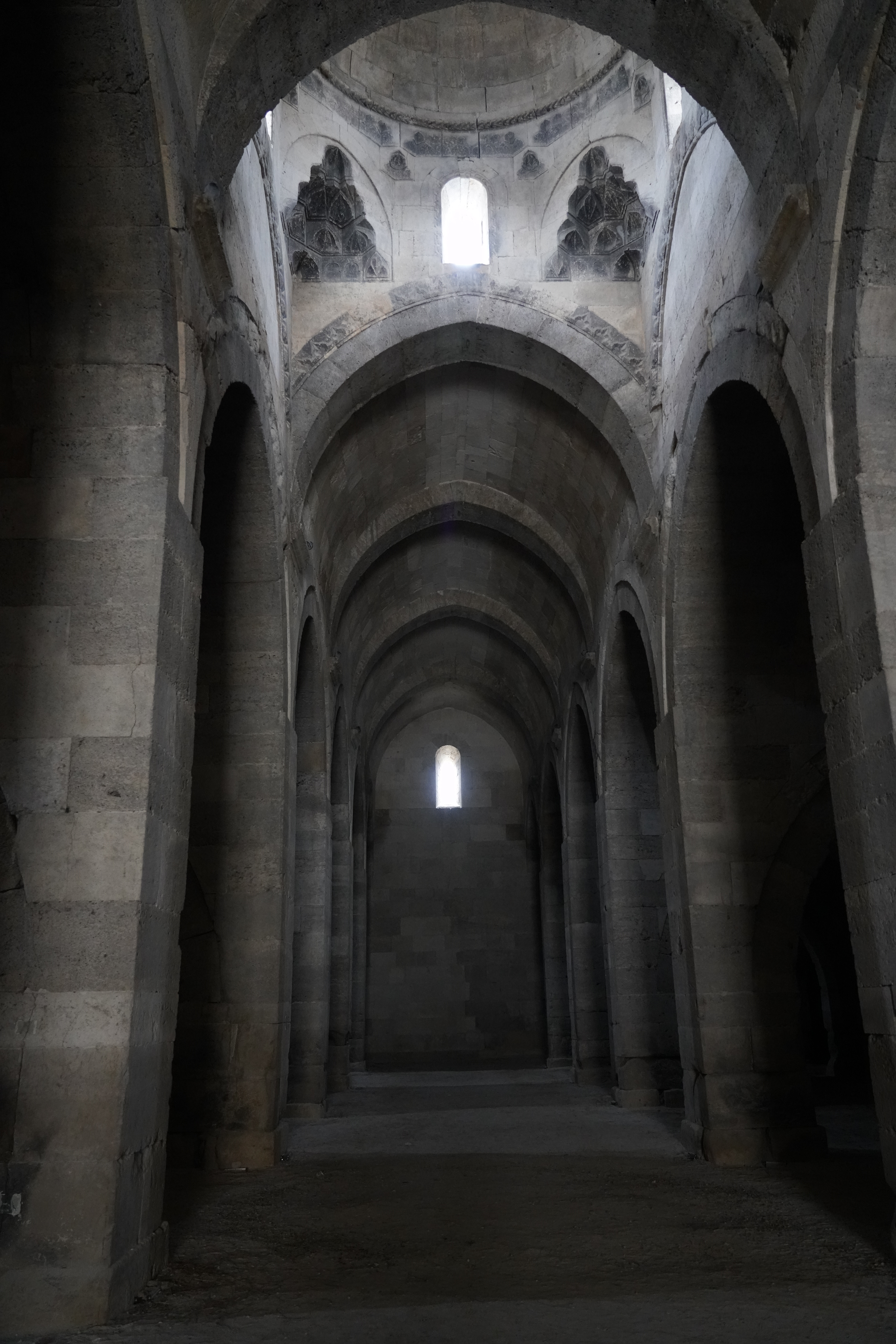
Roofed hall attached to the Sultan Han near Aksaray, Turkey (13th century), a feature of some Anatolian Seljuk caravanserais

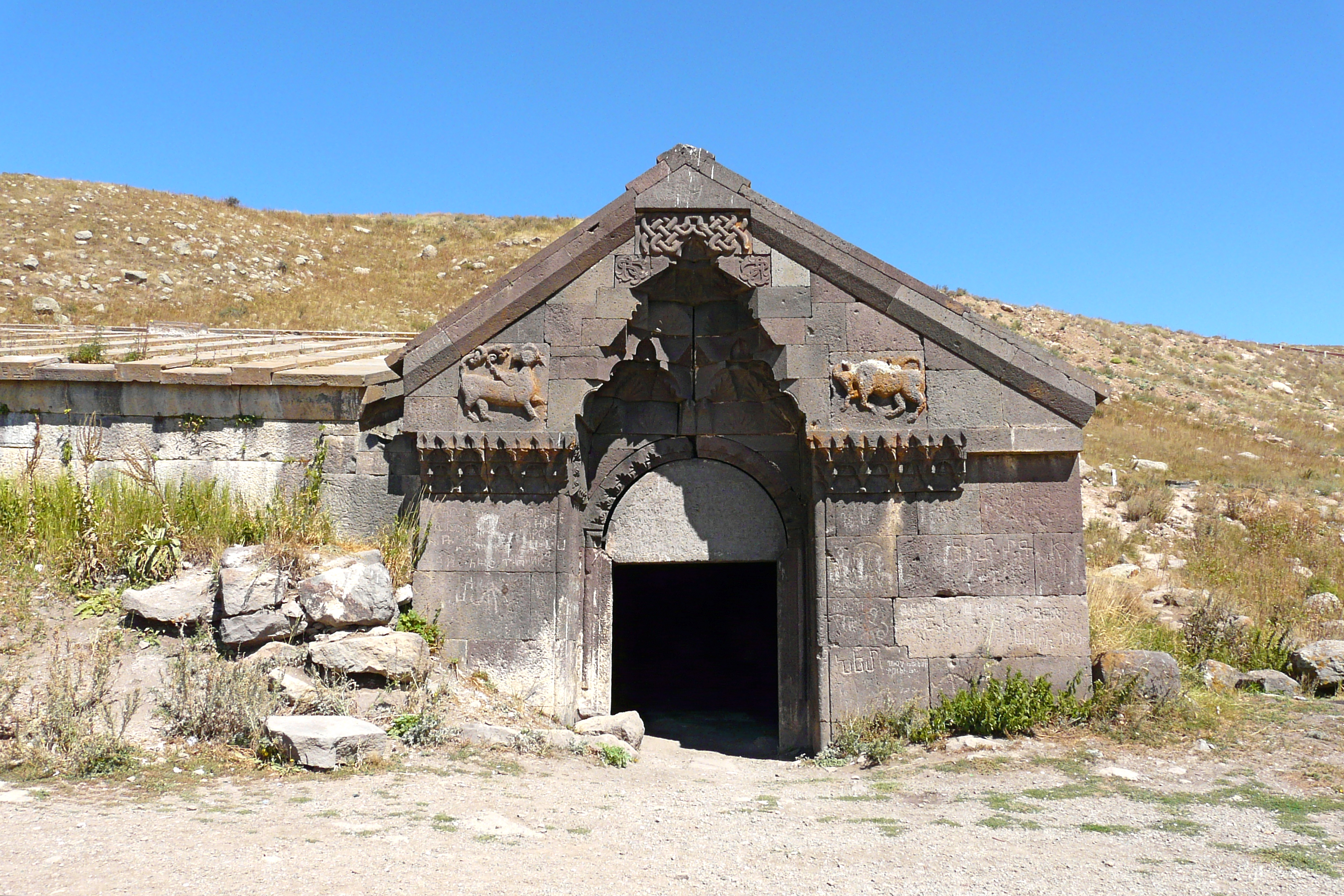
Entrance of Orbelian's Caravanserai in Armenia (1332)

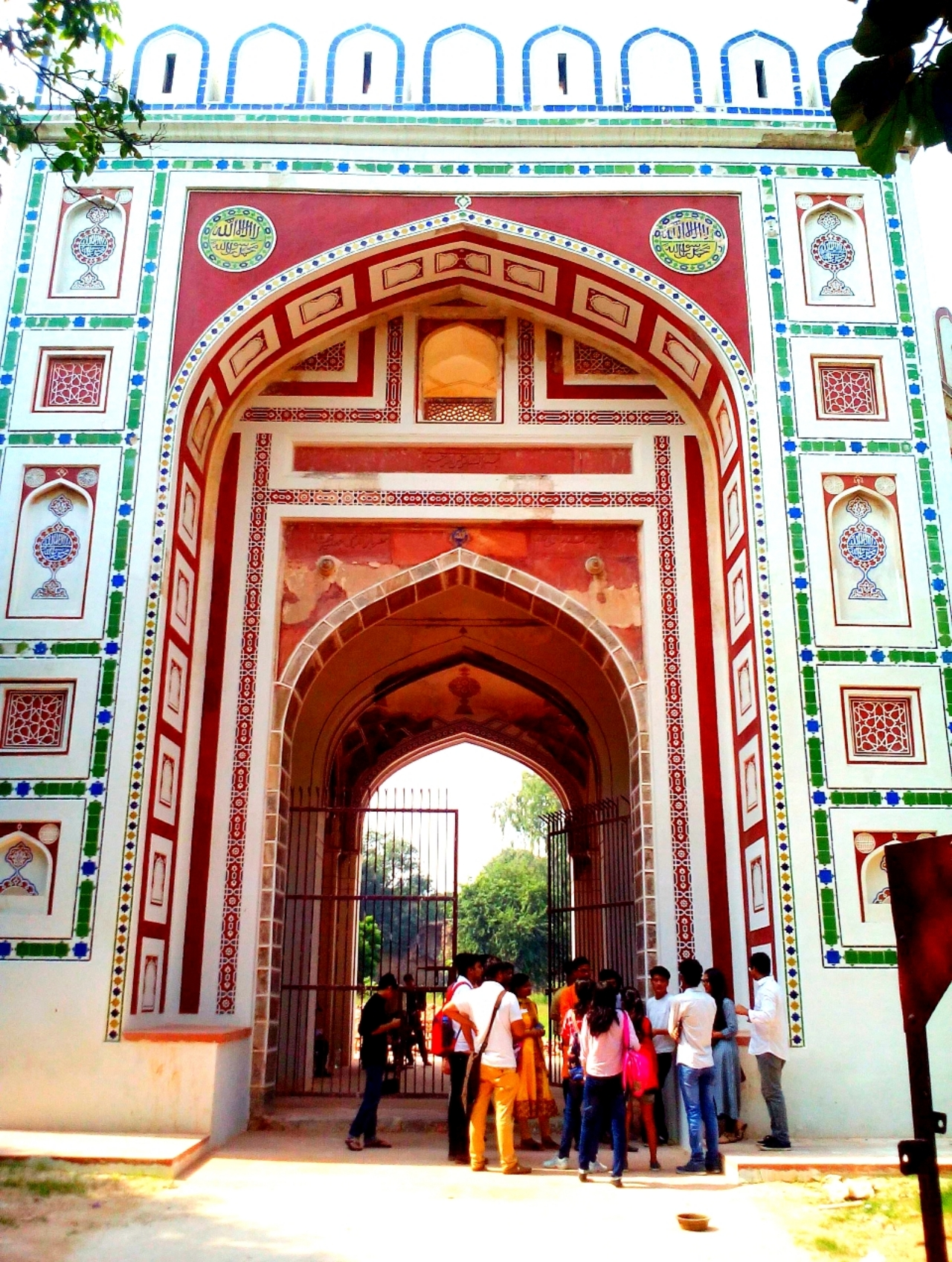
Arab Serai gate in Delhi, India

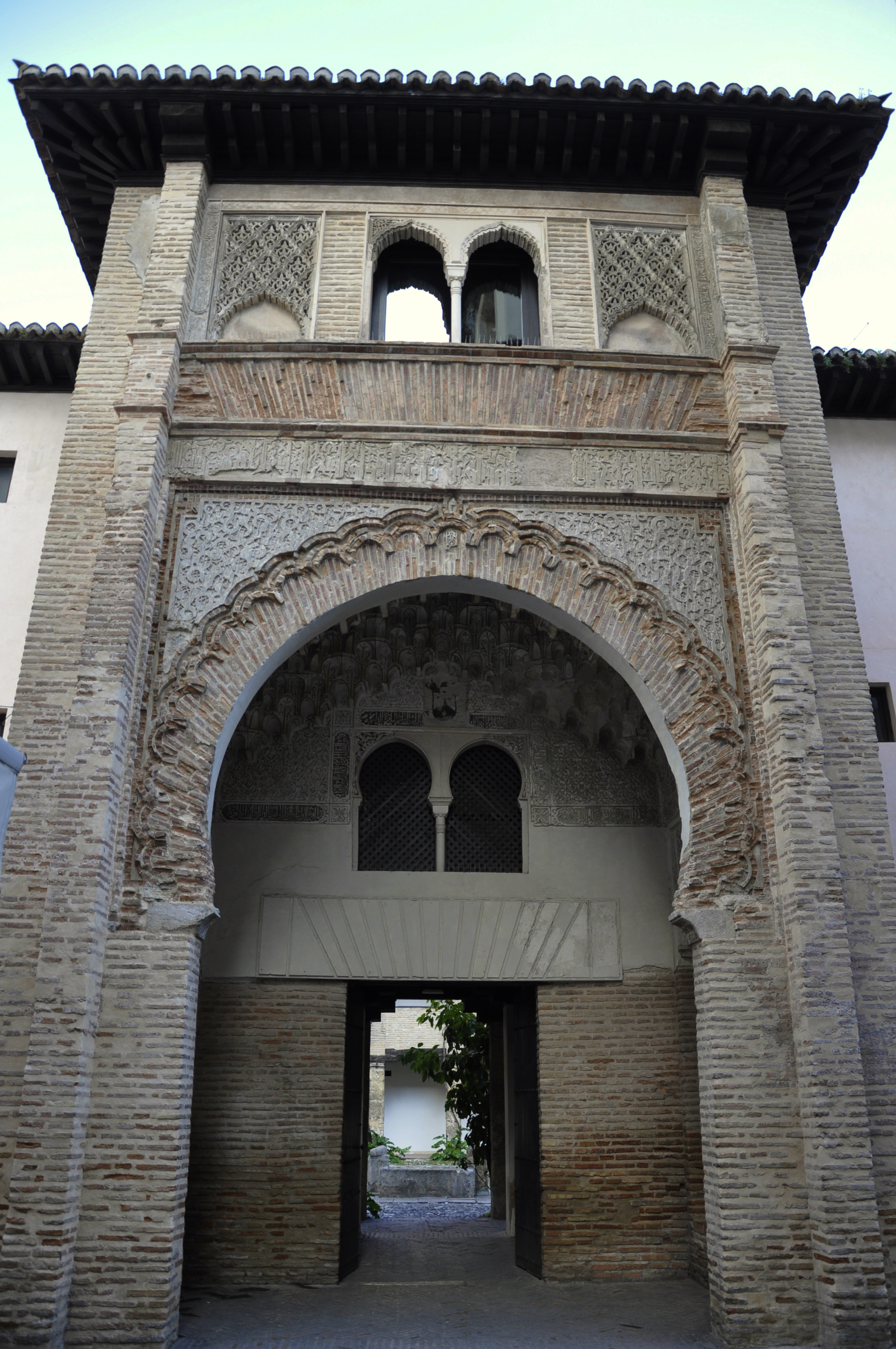
Entrance of the Corral del Carbón, a former urban caravanserai in Granada, Spain (14th century, Nasrid period)

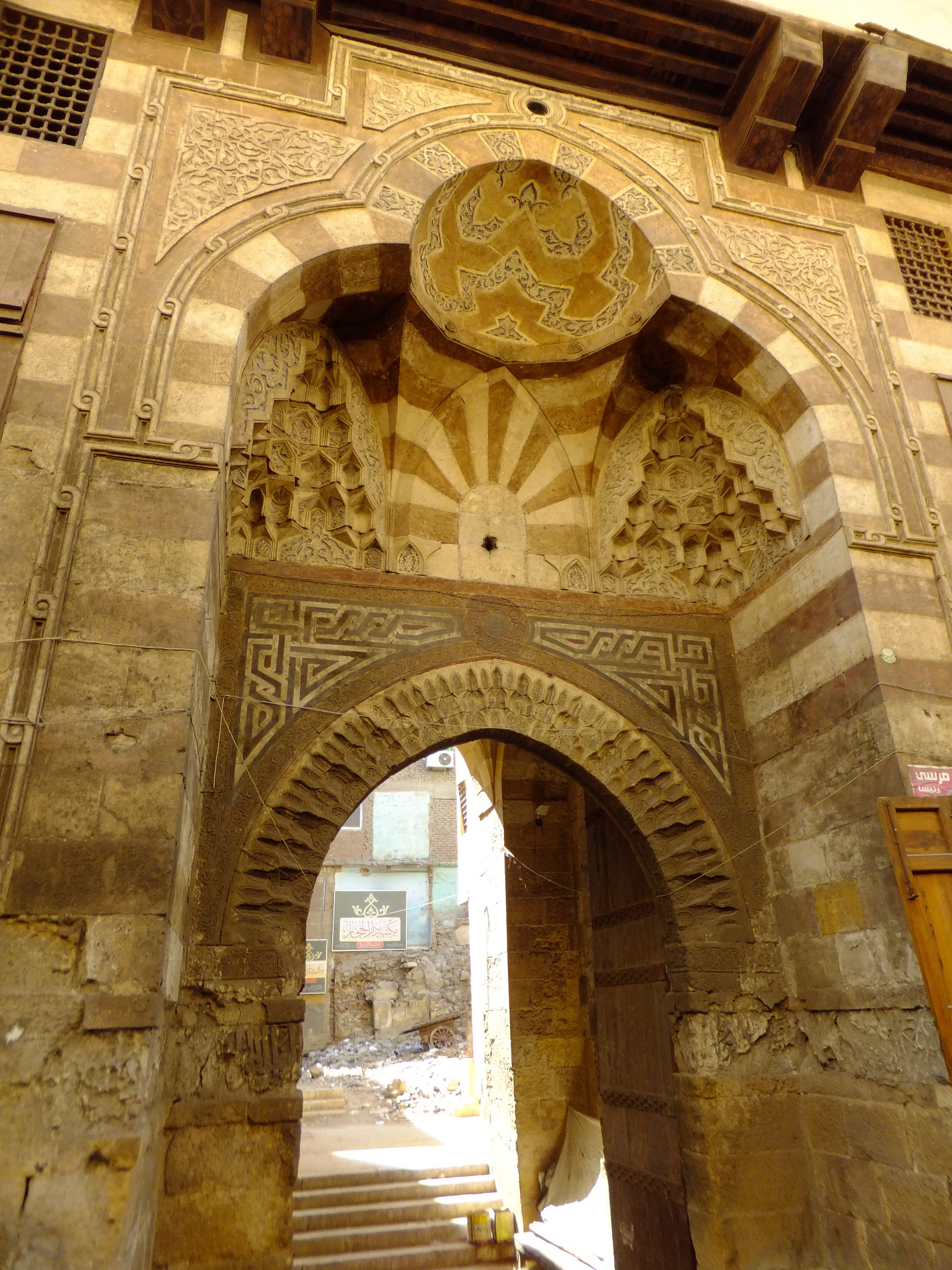
Entrance of the Wikala of Sultan Qaytbay in Cairo, Egypt (1477, Mamluk period)

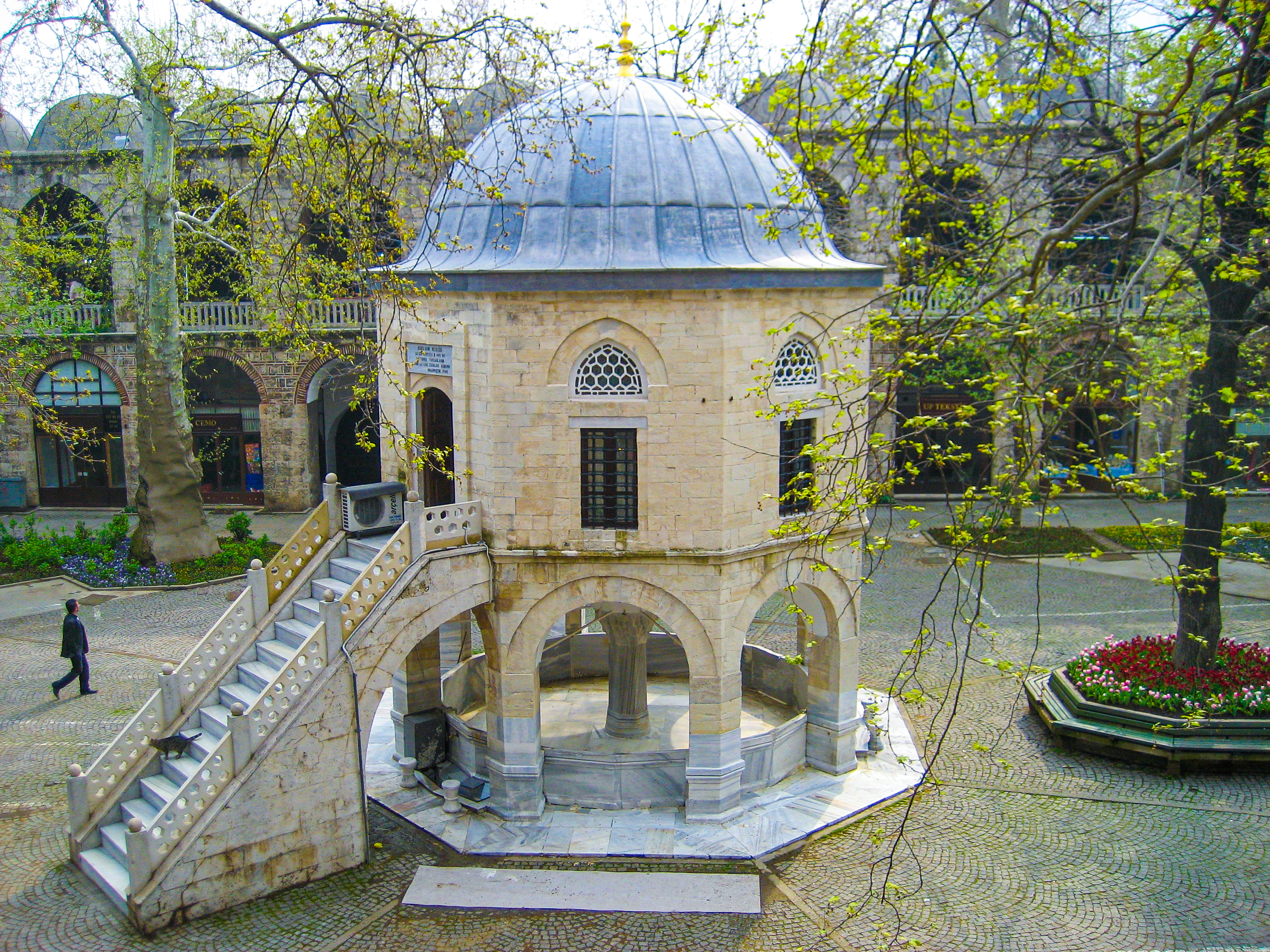
Courtyard of the Koza Han in Bursa, Turkey (1491, Ottoman period) ; the domed building is a small mosque

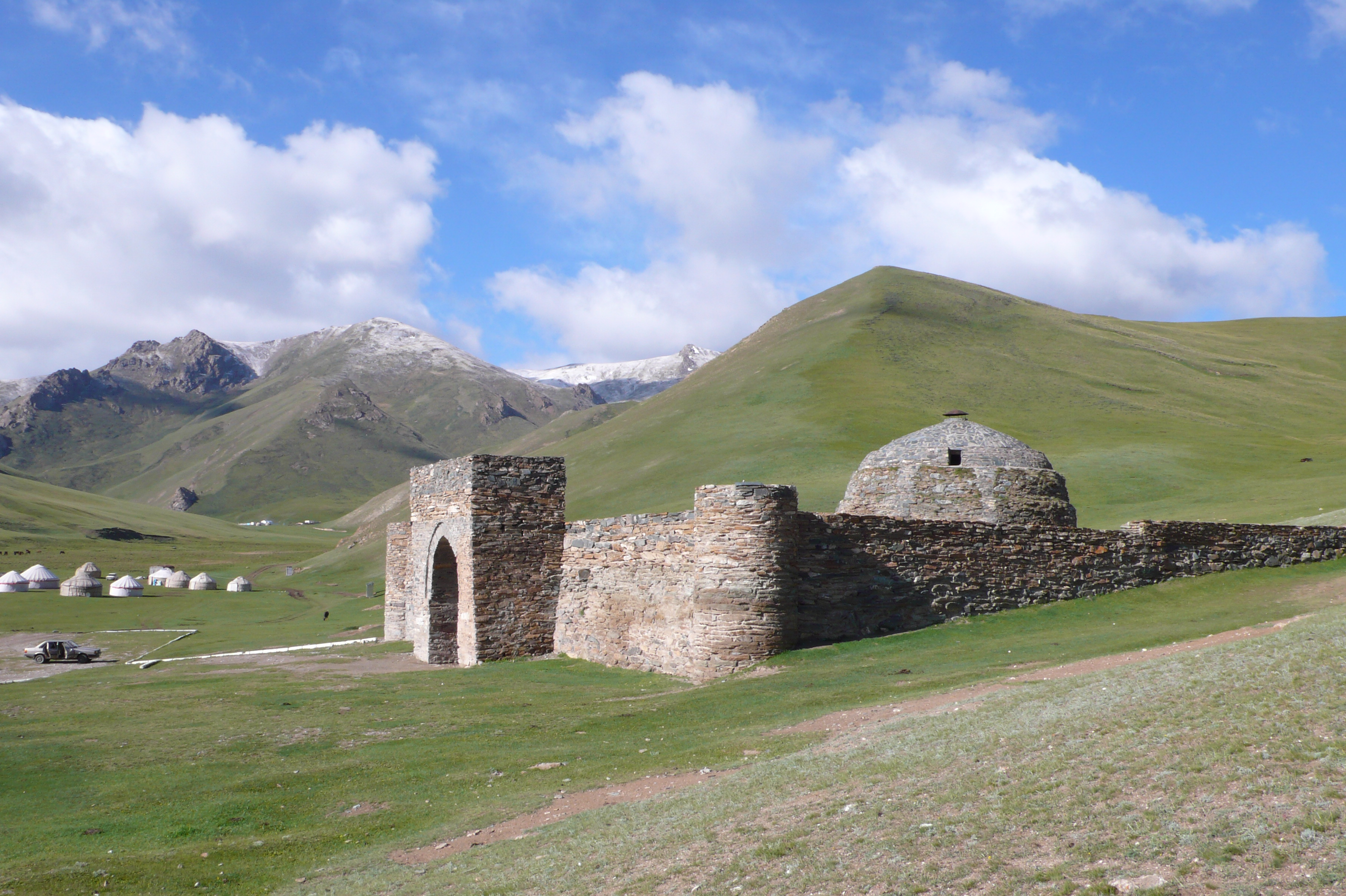
Tash Rabat caravanserai in Kyrgyzstan

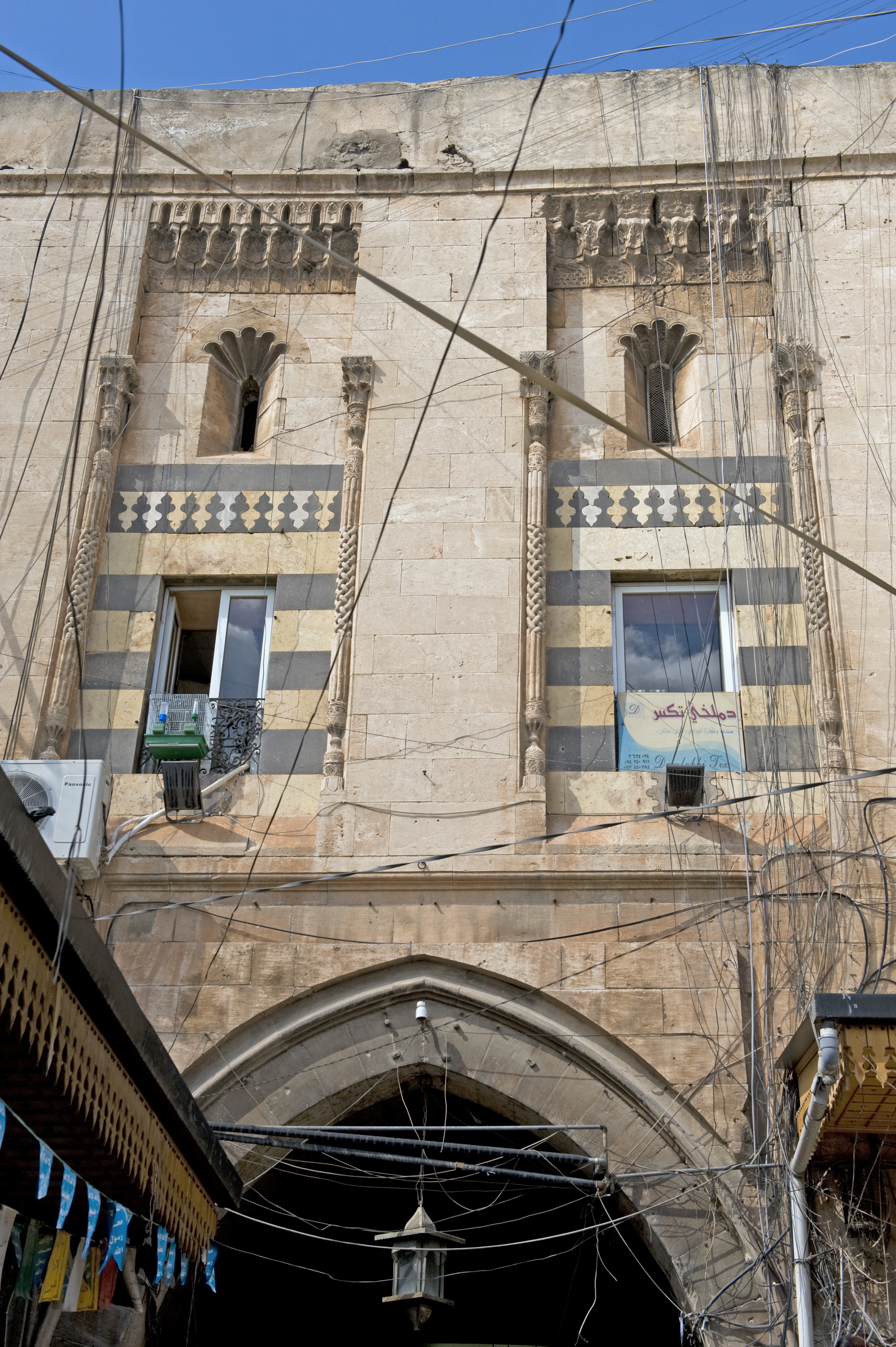
Interior façade of a gate from the courtyard of Khan al-Jumruk in Aleppo, Syria (1574)

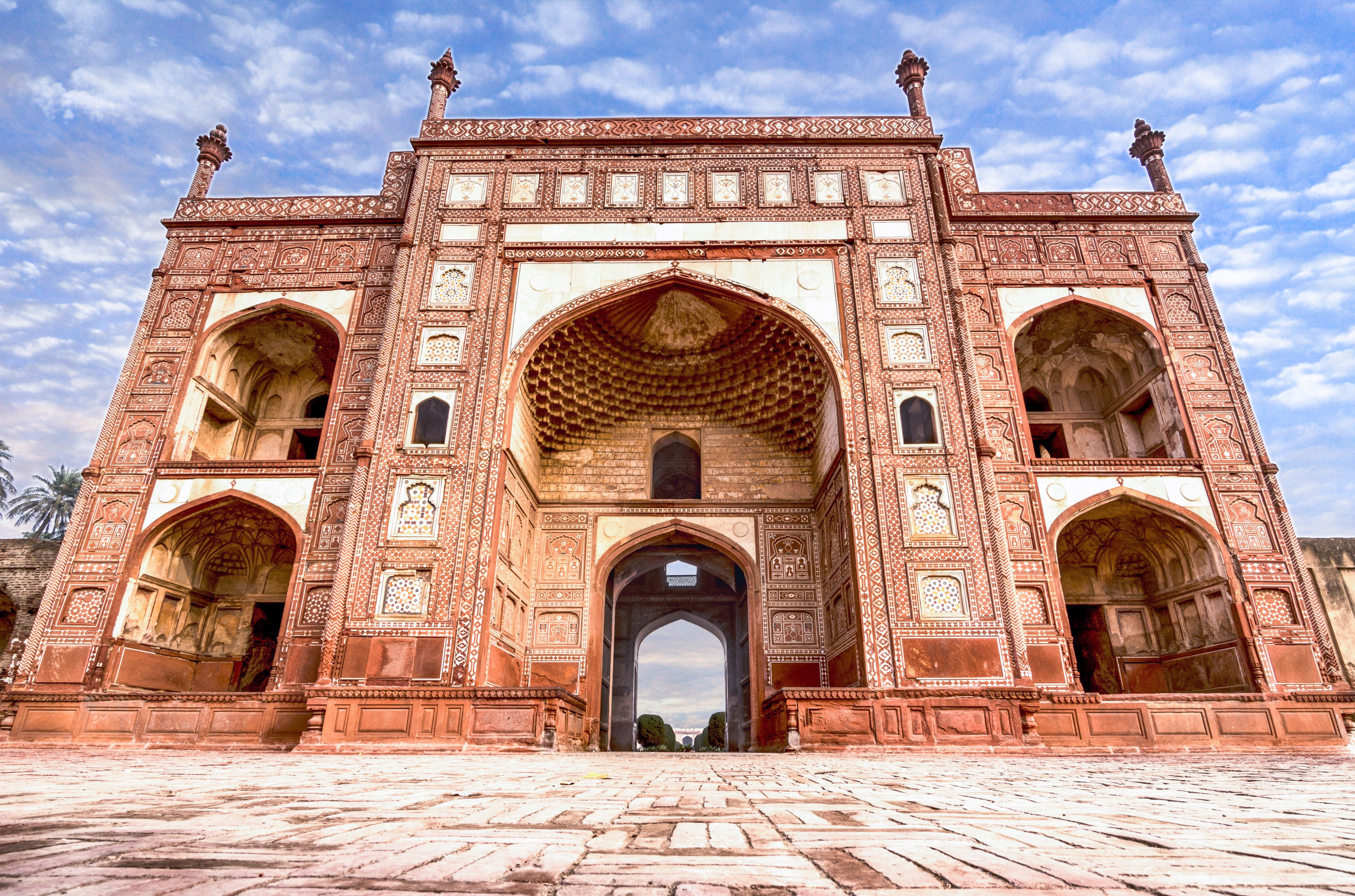
Gateway of Akbari Sarai in Lahore, Pakistan (16th century, with later additions)

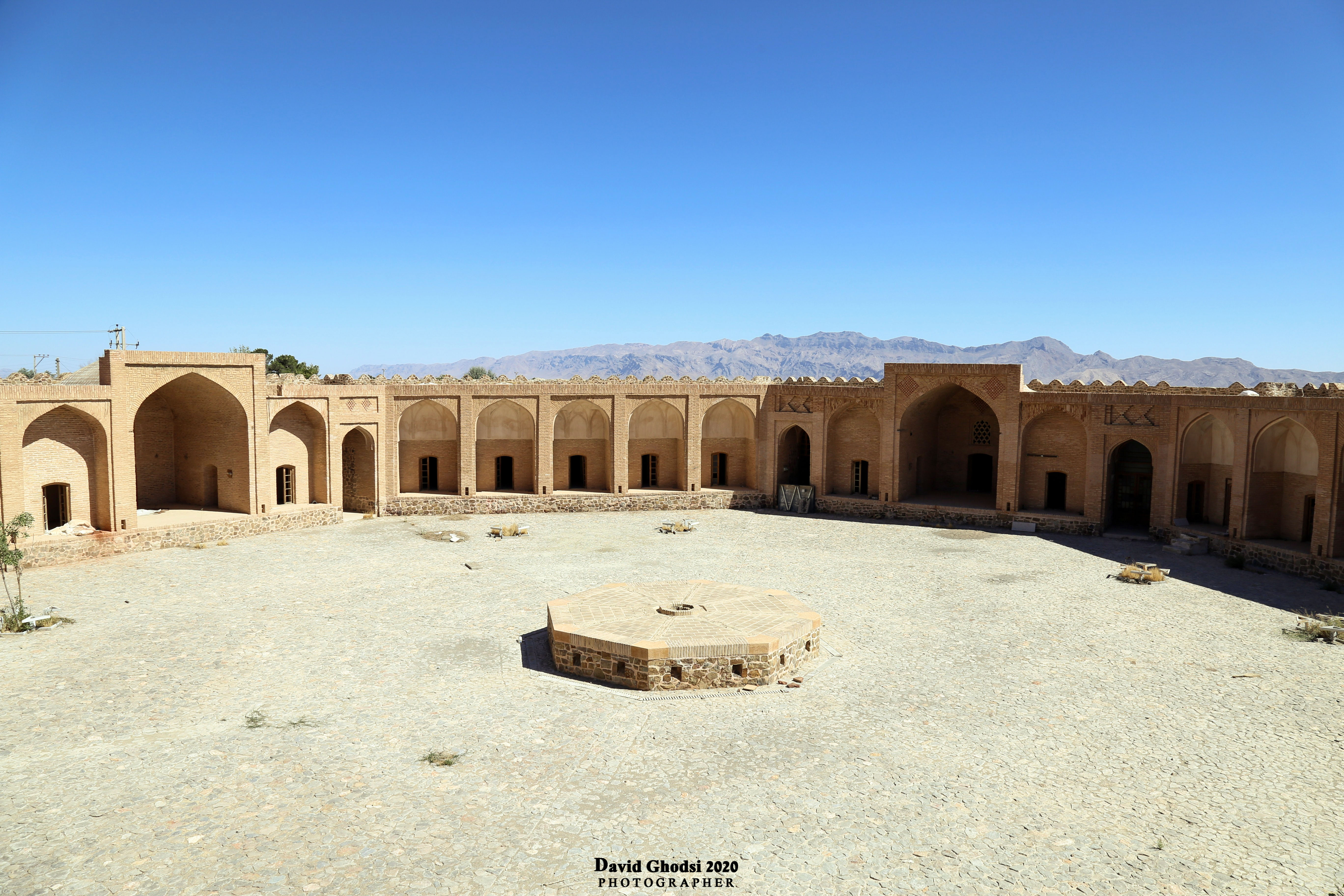
Caravanserai of Aminabad, Shahreza, Persia , with an octagonal layout (17th century, Safavid period)

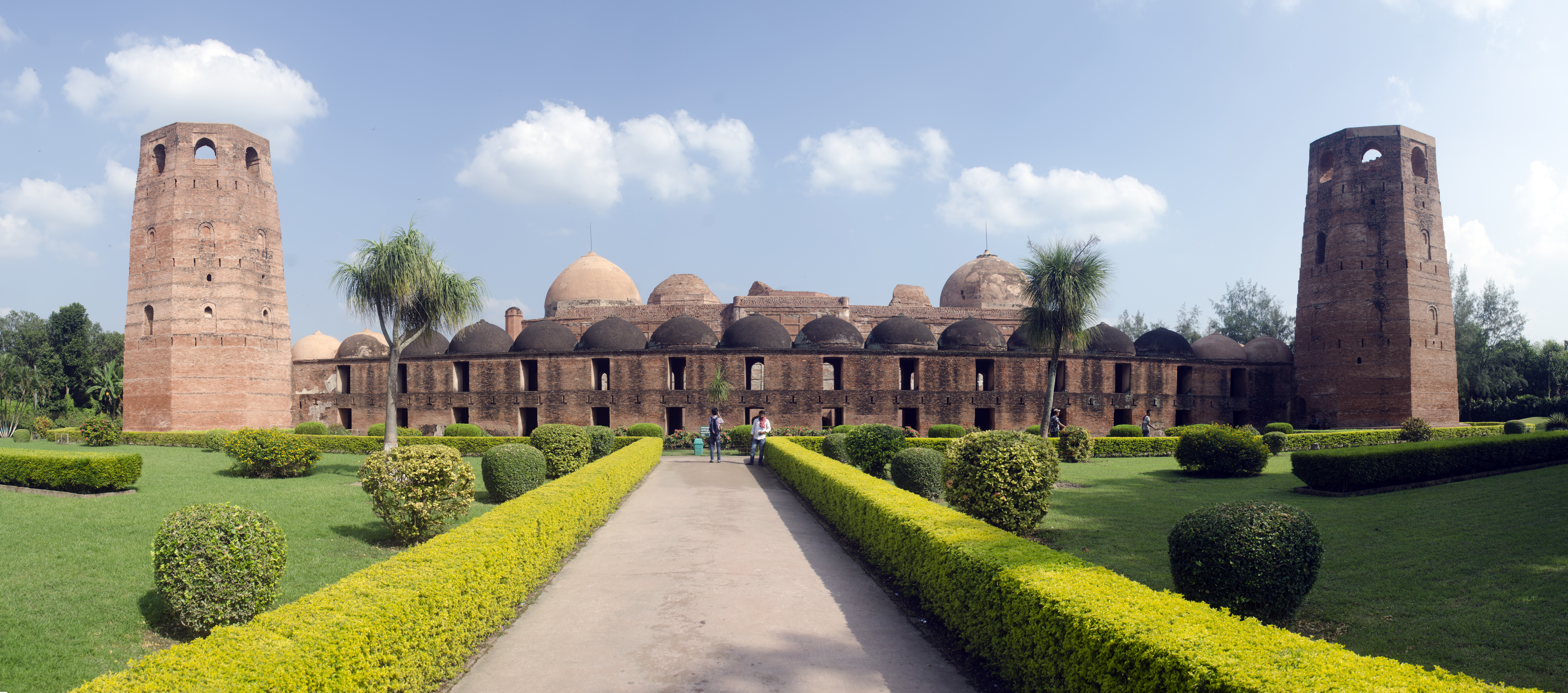
The Caravanserai Mosque in Murshidabad, India, built by Murshid Quli Khan of Bengal (early 18th century)

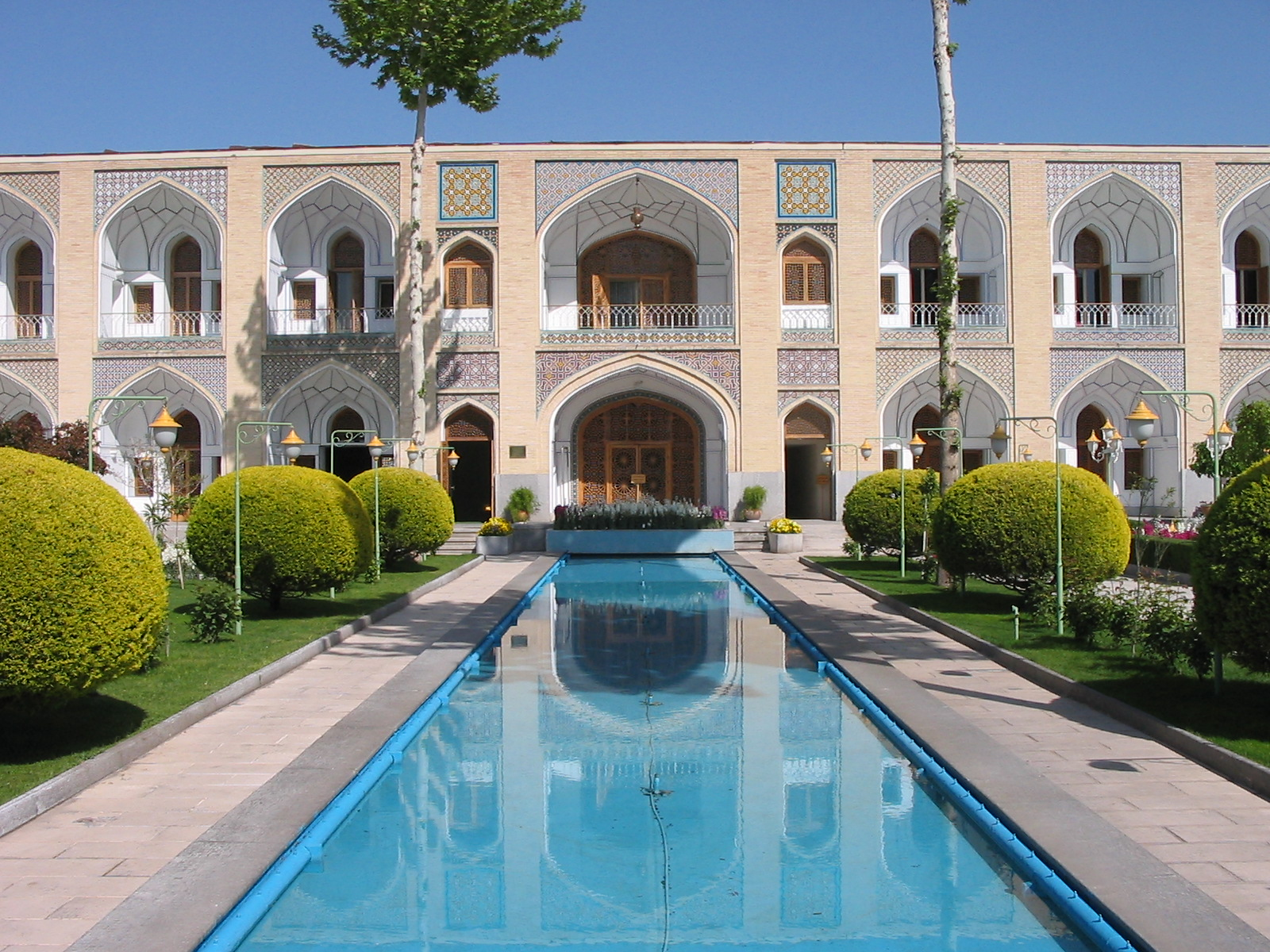
Interior of a large Safavid caravanserai in Isfahan, Iran (early 18th century, now the Abbasi Hotel)

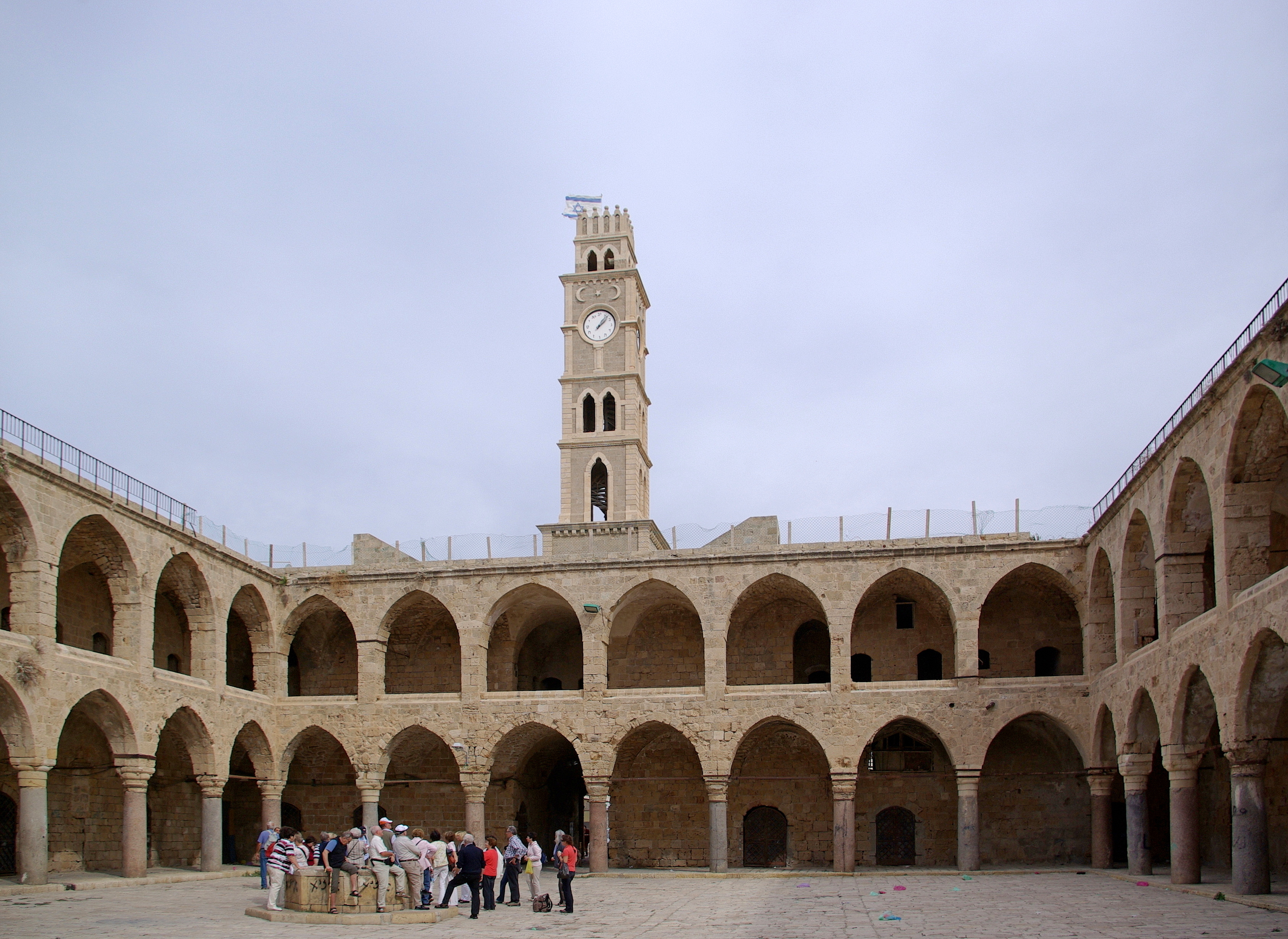
Khan al-Umdan in Acre, Israel (18th century, with clock tower added in 1906)

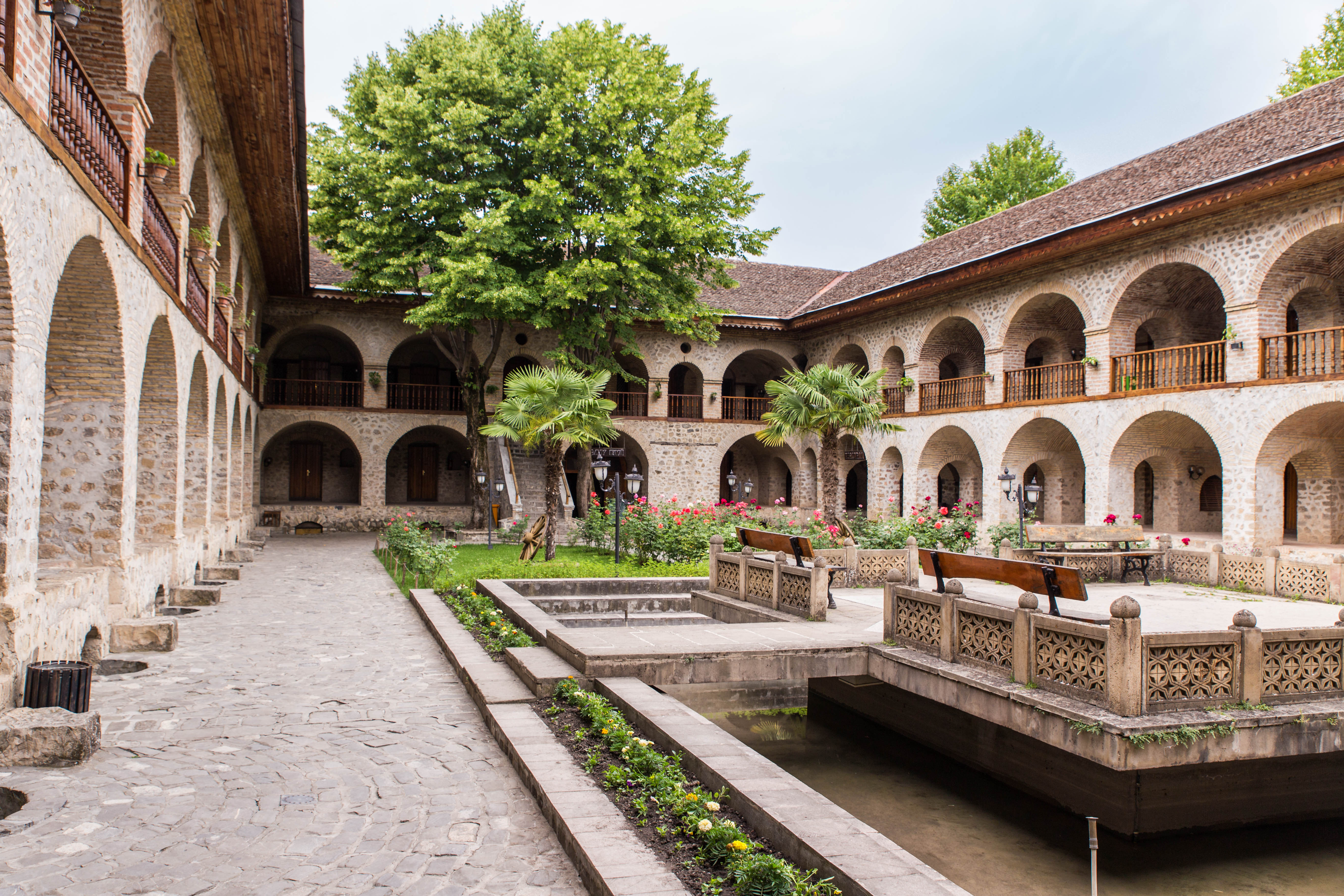
Shaki Caravanserai in Azerbaijan (19th century)

The forecourt of the Mukhtarzada Caravanserai in Herat, Afghanistan 2025

== See also ==
- List of caravanserais
- Ribat, early Muslim frontier fort, later caravanserai or Sufi retreat
- Jumeirah Archaeological Site has the foundations of a 10th century example
- Caravan city
- Coaching inn
- Motel
- Rest area
- Truck stop
