= Katra (Dhaka) =

Historical caravanserai in Bengal

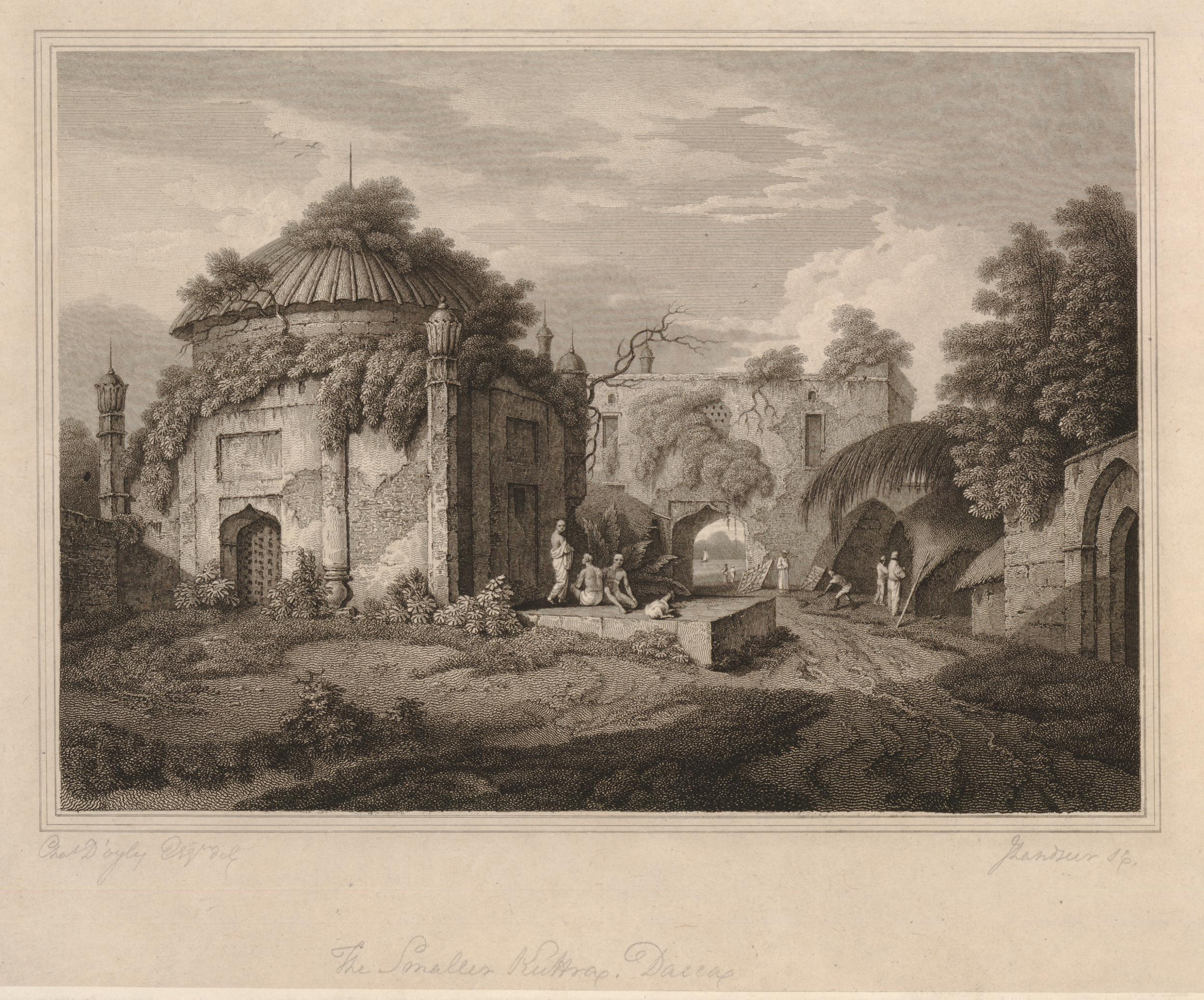
The Chhota Katra with its enclosed Mosque, Dhaka (1817) by Charles D'Oyly.

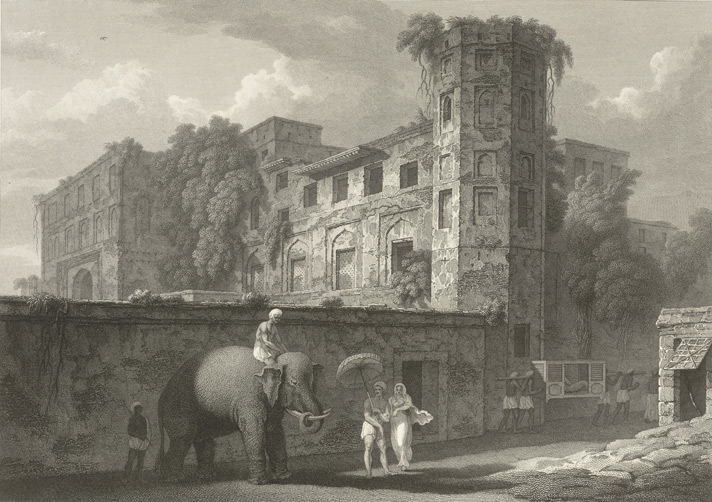
The Bara Katra, Dhaka (1823) by Charles D'Oyly.

Katra or Katara refers to a type of caravanserai, an inn or resting place, primarily found in the Bengal region (now Bangladesh and West Bengal, India). These structures were built to accommodate travellers, merchants, and their caravans.

The word "Katra" or "Katara" is derived from the Persian language, signifying a place for halting or a marketplace. In the context of the Bengal region, particularly in Dhaka, the capital of present-day Bangladesh, "Bara Katra" (Greater Katra) and "Chhota Katra" (Lesser Katra) are two of the most notable Mughal-era caravanserais that stand out due to their architectural significance and historical importance.

== History and significance of katras in Bengal ==
The Bara Katra and Chhota Katra are among the most famous examples of caravanserais built during the Mughal period in Dhaka, which was an important administrative and commercial centre of Bengal in the 17th century. These structures served not only as places of rest and trade but also played a role in the administrative and cultural activities of the city.

== Bara Katra (Greater Katra) ==
The Bara Katra, meaning "Greater Katra," was built between 1644 and 1646 by Mughal prince Shah Shuja, the second son of Emperor Shah Jahan. The structure was originally intended to be a palace for Shah Shuja but was later repurposed as a caravanserai, or inn, for merchants and travellers. The Bara Katra is an example of classic Mughal architecture with elements such as arches, domes, minarets, and an imposing gateway. It was designed as a quadrangular building, with two-storeyed arcades surrounding a central courtyard. It was fortified with thick walls and corner bastions, giving it the appearance of a fortified palace.

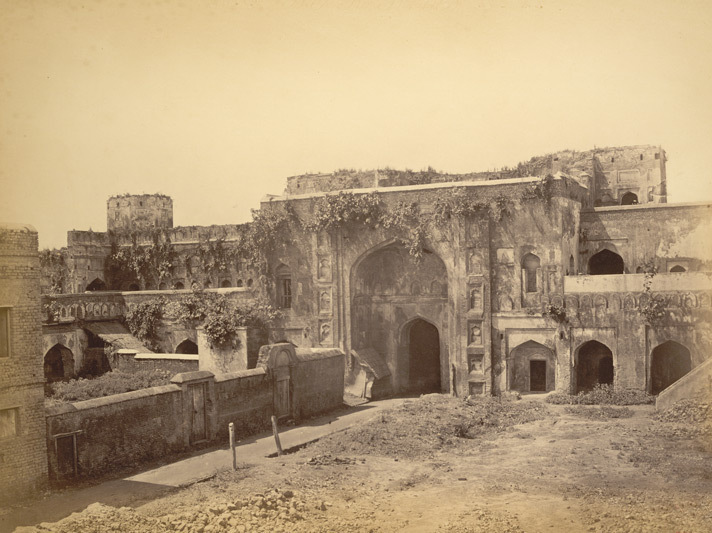
1870 photograph of Bara Katra

The structure had a grand entrance gate on the north side, adorned with intricate stucco work and floral patterns, reflecting Mughal design aesthetics. Inside, there were accommodations for travellers, prayer rooms, stables, and storage rooms for merchants to keep their goods.

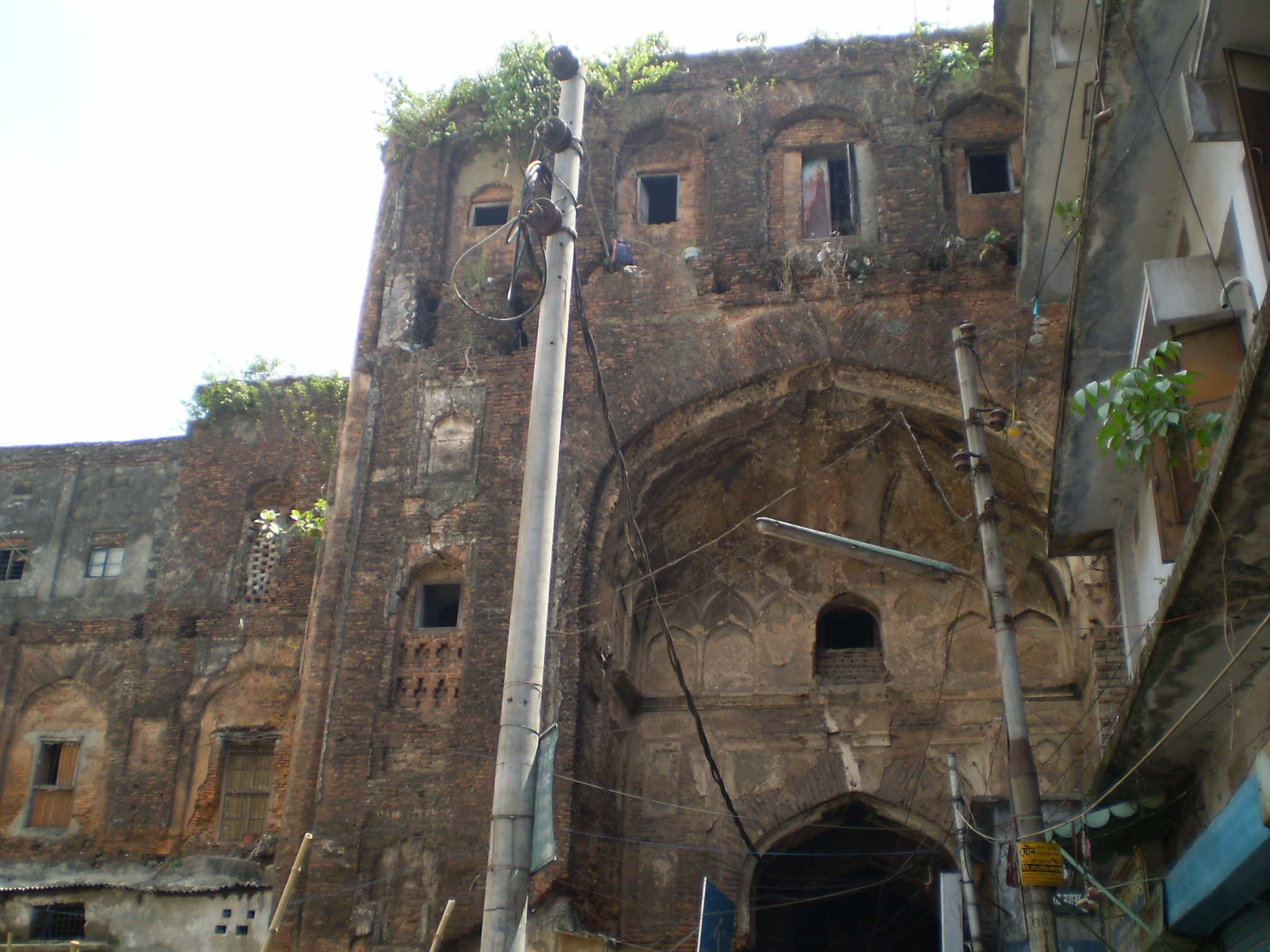
Ruins of Bara Katra in Dhaka

Over time, the structure fell into disrepair due to neglect, natural calamities, and encroachments. Today, only parts of the original structure remain, but efforts have been made by the government and conservationists to preserve this important historical site.

== Chhota Katra (Lesser Katra) ==
The Chhota Katra, meaning "Lesser Katra," was constructed between 1663 and 1664 under the auspices of Subahdar Shaista Khan, the Mughal governor of Bengal. It was smaller in scale compared to Bara Katra but followed a similar architectural pattern. Chhota Katra also featured a square layout with a central courtyard surrounded by a two-storey arcade. It had an imposing entrance with a decorated gateway that showcased the finesse of Mughal craftsmanship.

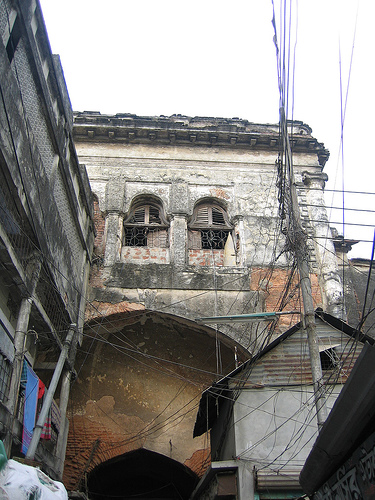
The ruins of Chhota Katra, amidst urban encroachment.

This Katra also served as an inn and included rooms for merchants, travellers, storage spaces, mosques, and prayer halls. Like Bara Katra, it also had elements of fortification and defensive architecture.

Like its larger counterpart, Chhota Katra suffered from neglect and encroachment over the centuries. Although some parts are still standing, it has been significantly altered and diminished.

== Importance of katras in Mughal Bengal ==
The Katras in Dhaka played a crucial role in fostering trade and commerce during the Mughal era. As caravanserais, they provided essential facilities for merchants, facilitating trade routes between Bengal and other parts of the Mughal Empire and beyond. These Katras were more than just inns; they were centres of social and cultural exchange. Travellers from different regions and countries would stop at these inns, contributing to the cultural melting pot that was Dhaka.

The Bara Katra and Chhota Katra are important examples of Mughal architecture in Bengal, showcasing the distinctive styles, motifs, and structural innovations of the time.

== Significance ==
The Bara Katra and Chhota Katra are significant historical and architectural landmarks that represent the cultural and commercial heritage of Mughal Dhaka. While they have suffered due to the passage of time, their historical value remains immense, serving as a testament to the region's past as a centre of trade, culture, and administration under the Mughal Empire. Conservation efforts continue to try to preserve these remnants of history of Bengal's Mughal past.

== See also ==
- Mughal architecture
