= Khatra (disambiguation) =

Khatra is a town in the state of West Bengal, India.

Khatra may also refer to:

== Places ==
all located in India

- Khatra (community development block), an administrative division in the Khatra subdivision
- Khatra subdivision, in the Bankura district in the state of West Bengal
- Khatra Adibasi Mahavidyalaya, a college located here

== Entertainment ==
- Khatra (album), a 2017 studio album by Nepalese rapper Yama Buddha
- Khatra (film), a 1991 Hindi horror fantasy film
- Khatra Khatra Khatra, an Indian comedy game show

== See also ==
- Catra, a fictional character in the Masters of the Universe franchise
- Hatra, an ancient city in Upper Mesopotamia located in present-day Iraq
- Katra (disambiguation), various uses
- Khatarah, a town in northern Iraq
