= Al-Manshiyya square =

Public square in Alexandria, Egypt

Coordinates: 31.1974°N 29.8927°E

Tahrir Square Alexandria (Arabic: ميدان التحرير Mïdän at Taḥrǐr IPA: [meˈdæːn ettæħˈɾiːɾ], English: Liberation Square) is a public town square in Alexandria, northern Egypt.

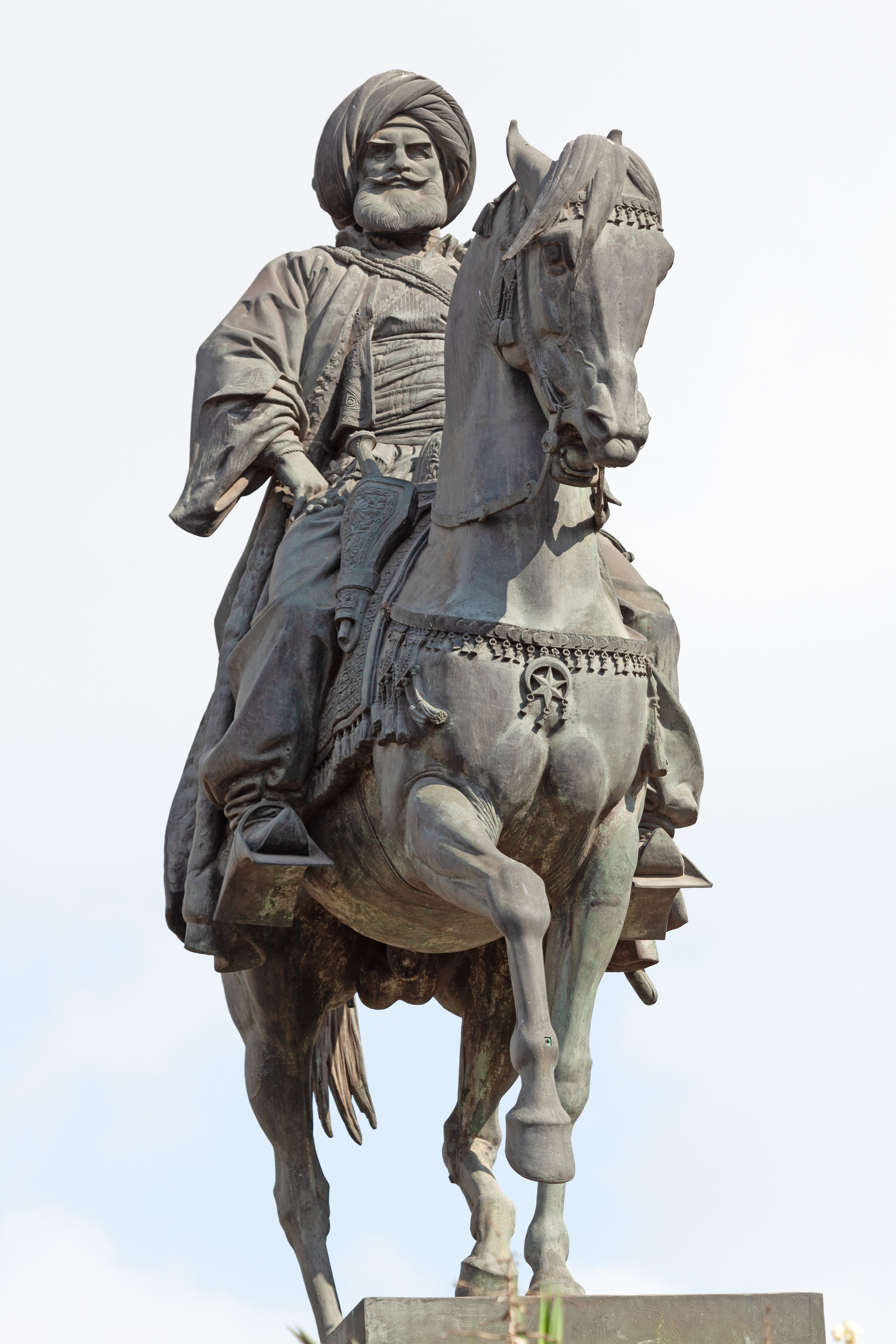
Muhammad Ali memorial in Tahrir Square
