= Katra, Lithuania =

Katra
- Village
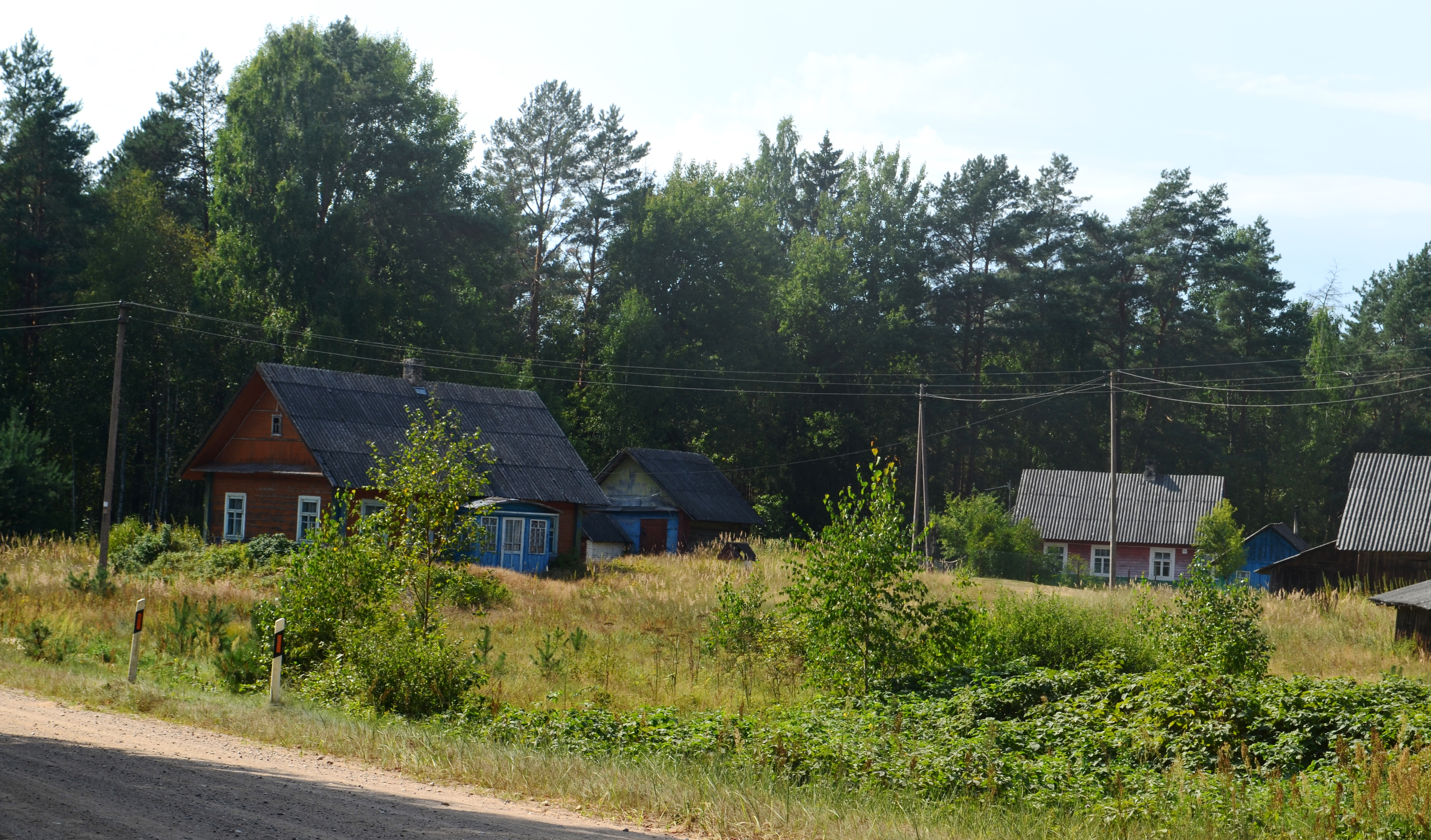

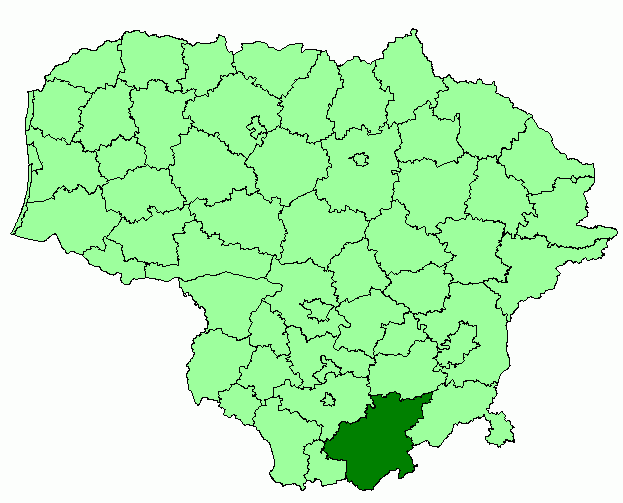
- Location in Varėna district municipality Location of Varėna district in Lithuania
- Coordinates: 53°59′20″N 24°34′08″E
- Country: Lithuania
- County: Alytus County
- Municipality: Varėna
- Eldership: Kaniavos (Kaniava)

Population (2021)
  - Total: 16
- Time zone: UTC+2 (EET)
  - Summer (DST): UTC+3 (EEST)

Katra is a village in Kaniavos eldership, Varėna district municipality, Alytus County, southeastern Lithuania. According to the 2001 census, the village had a population of 35 people. At the 2011 census, the population was 19.

Katra village is located c. 32 kilometres (20 mi) from Varėna, 19 kilometres (12 mi) from Marcinkonys, 8 kilometres (5.0 mi) from Paramėlis (the nearest settlement), 100 metres (330 ft) from the Belarusian border.

== Etymology ==
The name Katra comes from the name of the Katra River.
