= Katradevi =

Village in Maharashtra

Coordinates: 16.544°N 73.397°E

- Village
- Interactive map of Katradevi
- Country: India
- State: Maharashtra

Katradevi is a village in Rajapur taluka in Ratnagiri district of Maharashtra, India.
