= Bara Katra =

Historical and architectural monument in Dhaka

Coordinates: 23.7146°N 90.3952°E

- বড় কাটরা
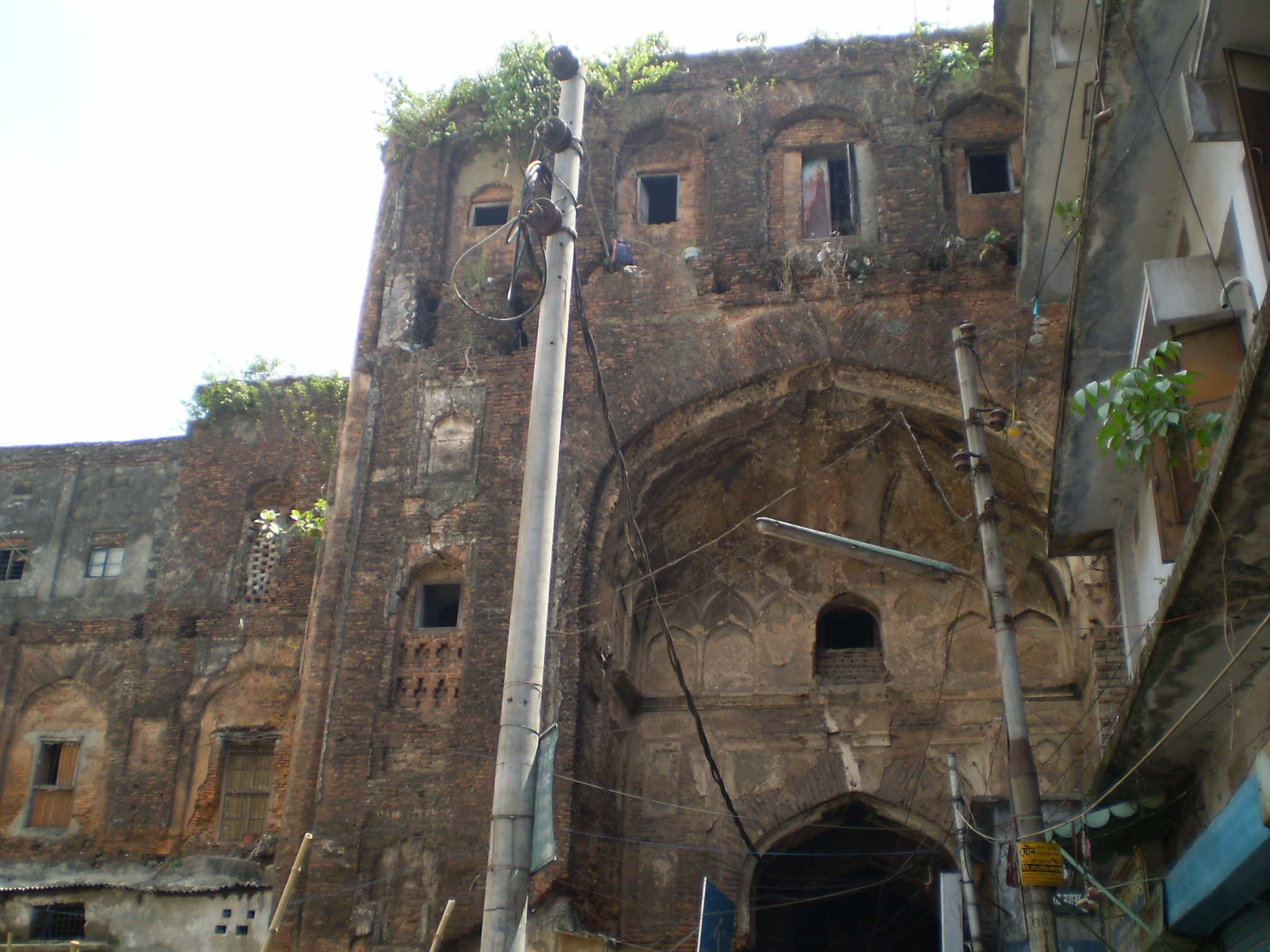
- Ruins of Bara Katra in 2008
- Interactive map of Bara Katra
- Location: Dhaka
- Type: Mughal building
- Material: Brick
- Beginning date: 1644
- Completion date: 1646

Bara Katra (Bengali: বড় কাটরা; lit. 'Great Caravanserai') is one of the oldest historical and architectural monuments in Dhaka. The word Katra may have originated from Arabic word Katara which means colonnaded building. 'Katra/ katara' in Arabic and Persian means 'Caravan (Karwan) Sarai' or simply a 'Sarai'. It is a palatial building dating to the reign of the Mughal dynasty in the Bengal region. It is situated to the south of Chowk Bazaar close to the north bank of the river Buriganga. It was partially demolished in 2022.

== History ==
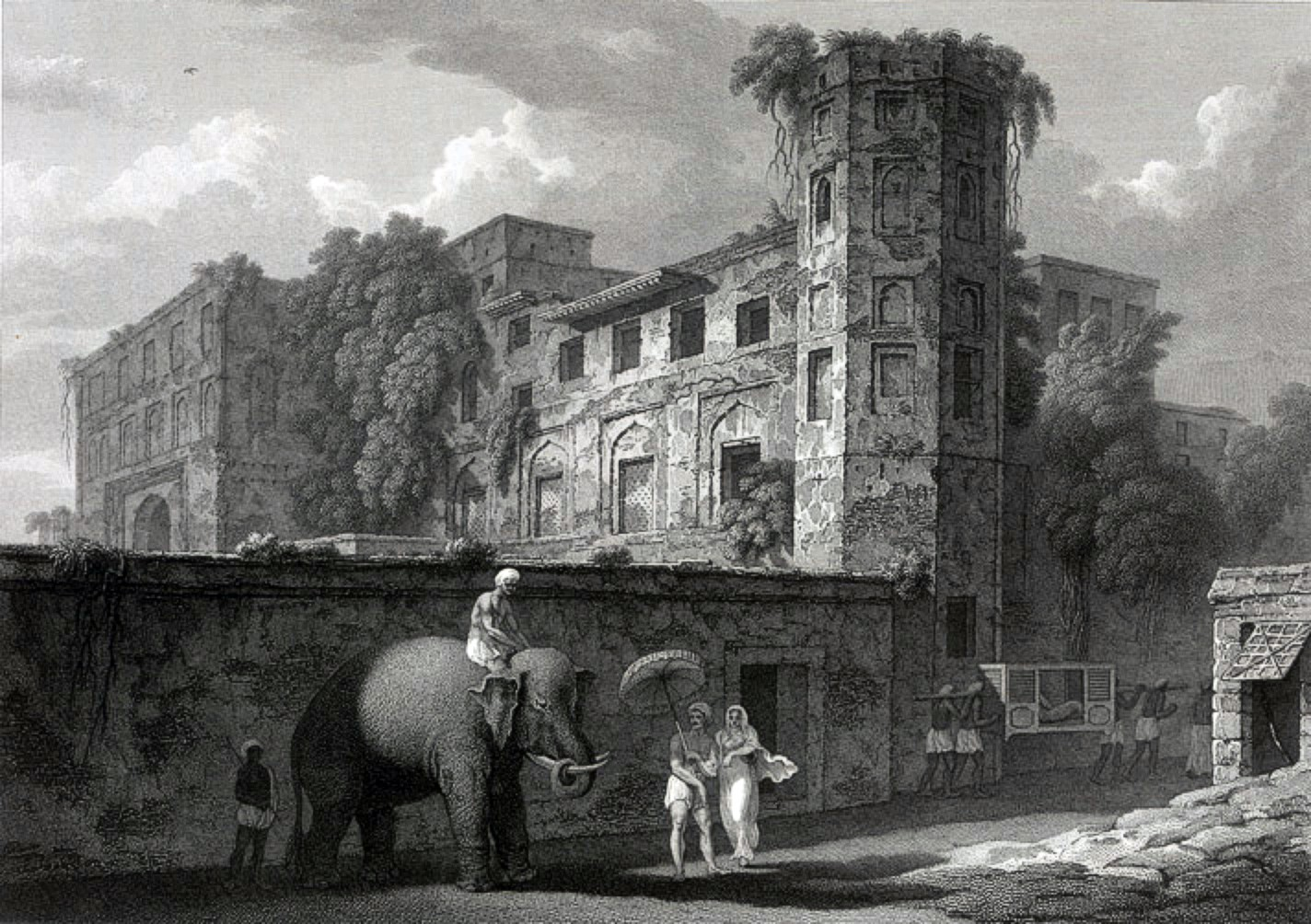
1823 etching of Bara Katra by Sir Charles D'Oyly

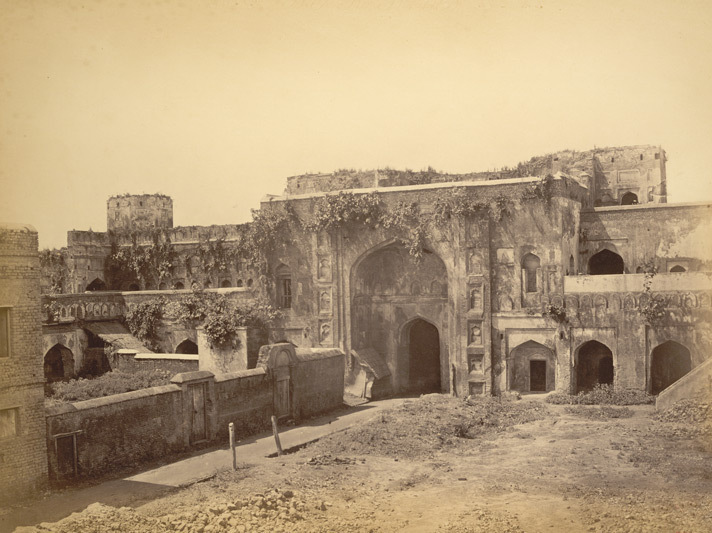
1870 photograph of Bara Katra

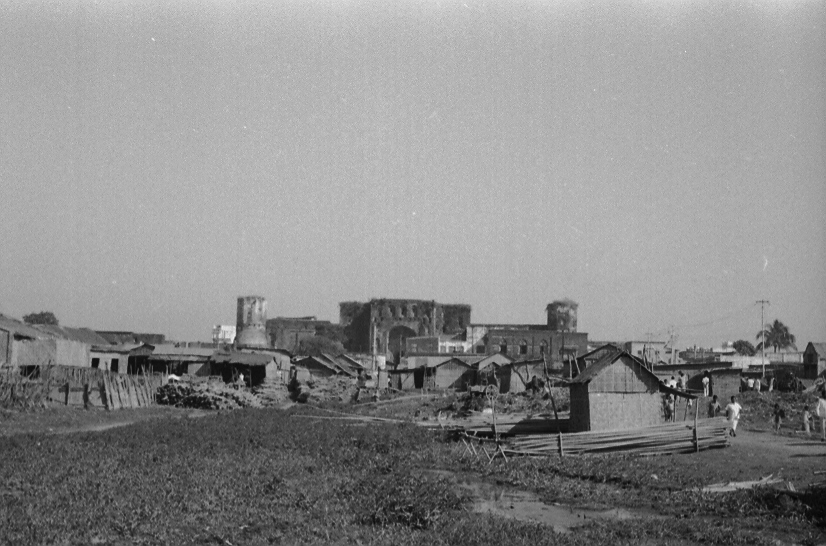
1975 view of Bara Katra from the south

Bara Katra was built between 1644 and 1646 AD by Mir Abul Qasim, the diwan (chief revenue official) of Mughal prince Shah Shuja. It was intended to be Shah Shuja's residence, but Shah Shuja endowed it to Mir Abul Qasem.

Less than half of the structure remains, and it is in disrepair. The Department of Archaeology has been unable to take charge of the monument owing to litigation and resistance from its owners. The owners have altered the original building and encroached upon it with new construction.

Abul Qasim al-Husaini at-Tabtaba as-Simnani built this edifice, endowing it with twenty-two shops, attached to it, on the rightful and lawful condition that the officials in charge of the endowment would expend the income derived from them upon the repairs of the building and upon the poor and that they should not take any rent from any deserving person alighting therein, so that the pious act may reflect upon the monarch in this world and that they should not act contrariwise, or else they would be called to account on the Day of Retribution.

— An inscription composed by Mughal poet Sa'ad-uddin Muhammad Shirazi

== Architecture ==
The building follows the traditional pattern of Central Asian caravanserais and is embellished as per Mughal architecture. Originally it enclosed a quadrangular courtyard.

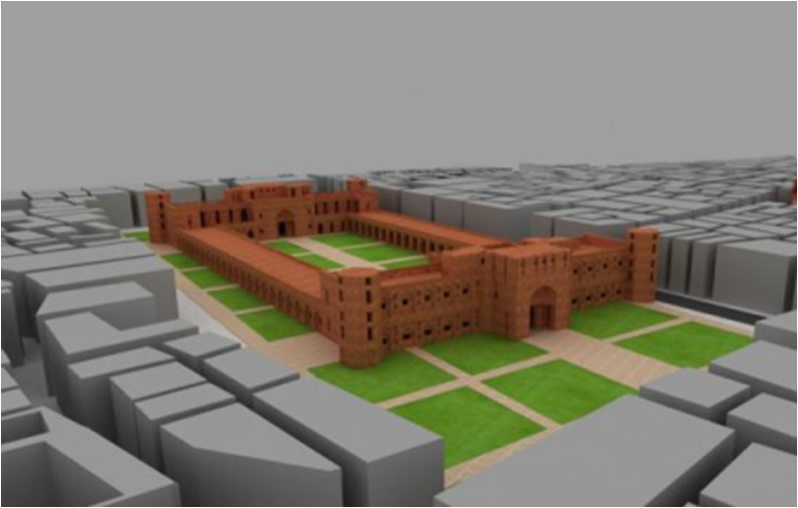
A reconstructed model of the Bara Katra

The southern wing extends 67.97 metres (223.0 ft), and fronted on the Buriganga River. In the middle is an entrance set in a three-storeyed projected bay. The gateway has an arched alcove that rises to the second story, above which are the windows of the third storey. The arched main entrance is in the centre of the alcove. The underside of the alcove, spandrels, and surrounding walls are decorated with plastered panels exhibiting a variety of forms, including four-centered, cusped, horseshoe, and flat arches. The main portion of the wing is two-storeyed and bookended by tall projected octagonal towers.

The northern wing was similar, but with a less elaborate gate. The east and west wings were single storey and about 70.10 metres (230.0 ft) long. In the 19th century, Orientalist James Atkinson described the building as "a stupendous pile of grand and beautiful architecture".

The southern entrance leads to a guardroom, then an octagonal domed hall (the ceiling of which is plastered and decorated with net-patters and foliage designs), and finally to the courtyard. On the ground floor of the southern wing, there are five vaulted rooms to either side of the gateway. On the upper floor, living chambers open off of a corridor. Shops and living quarters surrounded the courtyard on all four sides.

== Cultural significance ==
During the Mughal period, Dhaka was a port city. Large merchant ship could enter into the Buriganga river. This was the major trading connection between Indonesia and Dhaka. So, it was a major hub for import and export. Bara Katra was mainly used for customs clearance and resting space for merchants and travelers. This type of Caravan Sarai which consists of so many functions and features which makes it the most unique worldwide. This increases the value of architectural and cultural heritage of Bangladesh.

== See also ==
- Choto Katra
- Lalbagh Fort
- List of archaeological sites in Bangladesh
