= Choto Katra =

Historical and architectural monument in Dhaka

Coordinates: 23.7130°N 90.3962°E

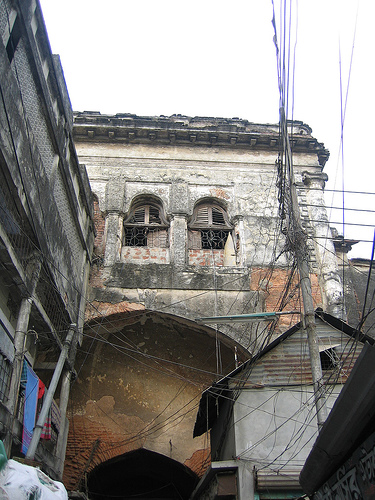
The ruins of Chhota Katra, amidst urban encroachment.

Choto Katra (Bengali: ছোট কাটারা; Small Katra) is one of two Katras built during Mughal rule in Dhaka, Bangladesh. It was constructed in 1663 by Subahdar Shaista Khan. It is on the Hakim Habibur Rahman lane on the bank of the Buriganga River. It was built to accommodate officials and Shaista Khan's expanding family. Chhota Katra is slightly smaller than the Bara Katra, but similar in plan and about 185 m (607 ft) east of it.

== Origin ==
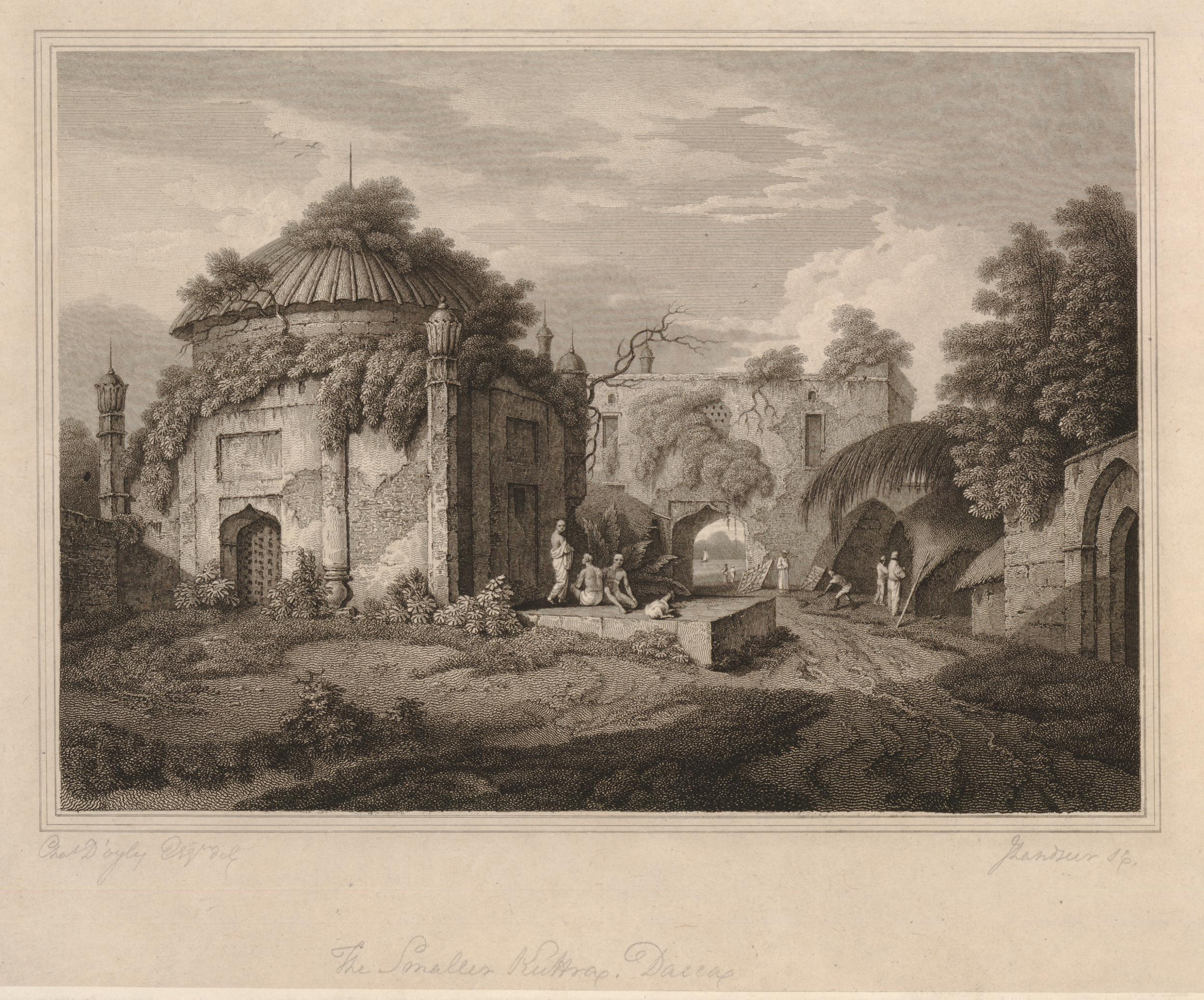
The Choto Katra with its enclosed Mosque, Dhaka (1817) by Charles D'Oyly's

Katra is a form of cellular dormitory built around an oblong courtyard; the form originated in Persia. However, the term may have been derived from Arabic word Katara which meant colonnaded building, or could be a corrupt French word used for a residential quarter. Other synonyms of it are Chuttre (French) and Chatrra (Hindi), both meaning Umbrella, were used for a place that sheltered pilgrims.

== History ==
Chhota Katra was built between 1663 and 1671. During the first reign of Shaista Khan, then Subahdar of Bengal. It held an important place in the cityscape suggesting their prominence in the Mughal Dhaka.

Since the shift of Mughal capital in 1713, the Katra started to lose its importance along with the city, though Naib Nazim Jissarat Khan briefly stayed here before his palace was built in 1765 in Nimtali.

The British made some additions to the Choto Katra, once used by the first English Medium School in Dhaka (1816) set up by Padre Leonardo, and then the first normal school (1857). The Nawabs of Dhaka rented the places as a coal and lime go-down for sometime. Attempts by the archaeology department in the past to take over the structure and restore it to its original state have been unsuccessful.

Besides this Katra, there were several more such cellular structures mainly used as inns or residential enclaves, for example Maya Katra, Muqim Katra, Nawab Katra, etc. These Katras are the few reminiscences of residential quarters in Dhaka or elsewhere in Bengal built during Mughal period.

== Architecture ==
=== Exterior ===
The Katra is rectangular in plan, 101.20 m (332.0 ft) X 92.05 m (302.0 ft) externally and 81.07 m (266.0 ft) X 69.19 m (227.0 ft) internally. The thickness of the outer walls is 0.91 m (3 ft 0 in) to 1.00 m (3 ft 3 in) and the maximum thickness of the bastion walls is 1.22 m (4 ft 0 in). It has two gateways - one to the north and the other to the south. The southern one is the main entrance. Both the gateways, though much altered recently are still in comparatively bad conditions. There are also two octagonal towers in the two outer corners of the south wall of the structure.

The structures around the courtyard have undergone much renovation, reconstruction and repair. Many modern extensions were also added to the original building. The three storied gateway on the river side has assumed some colonial features. The triple windows and the lofty angled towers reflect the colonial influence during subsequent restoration.

=== Interior ===
Inside, there is the tomb of Champa Bibi, but there is no accurate history regarding her identity. There was a small mosque within its enclosure which is ruined. The one-dome square mausoleum of Champa Bibi, a listed building now, was within its enclosure which was torn down by Padre Shepherd. It was later reconstructed by the archaeologists, but is now lost within multitude of shops at Champatali. As depicted by Charles D'Oyly (who mistook the mausoleum for a mosque) it appears to have been a multi-foil saucer dome with slim corner spandrels. Champa Bibi was either Shaista Khan's daughter or a local concubine whom he later married. Shaista Khan's Bengali heirs from Champa Bibi's lineage used to live in Choto Katra for many years as Shaista Khan owned the Katra.

== See also ==
- List of archaeological sites in Bangladesh
- List of mosques in Bangladesh
