= Farhat Banu =

Bengali politician

Member of the Bengal Legislative Assembly
- In office 1937–1945
- Succeeded by: Anwara Khatun
- Constituency: Women's (Dacca)

Personal details
- Born: 24 October 1902
- Died: 11 September 1984 (aged 81)
- Spouse: Khawaja Shahabuddin (m. 1915)
- Children: Tahera Kabir; Khwaja Zakiuddin; Khwaja Wasiuddin
- Parent: Khwaja Atiqullah (father)

Farhat Banu was the daughter of Khwaja Atiqullah of the Dhaka Nawab family and granddaughter of Nawab Khwaja Ahsanullah, the third Nawab of Dhaka. She was a member of the Bengal Legislative Assembly in British India.

== Career ==
Farhat Banu was a Member of the Bengal Legislative Assembly, the largest legislature in the British Raj. She was also a member of the select committee and one 21 women members in that committee. She introduced The Orphanages and Widows Home Act inn 1944 in the Bengal Legislative Assembly. She gave a copy of the bill to Kumudini Basu, Secretary of the Nari Raksha Samiti.

== Personal life ==
Farhat Banu was married to Khwaja Shahabuddin of the Dhaka Nawab family in 1912. Khwaja Shahabuddin was the Governor of Northwest Frontier Province of Pakistan and served as a Minister in the Cabinet of Pakistan. Khwaja Shahabuddin died on 9 February 1977 in Karachi, Pakistan. Her father was Nawabzada Khwaja Atiqullah was also a member of the Dhaka Nawab family and her uncle, Sir Khwaja Salimullah, was the Nawab of Dhaka. Her son was Lieutenant General Khwaja Wasiuddin. Her another son was Khwaja Zakiuddin, a banker in East Pakistan. Zakiuddin was married to Begum Binoo Zakiuddin, they had two daughters Almas Zakiuddin and Yasmeen Murshed and one son Zahed Zakiuddin. Her husband's niece, Hashmat Ara Begum, was married to Khondoker Fazle Sobhan, one of their son is, noted economist Rehman Sobhan.
