= Paribagh =

Paribagh পরীবাগ
- Neighbourhood
- Location in Dhaka Location in Dhaka Division Location in Bangladesh
- Coordinates: 23.7436704°N 90.393665°E
- Country: Bangladesh
- Division: Dhaka Division
- District: Dhaka District

Government
  - Type: City corporation
  - Body: DSCC

Languages
  - National: Bengali
- Time zone: UTC+6:00 (BST)
- PIN code: 1205

Paribagh is a neighborhood of Dhaka. It is situated in the north of Shahbagh. It was once the residence of the Dhaka Nawab family. It is now popular for the food street located on Old Elephant Road.

== Name ==
There are two theories about the naming of Paribagh area. According to many, Paribagh area is named after Pari Bano, daughter of Nawab Bahadur Sir Khwaja Ahsanullah. Pari Bano was the half-sister of Khwaja Salimullah. It was the garden house of Nawabs of Dhaka. Before that the area belonged to Hindu landlords. Salimullah bought the area from the Hindu landlords. The garden house came to be known as Paribagh as the abode of Pari Bano. Another view is that Salimullah visited Patna without informing his father. He married Pari Begum there. As Pari Begum used to live in Paribagh, the area is named Paribagh.

== History ==
In this area in 1902 Khwaja Salimullah planned to build a garden house of Dhaka Nawab family. There were many low places in this area which were always waterlogged. He filled the low lands and made gardens there. He built many buildings in this area, one of which is the Paribagh House. Three years after starting work on the garden, he established a mosque in the area which still exists. In 1952, after the government of East Bengal acquired the property of the Nawab family of Dhaka, Khwaja Habibullah, another member of the family, started to build a residence called Green House in the area. Since then, most of the members of the family lived in Paribagh.

== Food street ==
There is a street food zone in this area. The street food zone is located on Old Elephant Road. In every evening, makeshift food stalls line both sides of the street. It is one of the popular food streets in Dhaka.
