= Khwaja Atiqullah =

Indian nwab

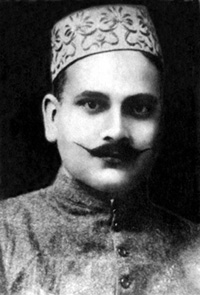
- Born: 26 July 1876; Ahsan Manzil, Bengal, British India
- Died: 21 January 1945 (aged 68); Dacca, Bengal, British India
- Political party: Indian National Congress
- Spouses: Begum Ahmadi Jan; Asgari Khanam; Begum Azizunnesa
- Children: 7, including Farhat Bano
- Father: Nawab Khwaja Ahsanullah

Khwaja Atiqullah (Urdu: خواجہ عتیق اللہ; 1876–1945) was a Bengali British Indian politician and member of the Dhaka Nawab Family.

== Early life ==
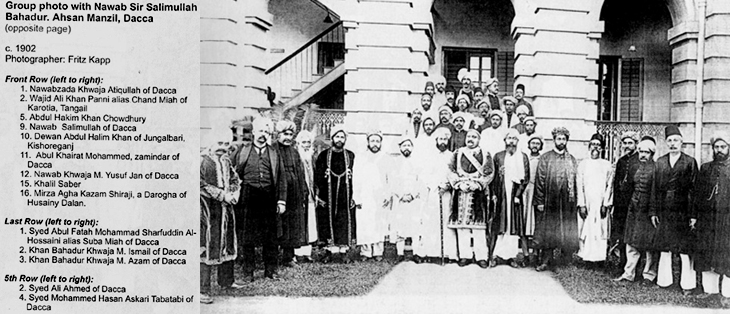
Atiqullah pictured with the Muslim elite of Dacca.

He was born on 26 July 1876. He was taught by private British teachers. He learned English, Persian and Urdu. He was noted for his philanthropy. He donated one thousand rupees to the Aligarh University Fund in 1911. The Nawab of Dhaka, his father Nawab Sir Khwaja Ahsanullah celebrated the Atiqullah's marriage on 7 December 1901, by donating four hundred thousand rupees for the electrification of Dhaka.

== Career ==
On 31 December 1906, he petitioned the British Raj to reconsider the Partition of Bengal. Initially, he was an advocate of United India and Muslim-Hindu unity. He was a proponent of Syed Ahmed Khan. He later changed his views after the annulment of the partition on 12 December 1911. Nawab Bahadur Sir Khwaja Salimullah held a meeting of the leading Bengali Muslims, where Atiqullah supported a new partition. He proposed the Muslim majority region of Assam province to be included in the proposed East Bengal.

He had differences over the ancestral property with his brothers after Nawab Bahadur Sir Khwaja Salimullah appointed his son Khwaja Habibullah the Mutawalli (Guardian) of the property. Atiqullah filed a case claiming himself as the true Mutawalli but lost it. Initially he was a strong supporter of the Indian National Congress but later supported the All India Muslim League. He held musical and cultural events in his house, Dilkusha Garden.

== Death ==
He died in January 1945. His daughter Farhat Banu was married to Khwaja Shahabuddin, his nephew.
