= Israt Manzil Palace =

Palace in dhaka, bangladesh

Coordinates: 23.7346°N 90.3938°E

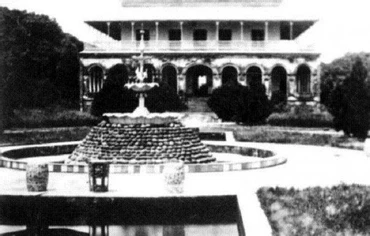
Ishrat Manzil

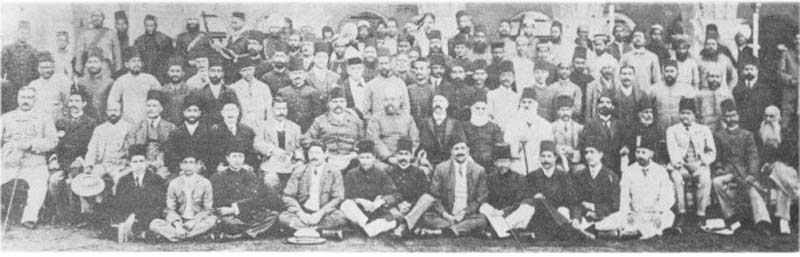
All India Muhammadan Educational Conference, in Dhaka (1906), which led to the foundation of Muslim League, on 30 December 1906.

Israt Manzil was one of the residences of the Nawabs of Dhaka. The mansion served as a retreat for members of the Dhaka Nawab Family.

Israt Manzil is best known for hosting the opening session of the All India Muhammadan Educational Conference in 1906. The conference, sponsored by Nawab Sir Khwaja Salimullah, the Nawab of Dhaka, established the All India Muslim League, the first Muslim political party of the Indian subcontinent. The party, which became the prime platform for Indian Muslims and led to the creation of Pakistan, was formed against the backdrop of political agitation by the Indian National Congress against the 1905 Partition of Bengal.

During the meeting at Israt Manzil, delegates debated the new name to be given to the political party. A party styled as All India Muslim Confederacy was discussed. But, in the process the name All India Muslim League, proposed by Nawab Sir Khwaja Salimullah Bahadur and seconded by Hakim Ajmal Khan, was resolved in the meeting.

In 1912, a delegation led by Baron Hardinge of Penshurst, the Viceroy of India, met with Nawab Sir Khwaja Salimullah in Ishrat Manzil. During the meeting, Sir Salimullah demanded the establishment of a university for the mainly Muslim people of Eastern Bengal. The demands would eventually be realised with the establishment of the University of Dhaka in 1921.

The present day Madhur Canteen, situated in the northeastern part of the Arts Faculty compound of Dhaka University was the Jalsaghar of this garden-house. The floor and the spacious surrounding area of the building were covered with marbles. The building was also called 'Skating Pavilion' since members of the Nawab family used to skate there.
