= Meherbanu Khanam =

Bengali noblewoman and artist

- মেহেরবানু খানম
- Born: 1885; Ahsan Manzil, Dhaka, Bengal Presidency, British India (now in Bangladesh)
- Died: 3 October 1925 (aged 39–40)
- Known for: Painting
- Children: Khwaja Ajmal
- Family: Dhaka Nawab family

Meherbanu Khanam (Bengali: মেহেরবানু খানম; 1885 – 3 October 1925) was an artist and noblewoman in Bengal of Kashmiri ancestry. She was the daughter of Nawab Sir Khwaja Ahsanullah Bahadur and his wife Nawab Begum Kamrunnesa.

== Early life ==
Khanam was born on 1885 in Ahsan Manzil, Dhaka, Bengal Presidency, British Raj to the Dhaka Nawab family. Her father was the Nawab of Dhaka Khwaja Ahsanullah and her half-brother was Nawab Khwaja Salimullah was the next Nawab of Dhaka. Her mother was Kamrunnesa Bibi (died 22 June 1900), one of the wives of Khwaja Ahsanullah. She was home schooled like most nobility in Bengal. In 1902 she was married to Khwaja Mohammad Azam.

== Career ==
Khanam send her paintings to The Moslem Bharat, a monthly magazine, where it was seen by Kazi Nazrul Islam, the future national poet of Bangladesh. Kazi Nazrul Islam being inspired by the painting wrote a poem, Kheyaparer Tarani. The paintings was published by the magazine along with the poem in the July–August 1920 edition. It was the first time a painting of a Muslim woman was published. Khanam opened Kamrunnessa Girls' High School in Dhaka with her sisters Akhtarbanu and Paribanu. The school was named after her mother. She patronized Jadu, a monthly Urdu magazine.

== Death ==
Khanam died on 3 October 1925 in Dhaka, East Bengal, British Raj.
