= Hasina (disambiguation) =

Hasina is a female Arabic given name meaning chaste, virtuous. It is also used as a surname.

It may refer to:

== People ==
=== Female ===
- Sheikh Hasina, Bangladeshi politician and former prime minister
- Hasina Murshed, Bengali politician
- Hasina Miya, Nepalese politician

=== Male ===
- Ny Hasina Andriamanjato, Malagasy politician

== Other ==
- Hasina (film), a 2004 Indian film
- Hasina (Madagascar), the concepts of personal sanctity, sanctification and imbued authority in the traditional cultures of Madagascar

== See also ==
- Haseena (disambiguation)
