= Pir Yemeni =

Personal life
- Born: Yemen
- Died: 1509 Bengal
- Resting place: Mazar-e-Pir Yameni, Abdul Ghani Road, Dhaka, Bangladesh
- Other names: Shaykh Malik, Malek Shah

Religious life
- Religion: Islam

Muslim leader
- Post: Sufi saint

Shaykh Malik (Arabic: شَيْخ مَلِك, Bengali: শেখ মালেক), popularly known as Pir Yemeni (পীর ইয়েমেনী, پیر یمنی) was a pir who lived in Bengal.

== History ==
Yemeni decided to leave his home country of Yemen to propagate Islam in the Indian subcontinent.

It has been claimed that he met Shah Jalal at the khanqah of Nizamuddin Auliya in Delhi and then took part alongside him in the 1303 Conquest of Sylhet. Following the successful conquest, Yemeni and Shah Balkhi were sent to preach Islam in Dhaka by Shah Jalal. The two men established a khanqah in Dhaka. It was situated in close proximity to the present Secretariat Buildings of the Government of Bangladesh.

However, it has been noted in Yemeni's mazar (mausoleum) that he died in 915 Hijri which corresponds to 1509–1510, roughly two hundred years after the conquest in the Sylhet region. In the 19th century, the erstwhile Nawab of Dhaka Khwaja Ahsanullah renovated his tomb, near which a mosque was built. The establishments are situated on the northeastern side of Osmani Udyan on Abdul Ghani road. The nearby "Pir Yameni Market" takes its name from the pir.
