= Khwaja Yusuf Jan =

Nawab Khan Bahadur Khwaja Yusuf Jan
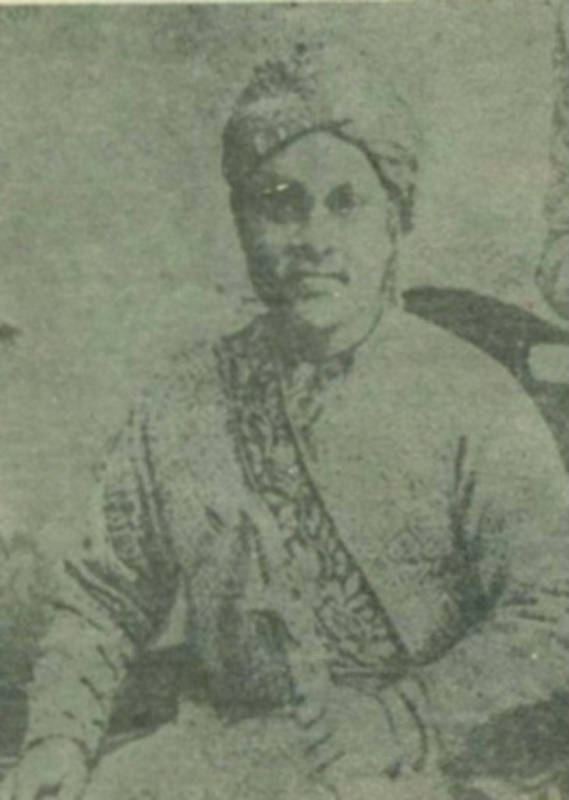
- Born: 21 January 1850; Dacca, Bengal Presidency, British India
- Died: 8 November 1923 (aged 73); Dacca, Bengal Presidency, British India
- Spouse: Nurjahan Khanam
- Children: Khwaja Muhammad Afzal
- Parents: Khwaja Abdul Mahdi (father); Hosaini Bibi (mother)
- Relatives: Khwaja Alimullah (maternal-grandfather); Khwaja Abdul Ghani (maternal-uncle)

Nawab Khan Bahadur Khwaja Yusuf Jan (21 January 1850 – 8 November 1923), was a Kashmiri-Bengali politician and member of Dhaka Nawab family.

== Early life ==
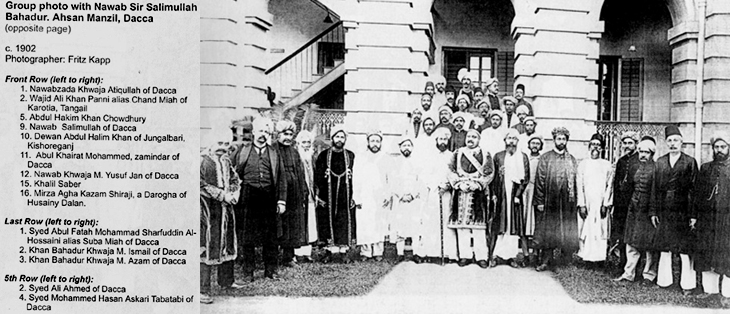
Jan pictured with the Muslim elite of Dacca.

Jan was born on 21 January 1850 to a Kashmiri Muslim family in Dhaka, Bengal Presidency, British India. He studied Arabic, Urdu, Persian, and English from home tutors. He organized the Mohammedan Association in 1883.

== Career ==
From 1884 to 1923, Jan served as a member of Dhaka Municipality. From 1897 to 1901, he was the chairman of Dhaka Municipality. He served as the vice chairman of Dhaka District Board from 1897 to 1905. In 1903, he was awarded Certificate of Honor, in 1904 Khan Bahadur and in 1910 Nawab by the British Government. In 1905, he attended a meeting in Northbrook Hall led by Nawab Bahadur Sir Khwaja Salimullah, where the Mohammedan Association was transformed into the Mohammedan Provincial Union.

Jan was made the secretary of the union. From 1901 to 1905 he was the vice chairman of Dhaka Municipality, and he served as the chairman of Dhaka Municipality between 1905 and 1916. On 16 October 1910, he presided over the meeting of the Muslim League in Bengal. Jan supported the partition of Bengal. In 1913, a market in Naya Bazar was named after him. He was the chairman of the district board from 1921 to 1923. He served in the East Bengal Legislative assembly from 1907. He served as the Honorary magistrate of Dhaka for 28 years. Jan was the secretary of Lady Duffrein Hospital, Dhaka.

== Personal life and death ==
Jan was married to Nurjahan Khanam and they had a son, Khwaja Muhammad Afzal.

Jan died on 8 November 1923 in Dhaka.
