= Khwaja Zakiuddin =

Bengali politician

- Born: 9 January 1918
- Died: 16 January 2003 (aged 85); Karachi, Pakistan
- Education: University of Dhaka; University College, London
- Spouses: Begum Binoo (m. 1943)
- Children: Yasmeen Murshed; Almas Zakiuddin; Zahed Zakiuddin
- Parents: Khwaja Shahabuddin (father); Farhat Banu (mother)
- Relatives: Khwaja Wasiuddin (brother)

Khwaja Zakiuddin (9 January 1918 – 16 January 2003) was a Bengali aristocrat and Pakistani statesman. He was a member of the Dhaka Nawab family.

== Early life ==
Zakiuddin was born on 9 January 1918. His father was Khwaja Shahabuddin, a Pakistan government Minister, and his mother was Farhat Banu, a member of the Bengal Legislative Assembly. He graduated from the University of Dhaka and then went to University College, London. He survived the London Blitz during World War II.

== Career ==
After returning from London Zakiuddin joined the Grindlays Bank in Bombay in 1943. He was one of the first Indian Muslims to be employed in a British Bank in India. He worked in Grindlays Bank branches in Kolkata, Karachi, and Peshawar. He joined the State Bank of Pakistan in the 1950s. He retired in 1976.

== Personal life ==
Zakiuddin married Begum Binoo on 11 October 1943. She was a daughter of Khan Bahadur Hafizur Rahman Chowdhury and Abida Khatoon. Zakiuddin and Binoo had two daughters Yasmeen Murshed, and Almas Zakiuddin and one son, Zahed Zakiuddin. Yasmeen served as the ambassador of Bangladesh to Pakistan. Zakiuddin's brother, Khwaja Wasiuddin, was a Lieutenant General of Bangladesh Army.

== Death ==
Zakiuddin died on 16 January 2003 in Karachi, Pakistan.
