= Khwaja Muhammad Afzal =

Indian poet

- Born: 1875; Dacca, Bengal Presidency
- Died: 1940 (aged 64–65); Dacca, Bengal Presidency
- Occupation: Poet
- Parents: Khwaja Yusuf Jan (father); Nurjahan Khanam (mother)

Khwaja Muhammad Afzal (1875–1940) was an Urdu poet in East Bengal, British India.

== Early life ==
In 1875, Afzal was born into the Dhaka Nawab family. His father was Khwaja Yusuf Jan. He received formal education in English and Persian. He studied poetry under Syed Mahmud Azad, a Dhaka-based poet.

== Career ==
Afzal wrote poetry in Urdu and Persian and used Afzal as his pen name. He wrote a Diwan, which is an Islamic traditional collection of poetry, and a number of Ghazals in Urdu. He used the Abjad writing system to publish three volumes of a history book. After the death of Khwaja Ahsanullah, he published the Gam-e-ma-paikar in the Abjad writing system. Between 1895 and 1933, he regularly kept a diary, which is now preserved in the library of the University of Dhaka.
