= Yasmeen Murshed =

Bangladeshi businesswoman and politician (1945–2025)

- ইয়াসমিন মোর্শেদ

High Commissioner of Bangladesh to Pakistan
- In office 27 December 2007 – 23 November 2009
- Preceded by: F. A. Shamim Ahmed
- Succeeded by: Suhrab Hossain

Adviser to the Caretaker Government
- In office 31 October 2006 – 11 January 2007

Personal details
- Born: Yasmeen Zakiuddin; 19 May 1945 Calcutta, Bengal Province, British India
- Died: 31 July 2025 (aged 80) Dhaka, Bangladesh
- Spouse: Syed Tanweer Murshed
- Children: 2
- Parents: Khwaja Zakiuddin (father); Begum Binoo (mother)
- Relatives: Hasina Murshed (mother-in-law); See Dhaka Nawab Family
- Education: University of the Punjab

Yasmeen Murshed (19 May 1945 – 31 July 2025) was a Bangladeshi businesswoman who was the founder of Scholastica School and an adviser of the caretaker government led by President Iajuddin Ahmed.

== Background and education ==
Yasmeen Zakiuddin was born on 19 May 1945 to Khwaja Zakiuddin and Begum Binoo in Calcutta in the then Bengal Province, British India. Her grandfather, Khawaja Shahabuddin, was the governor of Northwest Frontier Province of Pakistan and served as a Minister in the Cabinet of Pakistan. Her grandmother, Farhat Banu, was a member of the Bengal Legislative Assembly elected in 1937. Her mother's family originated from Bogra and her maternal uncle, Habibur Rahman, was a member of the Pakistan cabinet in the 1960s.

Murshed had her early education at the Viqarunnisa Noon School in Dhaka. She earned her bachelor's degree in English and master's in economics in 1969 at the University of the Punjab during her husband's posting in Lahore and Islamabad.

== Career ==
Murshed founded Scholastica School in 1977. She was the founding chairperson of Scholastica, and chairperson of the store Etcetera Bangladesh. She was also a founding trustee of the Independent University, Bangladesh (IUB) and a member of its governing council. Furthermore, she also held the position of director at the United Insurance Company Ltd and Chittagong Stock Exchange Ltd.

Murshed was in charge of the Ministry of Women and Children Affairs, the Ministry of Primary and Mass Education and the Ministry of Social Welfare from 31 October 2006 to 11 January 2007. In 2007, she was made the High Commissioner of Bangladesh to Pakistan.

== Personal life and death ==
Murshed was married to Syed Tanweer Murshed (d. 1988), the youngest son of Syed Manzoor Murshed and Begum Hasina Murshed. Tanweer was a nephew of the Chief Justice of the then East Pakistan High Court, Syed Mahbub Murshed. With Tanweer, Murshed had two children, Syed Maher Murshed and Syeda Madiha Murshed.

Murshed died at the United Hospital in Dhaka, on 31 July 2025, at the age of 80. She was buried at the Banani graveyard.
