= Federation Hall, Kolkata =

Nationalist organization of India

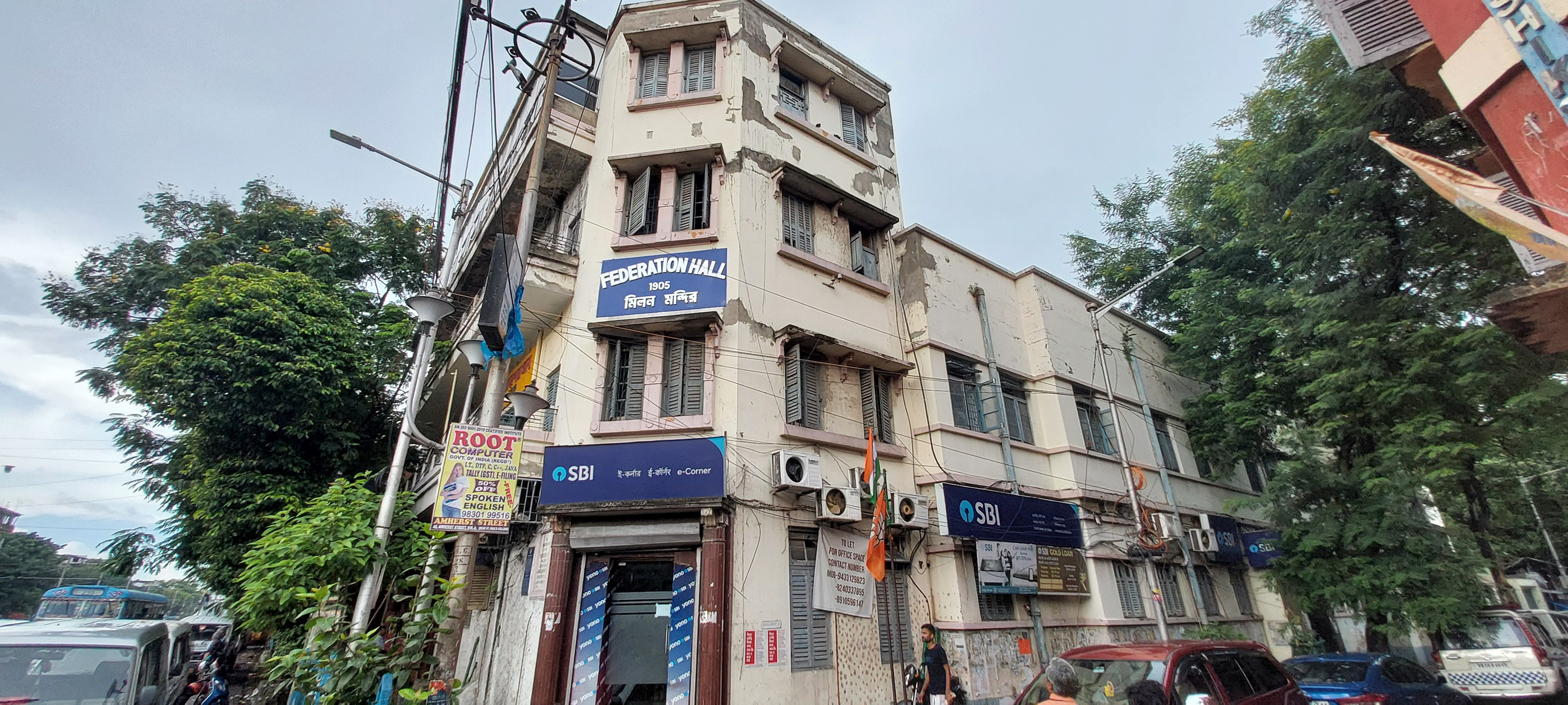
Federation Hall at APC road in Kolkata

Federation Hall is a historical heritage building and nationalist institution of British India, situated at APC Road in Kolkata, West Bengal. The Federation Hall society was founded in 1905. Sister Nivedita proposed the name of the hall as Milan Mandir.

== History ==
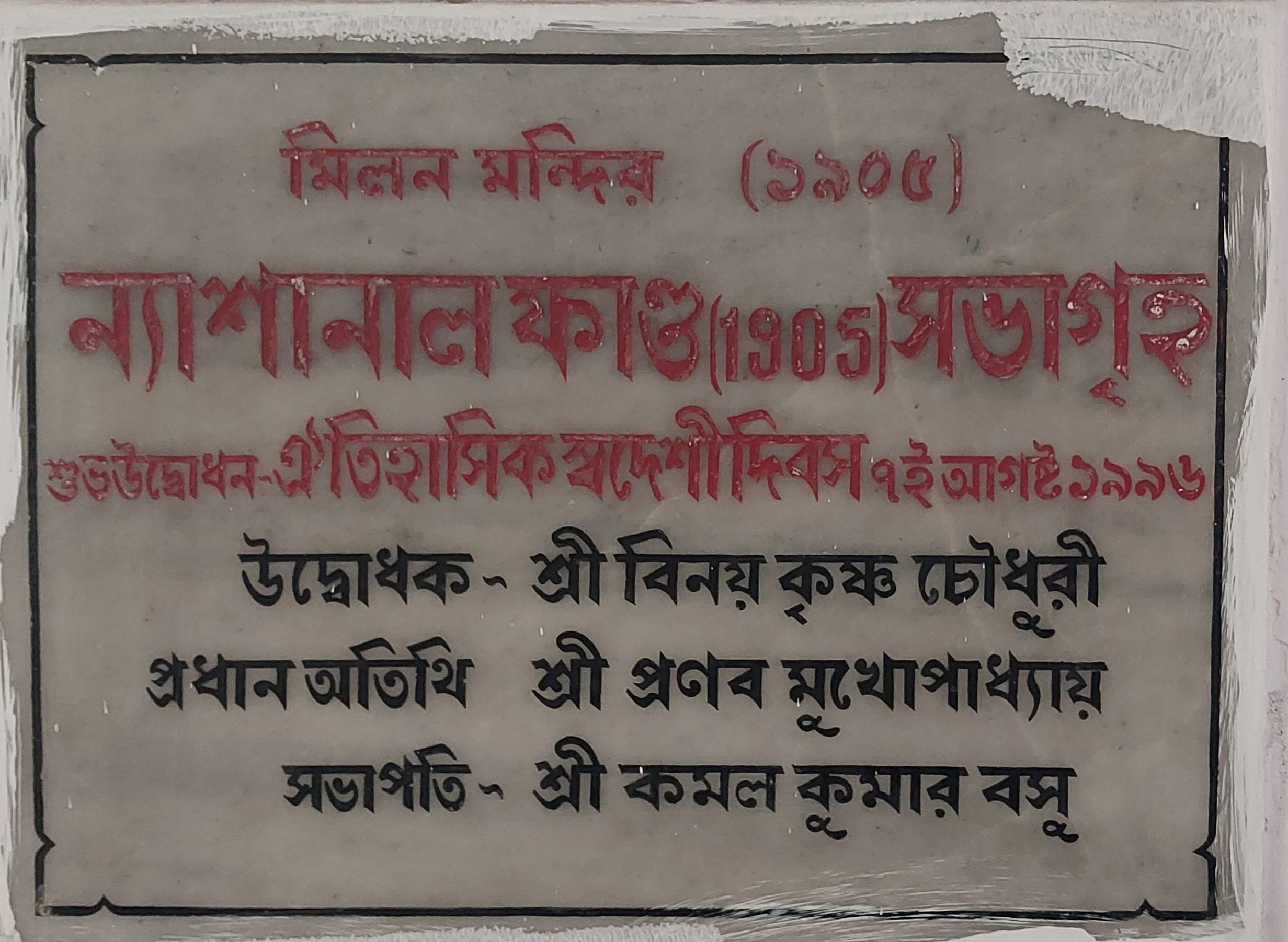
The anniversary plaque of Federation Hall

While Lord Curzon proposed the Partition of Bengal in 1905, Bengali nationalist figures like Surendra Nath Banerjee, Rabindranath Tagore, Jagadish Chandra Bose, Taraknath Palit, and Ananda Mohan Bose formed this educational, cultural, and socio-political organisation. It was founded on 16 October 1905 in Kolkata on Raksha Bandhan ceremony. The anti-partition movement was vastly organised by the society all over Bengal. Acharya P.C. Ray, Rashbehari Ghosh, Bipin Chandra Pal, Manindra Chandra Nandi, Sir Gooroodas Banerjee, Bhupendra Nath Basu, Ashwini Kumar Dutta, Krishna Kumar Mitra, Brahmabandhav Upadhyay, Khwaja Atiqullah of Dacca, Abdul Halim Gaznavi, and Nilratan Sircar were also associated with the philanthropist society.
