= Alamgir M. A. Kabir =

Bangladeshi politician

- Born: 25 November 1911
- Died: 10 January 1996 (aged 84)
- Spouse: Tahera Kabir
- Awards: Independence Day Award (1978)

Alamgir M. A. Kabir (25 November 1911 – 10 January 1996) was a Bangladeshi police officer and recipient of the Independence Award (1978).

== Early life ==
Kabir was born on 25 November 1911. He was the son of Khan Bahadur A.K. Kabiruddin and Sajeda Khandker. He had two older brothers, Humayun Kabir and Jehangir Kabir. He was married to Tahera Kabir, daughter of Khwaja Shahabuddin. His daughters were Alpha, Khushi Kabir, and Sigma Huda; one son Babar Kabir.

== Career ==
Kabir joined the Indian Police, Bengal Cadre in 1932. He decided to join the Pakistan police after the Partition of India. In the 1960s he was promoted to the rank of Inspector General of Police. After the Independence of Bangladesh, he joined the Bangladesh Police. He founded Polwell Market for the welfare of police officers. He was involved in family planning in Bangladesh and founded the Family Planning Association of Bangladesh. In 1993 he founded Human Development Foundation. He received the Independence Award for his role in population control in 1978. He was an adviser, with the rank of minister, of Shahabuddin Ahmed caretaker government.

== Death and legacy ==
Kabir died on 10 January 1996. SWID Alamgir MA Kabir Auditorium of SWID-Bangladesh is named after him.
