= Haseena =

Haseena may refer to:

== Given name ==
- Haseena Begum (born 1961), Pakistani politician
- Haseena Haneef, known as Usha, Indian actress
- Haseena Khan, Bangladeshi scientist and professor
- Haseena Moin (1941–2021), Pakistani playwright and writer for radio and television
- Haseena Malik, a fictional character in the TV series Maddam Sir

== Other uses ==
- Haseena (film), a 2018 Indian Hindi-language film
- Haseena: The Queen Of Mumbai, a 2017 Indian biographical by Apoorva Lakhia
- Haseena, a 1998 album by Lesle Lewis

== See also ==
- The dictionary definition of hasina at Wiktionary
- Hasina (disambiguation)
