= Shamsunnahar Khwaja Ahsanullah =

Bangladeshi politician (1934–2025)

- শামসুন্নাহার খাজা আহসানউল্লাহ

Member of Parliament Women's Seat-21
- In office 27 February 1991 – 15 February 1996
- Succeeded by: Sagufta Yasmin Emily

Member of Parliament Women's Seat-17
- In office 10 October 2001 – 29 October 2006
- Preceded by: Sagufta Yasmin Emily
- Succeeded by: Farida Rahman

Personal details
- Born: 21 September 1934 Narayanganj, Bengal Presidency, British India
- Died: 12 April 2025 (aged 90) Gulshan, Dhaka, Bangladesh
- Party: Bangladesh Nationalist Party
- Spouse: Nawabzada Khwaja Ahsanullah
- Relatives: Khwaja Salimullah (father-in-law); See Dhaka Nawab Family
- Occupation: Politician

Nawab Begum Shamsunnahar Khwaja Ahsanullah (21 September 1934 – 12 April 2025) was a Bangladeshi politician from the Bangladesh Nationalist Party, who was a two-term Jatiya Sangsad member from the women's reserved seats. She was the wife of Nawabzada Khwaja Ahsanullah of the Dhaka Nawab family.

== Career ==
Begum Ahsanullah was one of the founding members of the JAGODAL, the principal predecessor of the Bangladesh Nationalist Party. She joined it on the special request of then President Ziaur Rahman and subsequently became a founding member of the BNP. Begum Ahsanullah also helped found the Bangladesh Jatiotabadi Mohila Dal, the women's wing of the BNP. During the anti-Ershad Movement, she led the party and stood beside Begum Khaleda Zia. She was later selected to the parliament in 1991 as a candidate of the Bangladesh Nationalist Party. She was re-elected in 1996, the 6th parliamentary election of Bangladesh. The general elections were scrapped and another election was called over concerns of fairness in 1996. She was elected to the reserved seats for women in parliament by the Bangladesh Nationalist Party on 5 September 2005. She was an adviser to the Bangladesh Union Sadasya Sangstha. In 2008, she along with 86 other former Bangladesh Nationalist Party leaders expressed their support for party General Secretary Khandaker Delwar Hossain and Chairperson Khaleda Zia during the caretaker government rule in Bangladesh. Begum Ahsanullah retired from politics after the 2006–2008 Bangladesh political crisis.

Along with being a politician, Ahsanullah served as the president of the Salimullah Orphanage since her husband's death in 1978. She resigned from her post as president in 2010.

== Personal life ==
Begum Ahsanullah was married to Nawabzada Khwaja Ahsanullah (1915–1978) of the Dhaka Nawab family. She was the daughter-in-law of the Nawab of Dhaka, Sir Khwaja Salimullah. She has two daughters: Fawzia and Ayesha; and one son; Nawabzada Khwaja Zaki Ahsanullah.

=== Death ===
Begum Ahsanullah died on 12 April 2025 in her Gulshan residence in Dhaka. She was 90. Her death was officially condoled by the BNP, with the party's secretary-general Mirza Fakhrul Islam Alamgir issuing an official condolence letter. She left behind her three children, numerous grandchildren and great-grandchildren. Upon her death, she was the senior-most member of the Dhaka Nawab Family and the last living member of Nawab Salimullah's children's generation. She was buried in the Nawab family graveyard in Begum Bazaar, Old Dhaka.
