= Nawab of Dhaka =

Royalty title in Bangladesh

- Coat of Arms
- Creation date: 1780
- First holder: Khwaja Abdul Ghani
- Last holder: Khwaja Hassan Askari
- Status: Extinct
- Extinction date: 1952
- Seats: Ahsan Manzil, Dhaka

The Nawab of Dhaka (Bengali: "ঢাকার নবাব"), originally spelt in English Nawab of Dacca, was the title of the head of one of the largest Muslim zamindari in British Bengal and Assam, based in present-day Dhaka, Bangladesh. The title of nawab, similar to the British peerage, was conferred upon the head of the family by Queen Victoria as a recognition of the first Nawab's loyalty and contribution to the social welfare activities.

Although the Nawabs of Dhaka were not sovereigns, they played an essential role in the politics of South Asia—and the relations with external entities. The family was proprietary of the Dhaka Nawab estate, seated at Ahsan Manzil palace. "Nawab of Dhaka" was the title of the head of the family from 1843. Khwaja Alimullah was the first holder of the title, and Khwaja Abdul Ghani was the first Nawab of Dhaka when the title was made hereditary by Queen Victoria.

Considerable infighting within the Nawab's family gradually led to the decline of the estate. In 1952, the East Pakistan Estates Acquisition Act formally abolished the estate. Khwaja Habibullah Khan Bahadur was the last Nawab of Dhaka to hold the office. Successive land reform in Pakistan and Bangladesh brought an end to the remaining landholdings of the Nawab family.

== History ==
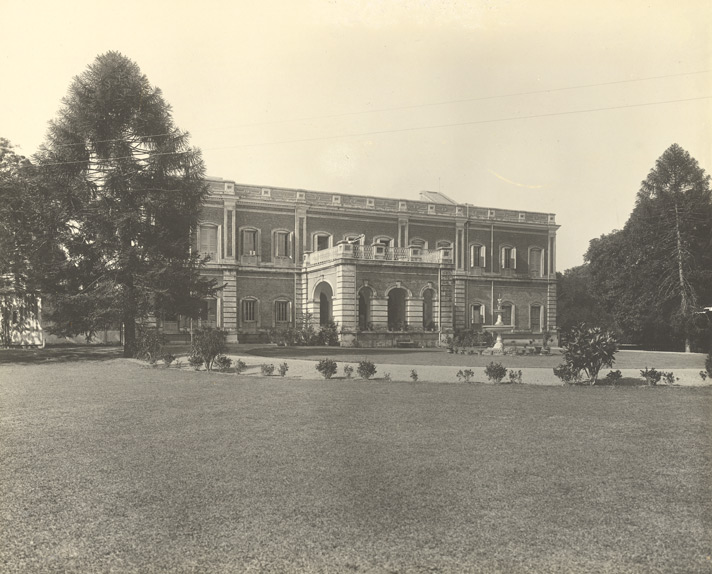
Nawab's Dilkusha Garden, Dhaka (1904) by Fritz Kapp.

The Nawabs of Dhaka were Persian and Urdu-speaking aristocrats tracing their ancestry to Kashmiri merchants of Persian origin who arrived in Mughal Bengal during the reign of emperor Muhammad Shah to pursue trade, but eventually settled in the districts of Dhaka, Sylhet and Bakerganj. Following Nader Shah’s 1739 sack of Delhi, Khwaja Abdul Hakim —who had held a prominent imperial appointment at the Mughal court and served as governor of Kashmir— withdrew to Sylhet, where he established a mercantile enterprise and invited his family from Kashmir. Upon his death, his brother Maulvi Khwaja Abdullah Kashmiri moved to Dhaka, becoming the first patriarch of the family in the city.

The Dhaka Nawab family was officially established by Khwaja Hafizullah Kashmiri son of Khawaja Abdullah Kashmiri, who acquired considerable wealth via trade in leather and gold. His fortune was built upon trading leather, spices, and salt with Greek and Armenian merchants. He also purchased some floundering zamindari estates, on sale everywhere in Bengal under Permanent Settlement, and indigo factories in Barisal District and Mymensingh District. In the following years, they married into renowned families in the locality to strengthen their hold over the newly acquired territories, most notably the zamindari families of Karatia and Kartikpur, whose estates had been established through Mughal imperial firmans and whose local influence made them key partners in the governance of eastern Bengal.

Hafizullah acquired Atia Pargana in the former Mymensingh District (currently in the Tangail District). Hafizullah bought a 4-anna (one fourth) share of the pargana, including Dhamrai, the Atia Mosque built in 1608, and much of Madhupur forest in 1806, on the strength of a mortgage bond for Rs. 40,000. Profits gained from this purchase compelled him to engage further in the purchasing of land properties. He also acquired Aila Phuljhuri in the Bakarganj Sundarbans, a 44,000 acres (180 km^{2}) area bought for Rs 21000 in 1812, at a revenue demand of only Rs 372 annually. After clearing of the jungle was affected, in the late 1870s, its estimated total rental income appeared as high as Rs 2,20,502.

Due to an absence of any surviving male successor of Hafizullah, his estate upon his death descended to his nephew Khwaja Alimullah, son of his deceased elder brother Ahsanullah, whom he had groomed as an estate manager. His landed acquisitions were added to those of his uncle, consequently making the united zamindari as one of the largest in the province. Before his death in 1854, Alimullah made a waqf for a united status of the zamindari which was to be managed jointly by a mutawalli.

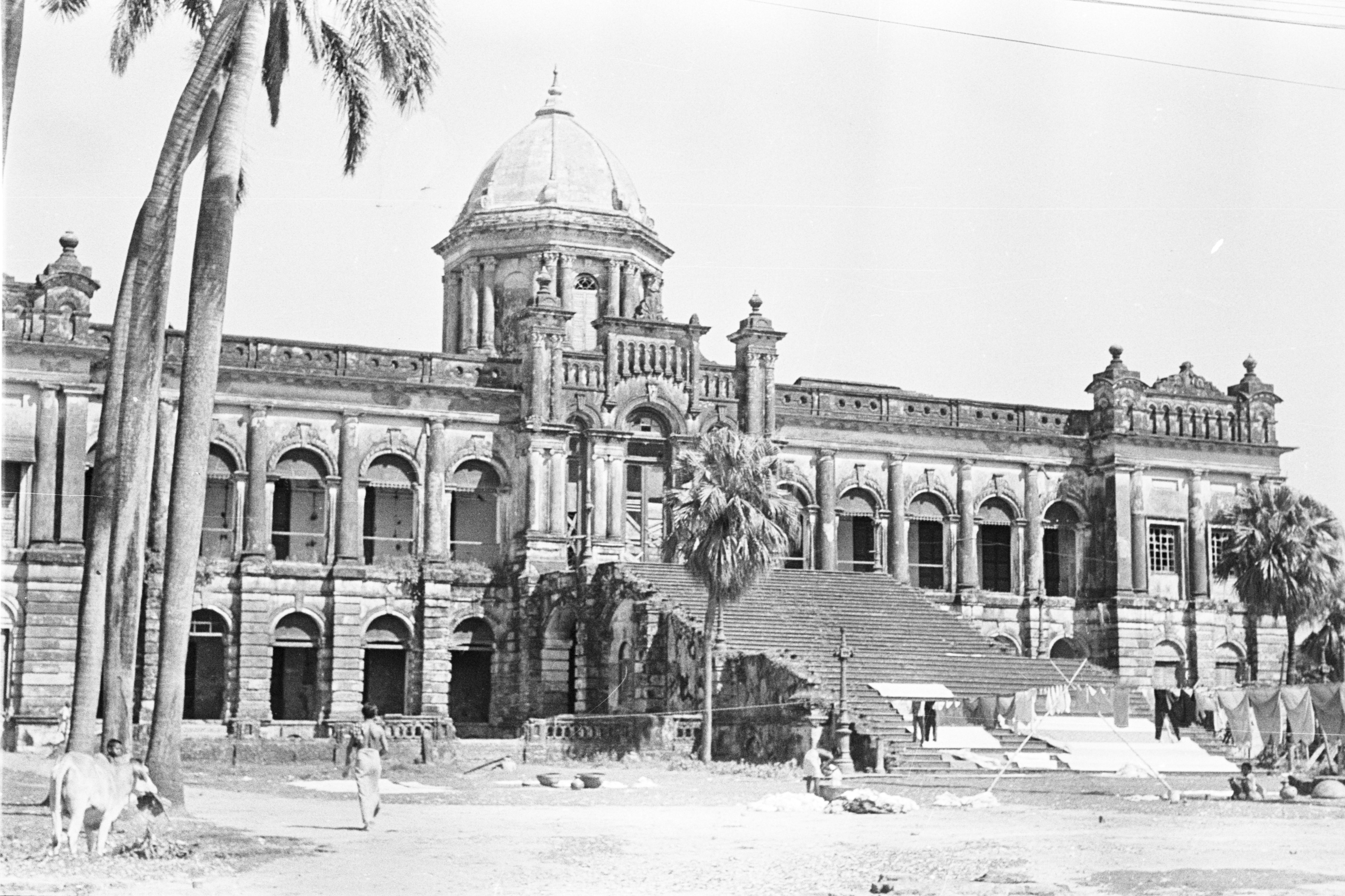
Ahsan Manzil palace in 1965

His nephew, Khwaja Alimullah, who was the third son of Khwaja Ahsanullah, is reported to have been an enterprising member of the clan, effectively laying the foundation upon which successive heads of the family established their prosperity and power. He purchased Ahsan Manzil, which was then a French trading house. He had learnt English and encouraged members of his family to learn English, in addition to forging alliances with Englishmen by mixing with them freely. He had partaken in development work for the Dhaka Municipality, and with the aid of the British, he set up the Ramna Race course. He bought thoroughbreds for his race course and established the Gymkhana Club. He purchased the famous diamond, Daria-i-Noor (Dhaka) at a government auction in 1852, held by Hamilton and Company of Calcutta. The diamond was initially exhibited at The Great Exhibition in Hyde Park but failed to sell for a desirable price, and was resultantly sent back to India. The other more famous diamond, also called Daria-i-Noor is presently being held in a vault of the Central Bank of Iran in Tehran.

In 1846 he made a Waqfnama in favour of his second son Khwaja Abdul Ghani, and made him a powerful Mutawalli (Manager) for the management of all the properties of the family. This aided in preserving the family wealth, as it could not be divided amongst descendants. That Waqfnama was the main key responsible for the future success of the family. Despite being a Sunni Muslim himself, Khwaja Alimullah financed the Muharram Festival of the Shia Muslims in Dhaka. He started in 1843 after the death of Ghaziuddin Haider who was the Naib Nazim of Dhaka. He died in 1854 and was buried in the Begum Bazar graveyard.

Khwaja Abdul Ghani, son of Khwaja Alimullah and Zinat Begum, was rendered the Mutawalli of the estate. On the succession of Khwaja Abdul Ghani to the management that the prosperity of the house reached its zenith. Under him the land control of the family was extended to many parganas in the districts of Dhaka, Bakerganj, Tripura, and Mymensingh. For management he split the zamindari into 26 sub-circles, each governed by a kachari (office) headed by a naib (manager) with a number of amlas (officials). He was vested with the personal title of Nawab in 1875, which was made a hereditary title by Queen Victoria on 1 January 1877.

With Khwaja Abdul Ghani the Khwaja family for the first time developed interest in the politics and social works of the country. He also organised Dhaka people into panchayet mahallas, which was endorsed by the British Raj in consideration of his support to the Raj during the Sepoy Mutiny. Nawab Abdul Ghani made several contributions towards benevolent and charitable work, not only in the city and elsewhere in Bengal but also beyond the Indian subcontinent. His most conspicuous public act was the water works system in Dhaka city. The filtered water was supplied free of charge to the people of Dhaka. In addition he established a number of schools, madrasas and donated funds for the Mitford hospital in Dhaka, Kolkata Medical College and Aligarh College. He supported women to act in dramas in spite of the opposition of leaders of the conservative society. At the beginning of the Christian era, each year, he arranged a grand fair in Shahbagh Garden, and maintained a Portuguese Band to entertain guests on festive occasions. He oversaw and financed the construction of Buckland Bund.

Nawab Abdul Ghani handed over the responsibility of the Dhaka Nawab Estate to his eldest son, Khwaja Ahsanullah on 11 September 1868, but continued to supervise the estate until his death on 24 August 1896. Khwaja Ahsanullah was born in Dhaka in the year 1846. He was an Urdu-Persian poet and his pen name was "Shaheen". His selected poems, Kulliyat-e-Shaheen is preserved at Dhaka University. His book, Tarikh-e-Khandan-e-Kashmiriyah is a vital addition to Urdu-Persian literature and history. Both father and son had the title of Nawab conferred upon them in 1875, and in 1877, this title was made hereditary for the eldest member of the line.

"Nawab Ahsanullah established the Ahsanullah School of Engineering, and being thoughtful of the health of the residents of Dhaka he, along with his father, contributed towards the establishment of a water tank from which filtered water would be supplied to the citizens of Dhaka as far back as 1874.

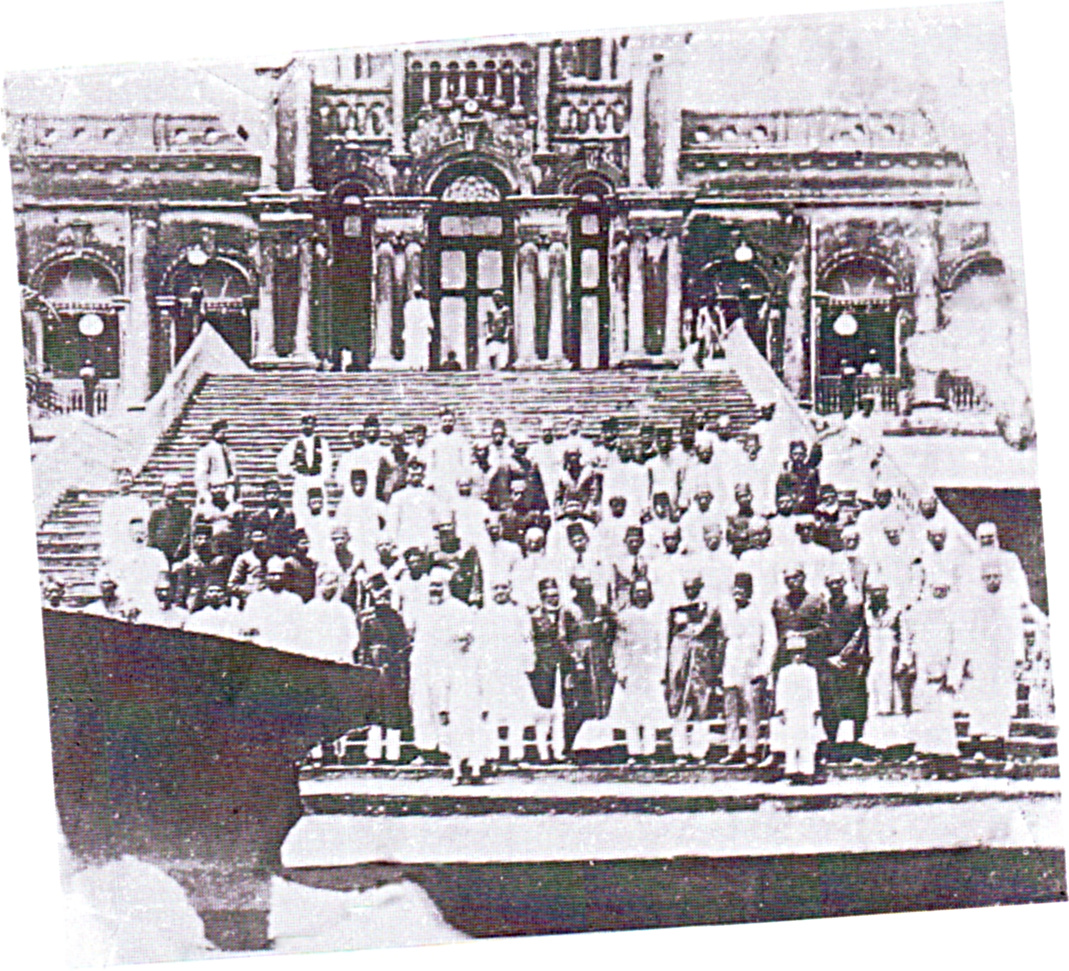
Nawab Sir Salimullah celebrating the Eid Day with his family at the Ahsan Manzil palace

Nawab Salimullah, the second son of Ahsanullah took up the management of the zamindari in 1902. But soon family feuds started and Salimullah lost the grip on the estate. The estate management deteriorated to the extent of rising revenue arrears and estate debts. For political considerations, the government backed up Nawab Salimullah financially, which included a confidential official loan to Salimullah (1912) to clear up his personal debts. Nawab Salimullah of Dhaka and the Muslim aristocrats who formed the bulwark of the Muslim League in 1906 inspired Muslim peasants against the Swadeshi movement (1905–1911) in support of Partition of Bengal. Together with Nawab Ali Chowdhury, he was instrumental in initiating A. K. Fazlul Huq into politics, who isolated Muslim League from peasants and defeated Sir Khwaja Nazimuddin at the Patuakhali Constituency in the election of 1937. Dhaka Nawab Family, together with the Ispahanis of Kolkata still kept a firm grip on a majority of Muslim students while the Bengal chapter of the All India Muslim Students Association was renamed as All Bengal Muslim Students League in 1938.

The tottering Dhaka Nawab Estate was brought under the Court of Wards in September 1907. The first steward of the Estate was HCF Meyer who was followed by LG Pillen, PJ Griffith, and PD Martin, all members of the Indian civil service. On 16 December 1901, while he was posted in Mymensingh, he received a telegram informing him of the demise of his father, and on his arrival in Dhaka the next morning, as the eldest son, and with the "unanimous consent of all parties concerned" was installed as the new Nawab. Nawab Salimullah was a great educational reformer, and like his father, was inclined to prodigal liberality. He was a great philanthropist, rendering financial assistance to many poor students, and established the largest orphanage of undivided Bengal, which was named "Salimullah Muslim Orphanage". For the benefit of Muslim students he donated the well-known "Salimullah Muslim Hall" in Dhaka, which was then the largest residential Hall in any Asian University.

Nawab Sir Salimuilah is mainly remembered today for three of his greatest achievements. Firstly, the part he played in the partition of Bengal which was implemented on 16 October 1905, aimed at freeing the Bengali Muslims from the bondage of Hindu domination, and to secure their socio-economic progress by establishing a separate Muslim majority province; secondly, for being the founder of such a strong political party as the All India Muslim League in December 1906, and the establishment of Dhaka University in 1912.

As has so often happened in the great families of India, after five generations of splendour, the Nawab Family now entered on a period of decline. Extravagant living and the necessity of maintaining an ever-increasing number of dependents were the main causes of the trouble, but to them must be added, the considerable sums spent by Nawab Ahsanullah and Nawab Salimuilah on public service or pro-Partition propaganda. The family was heavily in debt and in view of the political importance of the family, its estates were brought under the Court of Wards in 1909.

Nawab Salimullah was the first man of the Nawab Family of Dhaka to actively participate in politics. He is reported to have said that, his grandfather, Nawab Sir Abdul Ghani, and his father, Nawab Sir Khwaja .Ahsanullah, were men of international renown and were imbibed with the love of their country and people, but, they refrained from participating in politics. It was in his destiny to open the door to politics for the Nawab Family of Dhaka. Nawab Sir Salimullah died in Calcutta on 16 January 1915, and his coffin was brought to Dhaka by a special launch, and he was buried in the family graveyard in Begum Bazar."

In 1934, the family had estates that covered almost 1200 km^{2} and was well spread over different districts of Eastern Bengal, together with properties in Shillong, Assam, had a yearly rent of £120,000. With its wealth, social status and close relationship with the Raj, the family of the Nawab of Dacca was the single most powerful Muslim family in Bengal.

The Dhaka Nawab Estate was abolished in 1952 under the East Bengal Estate Acquisition and Tenancy Act (1950). Only the Ahsan Manzil complex and khas lands held under raiyati rights were exempted from the operation of the Acquisition Act. But due to many unresolved family claims many assets of the Estate were still controlled by the Court of Wards. The land reforms board, which is the successor of the Court of Wards, still holds those assets on behalf of the family.

The influence of Dhaka Nawab family on the Muslim Students League eroded after the partition, particularly after Muhammad Ali Jinnah's pronouncement on the state language issue in 1948. The anti-Khwaja faction of the Muslim League broke away from the All Bengal Muslim Students League, and established East Pakistan Muslim Students League in 1948. This Students League spearheaded the Language Movement that began that year.

== Brief genealogy ==
Khwaja Alimullah	Khwaja Abdul Ghani	Khwaja Ahsanullah	Khwaja Salimullah	Khwaja Habibullah

- Khwaja Abdul Kader Kashmiri
  - Khwaja Abdullah (d. 1796)
    - Khwaja Hafizullah (1735–1815)
    - Khwaja Ahsanullah
      - Khwaja Alimullah (1772–1854) First to assume the title of Nawab.
        - Khwaja Abdul Ghani (1813–1896) Second Nawab of Dhaka and first to assume the title of Nawab as hereditary.
          - Khwaja Ahsanullah (1846–1901) Third Nawab of Dhaka.
            - Khwaja Salimullah (1871–1915) Fourth Nawab of Dhaka.
              - Khwaja Habibullah (1895–1958) Fifth and last Nawab of Dhaka.
                - Khwaja Hassan Askari (1920–1984)
            - Bilqis Banu
              - Khawaja Nazimuddin (1894–1964) 2nd Prime Minister of Pakistan
              - Khwaja Shahabuddin (1898–1977), m. Farhat Banu
                - Tahera Kabir (d. 1980)
                - Khwaja Zakiuddin (1918–2003), m. Begum Binoo
                  - Yasmeen Murshed - Businesswoman and founder of Scholastica School
                  - Almas Zakiuddin
                  - Zahed Zakiuddin
                - Khwaja Wasiuddin (1920–1992)
            - Khwaja Atiqullah (1882–1945)
            - Meherbanu Khanam (1902–1954)
        - Hosaini Bibi
          - Khwaja Yusuf Jan (1850–1923) Politician.
            - Khwaja Muhammad Afzal (1875–1940) Poet.

=== Other prominent members of the family ===
- Khan Bahadur Khwaja M. Azam - Politician.
- Khan Bahadur Khwaja Ismail Zabih - Politician.
- Khwaja Nasrullah - Politician.
- Khwaja Nooruddin - Politician, journalist and owner of right wing English language newspaper published from Dhaka, The Morning News (Bangladeshi newspaper)
- Syed Khwaja Khairuddin - Politician and Mayor of Dhaka. Head of East Pakistan Muslim League.
- Khwaja Mohammed Kaiser - Diplomat.
- Begum Shamsunnahar Khwaja Ahsanullah, wife of Nawabzada Khwaja Ahsanullah (youngest son of Nawab Salimullah), former leader of the BNP, former BNP MP (1991–1995), 1996, 2001-2006
- Khwaja Ajmal - Sports organizer.
- Rumana Abdur - Lawyer

== Contributions ==
=== Literature ===
Beyond their administrative and landed influence, the Dhaka Nawabs and their extended kin played a vital role in sustaining Urdu and Persian language and literature in Bengal. Under the family's patronage, Dhaka remained an active center of Indo-Persian literary culture in the 19th and 20th centuries, fostering prominent poets and writers from within and beyond the lineage—including Nawab Ahsanullah (Shaheen), Khwaja Abdur Rahim (Saba), Khwaja Haider Jan (Shayek), Khwaja Asadullah (Kawkab), and Khwaja Abdul Ghaffar (Akhtar), Khwaja Atiqullah (Sayeda), Khwaja Muhammad Afzal and Sir Khwaja Nazimuddin KCIE, CIE.

The family maintained close connection with literary figures like Mahmud Azad and Hakim Habibur Rahman. Khwaja Muhammad Azam wrote Islami Panchayet Dhaka (1911) in Urdu. His son, Khwaja Muhammad Adel, co-edited Jadu, a monthly journal with Hakim Habibur Rahman. Khwaja Abdur Rahim Saba (d 1871) wrote Urdu poems. His manuscript, Daste Saba is preserved in the Dhaka University Library. Nawab Khwaja Ahsanullah wrote Urdu poems by his pen-name Shaheen collected in Kulliat-e-Shaheen, and a history of his family collected in Ta'arīkh-e-Khândan-e-Kashmirian. He was also a composer and lyricist of thumri songs, and a financier of Ahsanul Kasas (15 February 1884), an Urdu weekly magazine of Dhaka.

=== Photography ===
It was in the later part of the 19th century that the art of photography got its momentum in Dhaka under the patronage of Nawab Khwaja Ahsanullah and his son Nawab Khwaja Salimullah. Khwaja Ahsanullah joined the Calcutta-based Photographic Society of India in 1888.

=== Palaces of the Nawabs ===
1. Ahsan Manzil Palace
2. Israt Manzil Palace
3. Nishat Manzil Palace
4. Shahbag Garden House
5. Dilkusha, Dhaka
6. Paribagh Garden House
7. Baigunbari Park
8. Company Bagan
9. Farhat Manzil
10. Hafiz Manzil
11. Nilkuthi Mojibnagar
12. Mansur Castle
13. Islampur Nawab Bari

== Nawabbari Family Graveyard ==
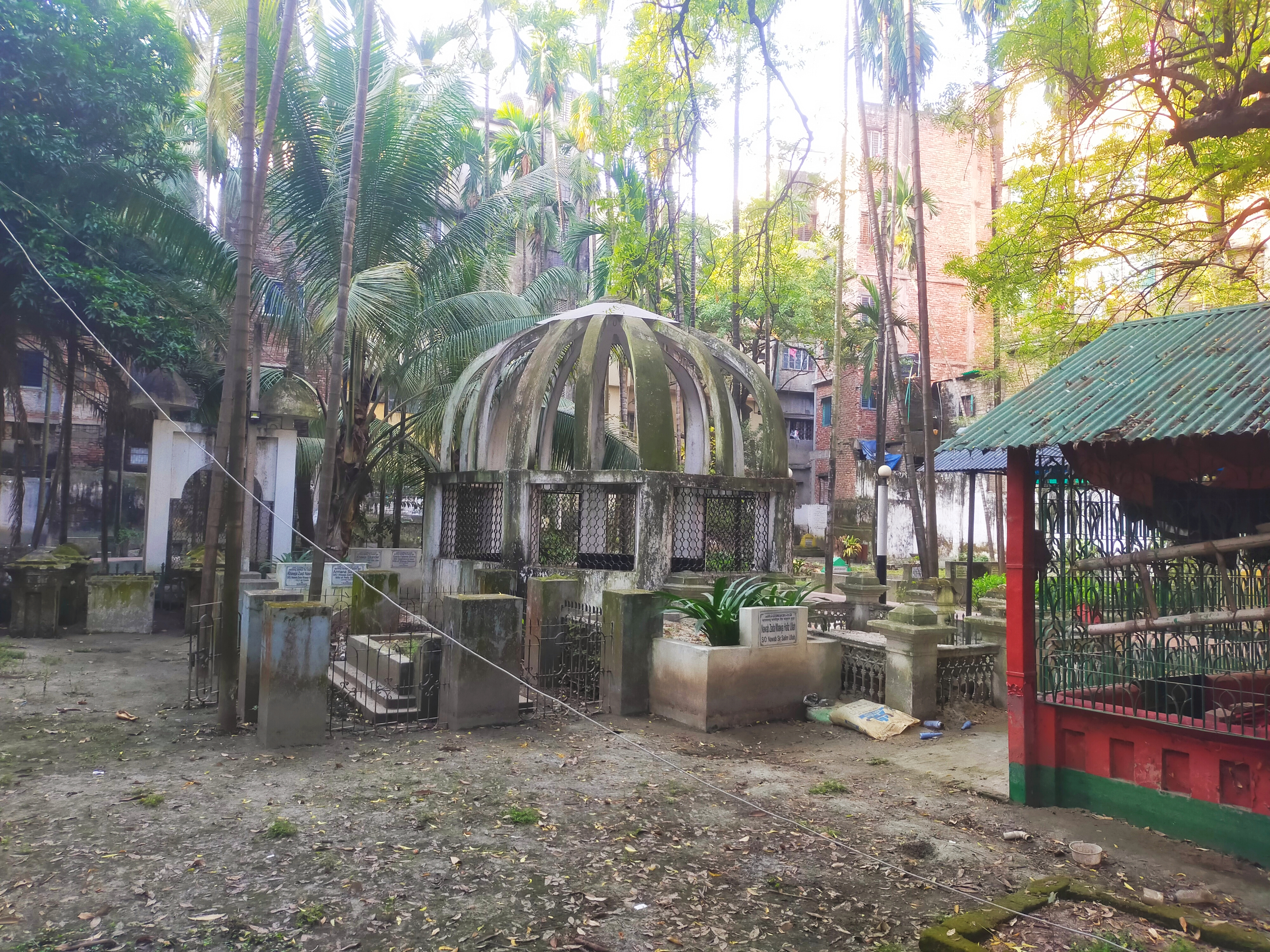
Nawabbari Family Graveyard. Grave of Nawab Salimullah in the Middle (domed structure) along with others grave.

The Nawabbari Family Graveyard is situated in Old Dhaka at Begum Bazar. This graveyard is the final resting place of Nawab Ahsanullah, Nawab Salimullah and other members of Nawab family.

== See also ==
- A. K. Fazlul Huq
- Huseyn Shaheed Suhrawardy
- Hakim Habibur Rahman
- Asiatic Society of Bangladesh
- Shahbag
- Dilkusha, Dhaka
- Khilafat Movement
- United Bengal Movement
- Bengali language movement
