= Hasina Murshed =

Bangladeshi politician

Member of the Bengal Legislative Assembly
- In office 1937–1945
- Succeeded by: Husan Ara Begum
- Constituency: Women's (Calcutta)

Personal details
- Spouse: Syed Manzoor Murshed
- Children: Syed Tanweer Murshed
- Relatives: Yasmeen Murshed (daughter-in-law)

Hasina Murshed was a Bengali politician, educationist, and a member of the Bengal Legislative Assembly.

== Family ==
Begum Hasina Murshed was married to Syed Manzoor Murshed. They had a son Syed Tanweer Murshed. Tanweer was married to Yasmeen Murshed, a member of Dhaka Nawab family.

She herself was a member of the Dhaka Nawab family as she was a daughter of Khwaja Habibullah, the fifth nawab of Dhaka.

== Career ==
Murshed was elected to the Bengal Legislative Assembly of British India in 1937. She was the first women parliamentary secretary of Bengal. Self-educated, she was one of the founders of Lady Brabourne College, the first college in Bengal for Muslim women and sat on its governing body. She was awarded the Most Excellent Order of the British Empire (MBE) by the British Raj. She was a member of the Coalition Party. In the Bengal Legislative Assembly, she talked about the importance of women's education and called for the building of women's college and hostels.
