= Khwaja Wasiuddin =

Bangladeshi general and diplomat

Khawja Wasiuddin
- খাঁজা ওয়াসিউদ্দীন

Permanent Representative of Bangladesh to the United Nations
- In office 1982–1986
- Preceded by: Khwaja Mohammed Kaiser
- Succeeded by: B. A. Siddiqi

Personal details
- Born: 20 March 1920 Ahsan Manzil, Bengal Presidency, British India
- Died: 22 September 1992 (aged 72) Dhaka, Bangladesh

Military service
- Allegiance: (British Raj) British India (before 1947); Pakistan (before 1973); Bangladesh
- Branch/service: British Indian Army; Pakistan Army; Bangladesh Army
- Years of service: 1940 – 1977
- Rank: Lieutenant General
- Unit: 8th Punjab Regiment; East Bengal Regiment
- Commands: GOC of 14th Infantry Division; GOC of 10th Infantry Division; Corps Commander of II Corps; MGO of GHQ
- Battles/wars: World War II; Indo-Pakistani War of 1965; Bangladesh Liberation War

Khwaja Wasiuddin (20 March 1920 – 22 September 1992) was a three-star general of the Pakistan Army and the Bangladesh Army and a diplomat of Pakistan and Bangladesh from the Dhaka Nawab family. He started his career as a young officer in the British Indian Army and later became a senior general in the Pakistan Army. In 1971, he was the highest-ranking officer in the Pakistani army from East Pakistan. In 1973, he was repatriated to Bangladesh, where he was received at the airport by General M. A. G. Osmani. He later served as a senior general in the Bangladesh Army. He was the permanent representative of Bangladesh to the United Nations.

== Early life and education ==
Khwaja Wasiuddin was born on 20 March 1920 in Ahsan Manzil, Dacca, Bengal Presidency (present-day Bangladesh). His father, Khwaja Shahabuddin, was the governor of the North-West Frontier Province of Pakistan and a member of the Dhaka Nawab family; his father's elder brother was Sir Khwaja Nazimuddin, the second governor-general of Pakistan and subsequently its second prime minister. His mother was Farhat Banu, the niece of Nawab Sir Khwaja Salimullah and a member of the Bengal Legislative Assembly. He studied at Dhaka Muslim High School and later at St Gregory's High School. In 1938, he graduated from Prince of Wales Royal Indian Military College.

== Military career ==
After graduation, he joined the Indian Military Academy and was commissioned as a second lieutenant in April 1940 in the 8th Punjab Regiment of the British Indian Army. He served in the Burma Campaign of World War II. He reached the rank of major by 1943. In 1945, he was promoted to the rank of lieutenant colonel and appointed as the additional deputy president of the Inter Services Selection Board of the British Indian Armed Forces.

=== Pakistan ===
After the partition of India, he opted for the Pakistan Army. In Pakistan, he continued to work in the Inter Services Selection Board, eventually becoming its president. In 1951. He went for further studies at Camberley Staff College in the United Kingdom and subsequently was promoted to the rank of brigadier general.

In 1960, he was made the general officer commanding (GOC) of the 14th Division located in East Pakistan's Dhaka, and in 1963 he was the commander of the 10th Division located in Lahore, West Pakistan. Also, he was the chairman of Adamjee Cantonment College. In 1962, he was a provincial martial law administrator. In 1964, he got his higher education from Imperial Defense College in the United Kingdom. In 1967, he was promoted to the rank of lieutenant general and was appointed as the commander of the II Corps, the headquarters was firstly in Lahore and later was transferred to Multan, Punjab.

==== Colonel-Commandant of the East Bengal Regiment ====
As the oldest serving officer commissioned from the East Bengal Regiment, he was named as the colonel-commandant of the regiment. He also successfully advocated for the raising of new purely Bengali EBR battalions, which were the 8, 9 and 10 East Bengal battalions.

He stood out from other officers by giving speeches in Bangla.

=== Bangladesh ===
After Operation Searchlight, Wasiuddin wrote a strongly worded letter to President Yahya Khan criticizing his actions. He also urged Yahya to release Sheikh Mujibur Rahman and aim for a political solution.

In October 1973, he was repatriated to Bangladesh from Pakistan. General Osmani and a number of officers came out to receive him at the Tejgaon Airport. Despite Sheikh Mujibur Rahman planning on placing Wasiuddin as the army chief, freedom fighters within the army opposed it, as they wanted a freedom fighter to lead the army. According to Bangladeshi academic Rehman Sobhan, the three Mukti Bahini brigade commanders, Colonel K. M. Shafiullah, Colonel Khaled Mosharraf, and Colonel Ziaur Rahman, opposed his appointment because they wanted to become army chief themselves. He was offered a diplomatic posting instead.

== Diplomatic career ==
After returning to Bangladesh, he would serve as the ambassador of Bangladesh to Kuwait and France. He retired from the Bangladesh Army in 1977 and was made the permanent representative of Bangladesh to the United Nations, a position he held until 1986. As the representative, he supported Indonesia's annexation of East Timor in the United Nations.

== Death ==
He died on 22 September 1992 in Dhaka, Bangladesh.
