= Farida Rahman =

Bangladeshi politician (1945–2021)

- ফরিদা রহমান

Member of Bangladesh Parliament - Reserved Women's Seat-17
- In office 22 March 2009 – 20 November 2013
- Preceded by: Shamsunnahar Khwaja Ahsanullah
- Succeeded by: Monowara Begum

Personal details
- Born: 16 August 1945
- Died: 18 May 2021 (aged 75) Dhaka, Bangladesh
- Party: Bangladesh Awami League

Farida Rahman (16 August 1945 – 18 May 2021) was a Bangladesh Awami League politician and a Jatiya Sangsad member from the reserved women's seat-17 from 2009 until 2013.
