= Lutfey Siddiqi =

Bangladesh academic and political advisor

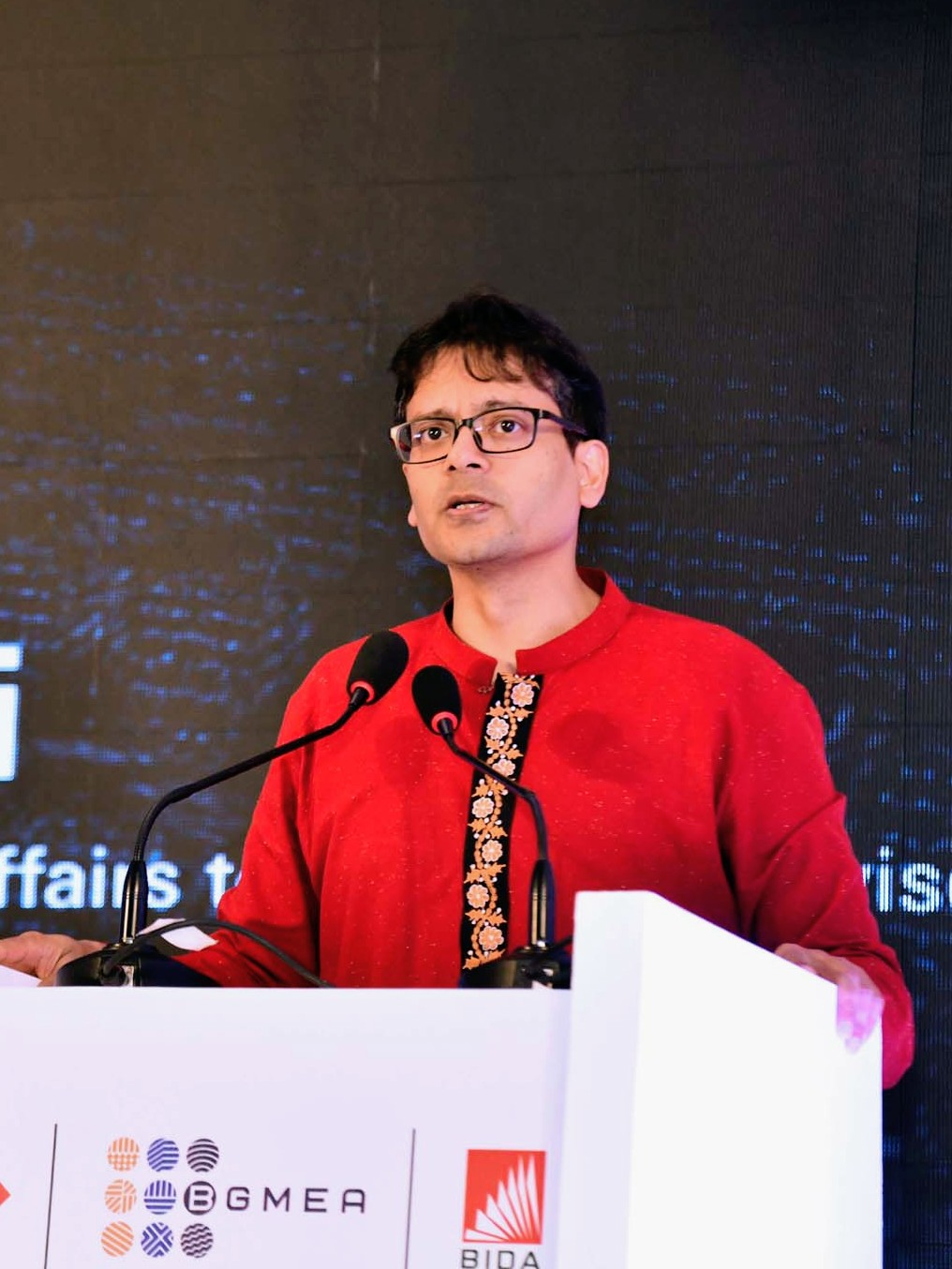
- Siddiqi in 2025

Special Envoy on International Affairs to the Chief Adviser
- In office 4 September 2024 – 17 February 2026
- Chief Adviser: Muhammad Yunus

Personal details
- Born: 1976 (age 49–50)
- Spouse: Deborah
- Parents: A. Y. B. I. Siddiqi (father); Rehana Siddiqi (mother)
- Education: University of York (BA) London School of Economics (MA)
- Occupation: Economist; Professor

Lutfey Siddiqi is a Bangladeshi academic and economist. He was the chief adviser's envoy for International affairs of Muhammad Yunus, head of the Interim government of Bangladesh. He is a visiting professor in Practice at the LSE IDEAS, the foreign policy think tank of the London School of Economics.

Siddiqi is an adjunct professor of the National University of Singapore Risk Management Institute. He is an agenda contributor of the World Economic Forum. He has spoken at a dozen events of World Economic Forum in Davos. He is a contributor to the Bretton Woods Committee.

== Early life ==
Siddiqi was born in December 1976. His family hails from Sitakunda Upazila, Chittagong District. His father is A. Y. B. I. Siddiqi, the 16th Inspector General of Police of Bangladesh Police, and his mother is Rehana Siddiqi. He studied at Scholastica in Dhaka and Atlantic College in Wales. He completed his bachelor and masters in economics from the University of York, and London School of Economics respectively.

== Career ==
In 2006, Siddiqi was the head of Risk Advisory and Corporate Foreign Exchange for Asia-Pacific of Barclays Bank. He was also a part-time lecturer at the National University of Singapore. In December, he was promoted to the managing director at Barclays Capital.

Siddiqi was the founding head of UBS Knowledge Network. In 2009, the government of Bangladesh declared him a Commercially Important Person (CIP).

In 2012, Siddiqi was recognized at the World Economic Forum as a Young Global Leader. He is a trustee and Kurt Hahn Circle of Donors member of the Atlantic College.

Siddiqi was part of a reception accorded to Professor Muhammad Yunus along with his father A. Y. B. I. Siddiqi, who hosted the event and mother Rehana Siddiqi in July 2013. It was hosted at Spectra Convention Centre in Gulshan and included Akbar Ali Khan, Fazle Hasan Abed, Latifur Rahman, and Rehman Sobhan. Yunus defended overstaying his term at Grameen Bank and the speakers applauded his achievements.

Siddiqi has contributed to the Huffington Post. He has spoken at the CFA Society New York.

Siddiqi was named the managing director of Regions and Society Relations of the CFA Institute in January 2021. He was appointed the co-curator for Banking and Capital Markets Transformation Map of the World Economic Forum.

== Personal life ==
Siddiqi is married to Deborah.
