= Khwaja Mohammed Kaiser =

Bangladeshi diplomat

- খাজা মোহাম্মদ কায়সার

Ambassador of Bangladesh to China
- In office 1984–1986

Permanent Representative of Bangladesh to the United Nations
- In office 1976–1982
- Preceded by: Syed Anwarul Karim
- Succeeded by: Khwaja Wasiuddin

Ambassador of Bangladesh to Myanmar
- In office 13 October 1972 – 9 March 1976
- Preceded by: Position created
- Succeeded by: Syed Anwarul Karim

Khwaja Mohammed Kaiser was a Bangladeshi diplomat and former Permanent Representative of Bangladesh to the United Nations.

== Early life ==
Kaiser was born in the Dhaka Nawab family.

== Career ==
Kaiser was the ambassador of Pakistan to China in 1971 during the Bangladesh Liberation War. Unlike other Bengali diplomats he choose not to defect to the Provisional Government of Bangladesh. From 1969 to 1972, he was the ambassador of Pakistan to China. He later defected to Bangladesh.

Kaiser was the Ambassador of Bangladesh to Myanmar in 1975. In July, he was appointed Permanent Representative of Bangladesh to the United Nations by President Sheikh Mujibur Rahman. His appointment was cancelled after Sheikh Mujibur Rahman was killed in a coup and he was appointed Ambassador of Bangladesh to China. He sought a delay in the order due to his wife's heart condition and need of surgery. He negotiated the safe passage of the army officers who killed Sheikh Mujibur Rahman to Thailand and in exchange for release of six Thai fishing trawlers seized in Bangladesh. He was also critical of India's reaction to the Assassination of Sheikh Mujibur Rahman.

From 1976 to 1982, Kaiser was the Permanent Representative of Bangladesh to the United Nations.

Kaiser stood for the president of the United Nations 36th General Assembly in September 1981 but lost to Ismat Kittani of Iraq in the third round of voting. He came third in the first round and second in the second round of voting.

In 1984, Kaiser was appointed ambassador of Bangladesh to China for a two-year term.
