= A. Y. B. I. Siddiqi =

Bangladeshi police chief (died 2021)

Inspector General of Police of Bangladesh Police
- In office 27 September 1998 – 7 June 2000
- Preceded by: Md Ismail Hossain
- Succeeded by: Muhammad Nurul Huda

Personal details
- Born: Abu Yusuf Burhanul Islam Siddiqi; 1944 or 1945
- Died: 18 July 2021 (aged 76) Dhaka, Bangladesh
- Spouse: Rehana
- Children: 2, including Lutfey Siddiqi

Abu Yusuf Burhanul Islam Siddiqi (1944/1945 – 18 July 2021), also known as Burhan Siddiqi, was a Bangladeshi diplomat and police officer who served as the inspector general of police during 1998–2000. He also played active roles in diplomatic and UN missions, having served as the chief liaison officer for UNTAG in Namibia (1989–1990) and the acting high commissioner of Bangladesh.

== Early life ==
Siddiqi grew up in Chittagong and moved to Lahore after completing his college studies.

== Career ==
Siddiqi served as the secretary of the Ministry of Water Resources and the Ministry of Local Government. His third contact of the local government secretary position expired on 31 December 2003. He retired from government service in 2004. He then served as an SME and consultant for multiple international water research, law and order, and development projects.

In 2006, Siddiqi served as the national project co-ordinator.

== Personal life ==
Siddiqi was married to Rehana Siddiqi since 1973. Together they had a son, Lutfey Siddiqi, who served as the chief adviser's envoy for international affairs of Muhammad Yunus, head of the interim government of Bangladesh. He also served as a managing director of United Bank of Switzerland. They also had a daughter, Husna Siddiqi-Lawson.

Siddiqi was diagnosed with cancer and was undergoing treatment at United Hospital in Dhaka until his death on 18 July 2021.
