= Mirza Delawar Hossain Ahmed =

First Muslim graduate in the British Raj

Khan Bahadur Mirza Delawar Hossain Ahmed
- দেলোয়ার হোসেন আহমদ
- Born: 1840; Hooghly district, Bengal
- Died: 1913 (aged 72–73); Bengal Presidency
- Education: University of Calcutta
- Occupation: Civil servant
- Era: British Raj

Mirza Delawar Hossain Ahmed (Bengali: মীর্জা দেলোয়ার হোসেন আহমদ; 1840–1913) was the first Muslim graduate in the British Raj. He served as a civil servant and was awarded the title of Khan Bahadur. He was known for his progressive outlook and support for intellectual and cultural awakening of Bengali Muslims.

== Early life ==
Ahmed was born in 1840 to a Bengali Muslim family of Mirzas in Babnan, Hooghly, in Mondal Para and Halderpara, Hooghly district, Bengal Presidency, British India. He graduated from the University of Calcutta, the first Muslim graduate of the college.

== Career ==
Ahmed joined the Indian Civil Service. He retired from the service with the rank of deputy magistrate in 1894. He was loyal to the British crown and was an advocate of British rule in India. He was given by the title of Khan Bahadur after retiring.

After retiring, Ahmed wrote in The Moslem Chronicle, a progressive English-language weekly. He also wrote for The Mussalman. He wrote in the English language and avoided writing in his native Bengali. He published Essays on Mohmmedan Social Reform, a two volume book, by Thacker Spink and Co from Calcutta in 1889.

== Death ==
Ahmed died in 1913.
