= Monowara Begum =

Bangladeshi politician

Member of Bangladesh Parliament
- In office 10 April 2014 – 30 December 2018
- Preceded by: Farida Rahman

Personal details
- Party: Bangladesh Awami League

Monowara Begum (Bengali: মনোয়ারা বেগম) is a Bangladesh Awami League politician and a former member of the Bangladesh Parliament from a reserved seat.

== Early life ==
Begum was born on 3 July 1950 and has a BSc degree.

== Career ==
Begum was elected to a reserved seat in parliament as a Bangladesh Awami League candidate in 2014.
