= Khwaja Hassan Askari =

- Nawab of Dhaka
- Reign: 1958–1975
- Predecessor: Nawab Khwaja Habibullah
- Successor: position abolished
- Born: 1920; Dacca, Bengal, British India
- Died: 1984 (aged 63–64); Karachi, Sindh, Pakistan
- Burial: Defence Graveyard Karachi
- House: Dhaka Nawab Family
- Father: Nawab Khwaja Habibullah
- Mother: Shehryar Bano
- Religion: Sunni Islam
- Military career
- Allegiance: Pakistan
- Branch: Pakistan Army
- Service years: 1944–1961
- Rank: Major

Nawab Major Khwaja Hassan Askari (21 August 1921 – 9 August 1984) was a Pakistani-Bengali and a military officer who was the sixth and last Nawab of Dhaka. He was born at the Ahsan Manzil Palace in Dhaka. He was the eldest son of Nawab Habibullah Bahadur and Shahryar Begum (the granddaughter of Nawab Khwaja Ahsanullah). He became the Nawab of Dhaka after his father's death in 1958.

== Early life ==
Nawab Hasan Askari was born on 21 August 1921 to the royal Nawab family of Dhaka, Bengal Presidency. The family was descended from Kashmiri merchants who settled in Bengal for trade. He completed his early education from the maktab at the Ahsan Manzil Palace and later joined the Muslim High School. His mother died when he was only ten years old after which he was sent to study at the Aligarh School and College from where he completed his B.A in 1940. At Aligarh he was part of the cricket team and the captain of riding club and was also the recipient of the Quaid-e-Azam Award, an honour that bestowed upon him during Quaid-e-Azam's visit to Aligarh University. He graduated from Aligarh University in 1942 and joined the British Indian Army in 1944 as a commissioned officer. He then went on to join the 7th Cavalry Regiment Armored Corps and took part in action on the Burma Front against Japanese. He left the British Indian army after being injured in a battle in Burma. He joined Pakistan army after partition of India in 1948 and remained in the force until 1961 with the rank of Major. In 1946 he was engaged to Bilquis Shehzadi, daughter of Nawab Hafeezuddin Khan of the State of Surat. He was married in 1948 in Hyderabad where they were the guests of the Nizam of Hyderabad and the bridal party stayed in one of their palaces. They have one daughter and four sons.

Nawab Hasan Askari served in the East Bengal Regiment. In 1949 he was transferred to the Nowshera Armored Corp and in 1950 joined Governor General's Body Guard as the First Adjutant when his uncle Sir Khawaja Nazimuddin K.C.I.E, C.I.E was the Governor General of Pakistan. In 1951 he returned to Dacca and served with the East Bengal Regiment in various parts of the country. In 1954 he was posted back to Rawalpindi and served with the 5th Regiment of the Armored Corp also known as the Probyns Horse regiment. He served between Rawalpindi and Manser Camp until 1959.

== Nawab ==
His father Nawab Khwaja Habibullah Bahadur died on 21 November 1958 and Nawab Hasan Askari became the last Nawab of Dhaka on 22 November 1958. The army then transferred him to East Pakistan and he simultaneously served at the army's recruiting office in Dacca. Due to a heart problem in 1961, Nawab Hasan Askari requested to resign from the army. He contested the 1962 elections on a Muslim League ticket and won a seat in the National Assembly of Pakistan. As per the constitution, he later resigned from his seat in the National Assembly and was appointed minister of the provincial cabinet in East Pakistan with portfolios of communications, waterways and railways. He started the first rail car service in East Pakistan which was then followed in West Pakistan and is credited with having had started the work of the new railway system in Dacca.

During the 1965 war he was the Chief Warden of Dacca and was later appointed Warden General of East Pakistan. He was awarded the Hilal-e-Khidmat by the then President Major General Ayub Khan in the 1960s for his services to the nation. He was the President of the East Pakistan Muslim League (Convention) until the liberation of Bangladesh.

Khawaja Hasan Askari was the guardian of the various philanthropic institutions like the Nawab Salimullah Orphanage, madrassah's supported by his family, Sir Salimullah Medical College, and Ahsanullah Engineering College also supported by his family. He was the director of P.I.A, I.D.B.P and various banks, P.I.D.C, president of the Pakistan Jute Mills Association, Dhaka Club and Dhaka Race Club, East Pakistan Cricket Board. He was also a member of the Chamber of Commerce.

== Liberation of Bangladesh and aftermath ==
He remained in Dhaka till 1975. Towards the end of 1974 at the request of then Prime Minister of Pakistan, Zulfikar Ali Bhutto who was visiting Dhaka, Sheikh Mujibur Rahman agreed upon Nawab Hasan Askari leaving Dhaka for Karachi. Sheikh Mujibur Rahman was of the opinion that the Nawab of Dhaka must stay in Bangladesh: in his country and with his people. In January 1975, Nawab Hassan Askari and his family left Bangladesh for Karachi.

He died in Karachi on 9 August 1984 and has been laid to rest in Karachi at the Defence Army Graveyard where his wife Begum Bilquis Askari was also laid to rest in 1995.
