= Scholastica (school) =

Private school in Dhaka, Bangladesh

- Dhaka; Bangladesh

Information
- School type: Cambridge Assessment International Education Private
- Founded: 1977; 49 years ago
- Founder: Yasmeen Murshed
- Chairperson: Zawaad Hossain
- Gender: Co-educational
- Classes: Play group to A Levels
- Language: English and Bengali
- Hours in school day: 8:00 am to 2:40 pm for students
- Campus: Uttara, Gulshan, Dhanmondi, Banani and Mirpur
- Campus type: Urban
- Colours: White and Blue
- Sports: Various
- Nickname: Stallions
- Website: scholasticabd.com

Scholastica is a private English medium school in Dhaka, Bangladesh, offering pre-school to A level courses. It was founded in 1977 by businesswoman and former advisor to the government, Yasmeen Murshed. The school follows the Cambridge International Curriculum set by the Cambridge Assessment International Education for Grade 9 to 12 and offers the GCE O Level, GCE AS Level and the GCE A Level qualifications. It is prominently recognised as one of the elite schools of Bangladesh, boasting a strong alumni network.

== History ==
Scholastica was founded in 1977 to meet the demands for schools having English as the medium of instruction, but emphasising equal proficiency in Bengali. At the time of its founding, the school comprised a single campus for junior-level students (grades PG to Class 2) in Dhanmondi. Since then, the school has expanded to six campuses: four for junior-level students, and two senior-level campuses. Both the Mirpur and Uttara campuses are now considered the school's main campus.

== Curriculum ==
Scholastica offers a complete primary, elementary, secondary and high school program leading to the General Certificate of Education examinations which are conducted by the British Council in Dhaka.

Since the 2008–09 academic session, the school's O and A Level examinations have been administered by Cambridge Assessment International Education, replacing the Edexcel system of schooling.

=== Laboratory ===
Laboratory facilities are provided for all the science classes. The senior laboratories are inspected and approved by the representatives of the University of London to meet its standard for the practical requirement of the 'O' and 'A' Level examinations.

=== Extra-curricular activities ===
Scholastica's extra-curricular activities include drama, debating and public speaking. The school also offers a large number of both teacher and student-run clubs. School teams participate in inter-school and national competitions. Theatrical presentations are performed in English and Bengali, and it is well known for its annual dramas. Several after-school programs are offered beginning in middle school.

The school is also famous for its renowned Model United Nations (Model UN) conferences, known as "SCHOMUN" in its Uttara Branch, which was also the first school-affiliated Model UN conference in the country. The conference is managed by the school's Model UN club, founded in 2015 with Shadman Shakib serving as the club's president during the 2015-2016 and 2016–2017 academic sessions.

The school's Mirpur Campus also hosts its own conference known as "SMUN". The school is also known for hosting the Scholastica Business Summit or "SBS."

== Notable alumni ==
- Tania Amir, lawyer and senior advocate of the Supreme Court of Bangladesh
- Wasfia Nazreen, first Bangladeshi and Bengali to complete the Seven Summits record
- Shazia Omar, Bangladeshi English-language novelist
- Iresh Zaker, a Bangladeshi advertising executive, television and film actor, and a musician
- Nizam Uddin Jalil John, former member of parliament
- Tulip Siddiq, British member of parliament, politician, and niece of Sheikh Hasina
- Lutfey Siddiqi, special envoy of the government of Bangladesh
- Ishraque Hossain, politician, Member of Parliament and engineer
- Sunerah Binte Kamal, Bangladeshi actress and model

== Notable faculty ==
- Zafar Sobhan taught English literature at Scholastica for a year.
