= Haseena (film) =

- Film poster
- Directed by: Vicky Ranawat
- Written by: Rishi Aazad
- Produced by: Jitendra B. Wagadia & Vicky Ranawat
- Starring: Inayat Sharma; Arpit Soni; Mohit Arora; Ankur Verma
- Cinematography: Gagrin
- Edited by: Kuckoo, Vinayak Solanki
- Music by: Shahid
- Distributed by: PRF
- Release date: 5 January 2018
- Running time: 135 minutes
- Country: India
- Language: Hindi

Haseena is a Bollywood erotic comedy-drama film directed by Vicky Ranawat and jointly produced by Jitendra B. Wagadia and Vicky Ranawat and co-produced by Saral Ranawat. The principal photography and shooting stated in 2017. In film three friends named Rohit, Rahul and Rajan try to impress a woman.

The film was initially set to release on July 14, 2017, which was reported to clash with the similarly titled Haseena Parkar.

== Cast ==
- Arpit Soni as Rohit
- Ankur Verma as Rahul
- Mohit Arora as Rajan
- Inayat Sharma as Haseena

== Production and release ==
The film went into production in 2017, and was released on 5 January 2018 domestically and in overseas markets.

== Music ==
There are totally 4 songs in this movie which are as follow.

No	Song name	Singer(s)	Length
1	Party Sharty	Saurabh, viplove, Devraj Naik	3:16
2	London Ghumaede	Shahid Bawa, Tarannum malik	3:55
3	Roko Na	Ali Aslam, Shom chanda	4:12
4	Khidki	Shahid Bawa, Shamila khan	3:02
