= Tahera Kabir =

Bangladeshi social activist

- তাহেরা কবির
- Died: 10 October 1980
- Occupation: Social activist
- Spouse: Alamgir M. A. Kabir
- Father: Khwaja Shahabuddin
- Awards: Independence Day Award (1979)

Tahera Kabir (died 10 October 1980) was a Bangladeshi social activist. She received Independence Day Award on 1979 for her contribution in social welfare activity.

== Work ==
Kabir founded the Association for the Correction and Social Rehabilitation of Bangladesh to help the poor and homeless people of society. The NGO runs a shelter house for orphans and homeless street children in Mirpur, Dhaka.

== Personal life and death ==
Tahera Kabir was married to Alamgir M. A. Kabir. She was the eldest daughter of Khwaja Shahabuddin, who belonged to the Nawab family of Dhaka.

Tahera Kabir died on 10 October 1980.
