= The Moslem Chronicle =

English language newspaper from Kolkata

The Moslem Chronicle was a short lived weekly English language newspaper in the late 19th century published from Kolkata. The newspaper represented the views of a Europeanised Muslim Bengali community.

== History ==
The Moslem Chronicle started publication in 1895. It was published by Abdul Hamid and was the mouthpiece of the educated Bengali Muslims who were educated in English language. The newspaper was known for supporting modernization of the Muslim community and providing a space for free thinkers. It published writings by Meerza Delawar Hosaen Ahmed, the first Muslim graduate of the University of Kolkata. The newspaper wrote about issues important to the Muslim community such as education, Muslim-Indian National Congress relations, etc. The newspaper also wrote about discrimination by the British against the native Bengali population. The Muslim Chronicle also wrote about the looming partition of Bengal during its last few years. The newspaper seized publication in 1905. It is a valuable source material on Bengali Muslim life in the late 19th century. It formally stopped publication in 1910; having practically stopped publication before.
