= Khwaja Ahsanullah =

Nawab Sir Khwaja Ahsanullah
- Nawab Bahadur; Nawab of Dhaka
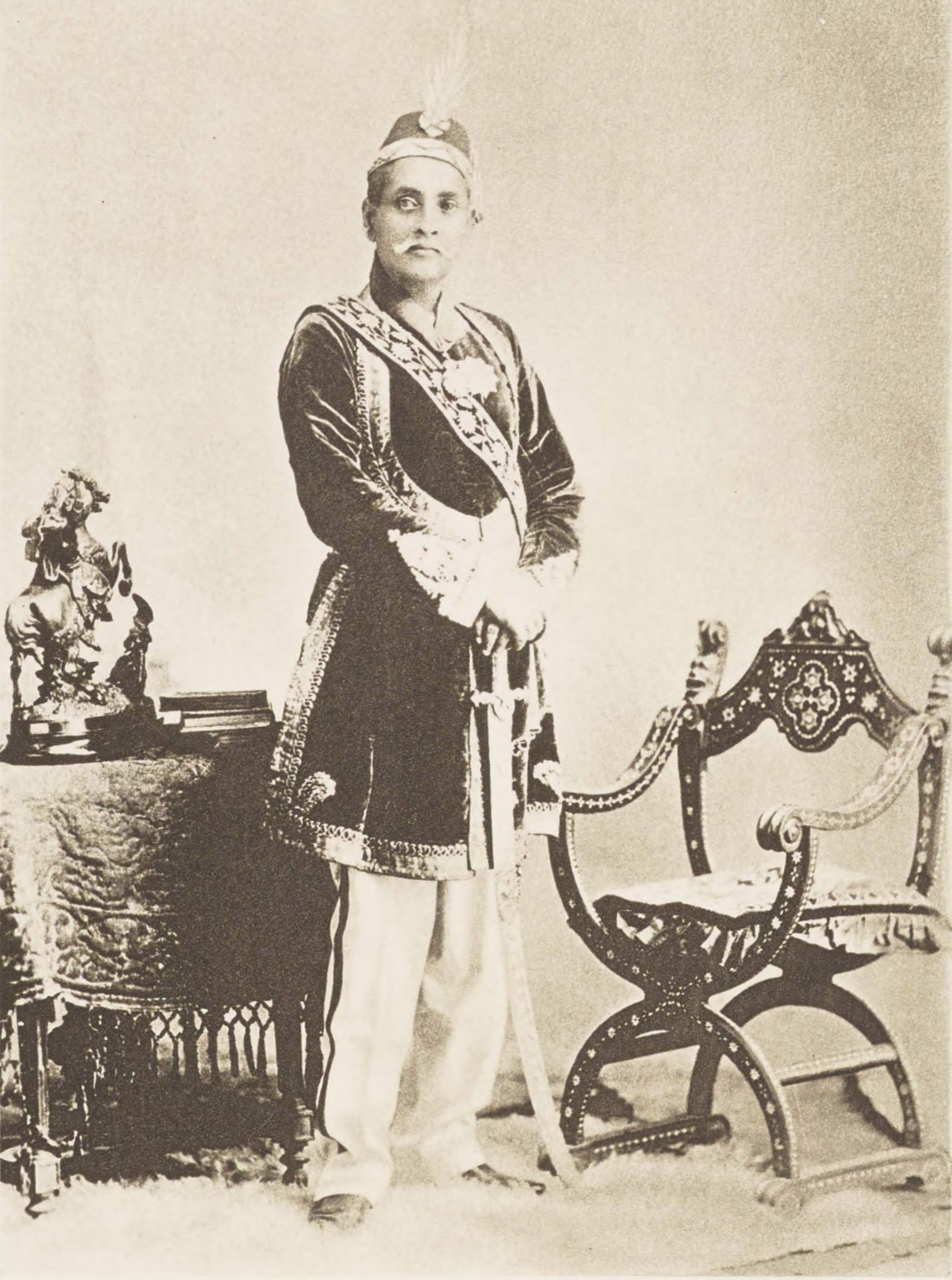
- Ahsanullah in 1871
- Reign: 1896–1901
- Predecessor: Khwaja Abdul Ghani
- Successor: Khwaja Salimullah
- Born: 22 August 1846; Dacca, Bengal, British India
- Died: 16 December 1901 (aged 55); Dacca, Bengal, British India
- Burial: Begum Bazaar; Dhaka, Bangladesh
- Spouse: Wahidunnesa Begum; Farhat Begum; Kamrunnesa Bibi; Khodeja Begum
- Issue: Khwaja Salimullah, Khwaja Atiqullah, Meherbanu Khanam, Bilqis Banu
- House: Dhaka Nawab Family
- Father: Khwaja Abdul Ghani
- Mother: Ismatun Nesa Begum
- Religion: Sunni Islam

Nawab Bahadur Sir Khwaja Ahsanullah KCIE (22 August 1846 – 16 December 1901) was the third Nawab of Dhaka. He was notable for his philanthropic works in Bengal, notably his donations to the present Bangladesh University of Engineering and Technology and for introducing electricity in his native city of Dhaka. He also authored books in Persian and Urdu under the pen name of Shaheen. The palace Ahsan Manzil is named after him by his father, Khwaja Abdul Ghani.

== Early life ==
Ahsanullah was born in 1846 to Khwaja Abdul Ghani and Ismatun Nesa. As a young child, he learned Urdu, Arabic and Persian, and the Islamic education of Quran, Hadith, and Fiqh. He was noted as being a very gifted child and mastered the religious Islamic doctrine at a very young age. By age 22, he handled the maintenance and expansion of the family estates.

== Literature ==
Ahsanullah wrote widely in Urdu under the pen name Shaheen, and much of his spare time was spent composing literature in Urdu and Persian. Those around him noted his talent for composing spontaneous poetry, which generally evoked sunny imagery. He published a book of Persian and Urdu poems, Kulliyat-e-Shaheen, which was preserved at the University of Dhaka. He also published his diaries, titled Tarikh-e-Khandan-e-Kashmiriyah. In 1884, he started an Urdu magazine, Ahsanut Qasas, which was published in Dhaka.

== Philanthropy ==
Ahsanullah was a noted philanthropist. He donated over 5 million rupees to various charitable projects and renovated Pir Yemeni's mazar (mausoleum). He spent over 50,000 rupees on famine relief in Barisal District, Mymensingh District and Dhaka District in 1896. He was also one of the chief backers of the Comilla building. Electricity was introduced to Dhaka, Bangladesh, on December 7, 1901. Khwaja Ahsanullah financed the project. He funded and constructed many hospitals, including the Patuankali Begam Hospital, Lady Dufferin Women's Hospital, and the Mitford Hospital. He also spent 120 thousand rupees on creating an engineering college in Dhaka, now the Bangladesh University of Engineering and Technology.

=== Islamic activities ===
Ahsanullah was an ardent advocate for Muslims. He created several mosques and madrasas, including the Madaripur and Begambari mosques and madrassas. He also restored and rebuilt over 15 dargahs and mosques. He was a member of the Central Northern Muhammadan Association, which played a large role in his works. He supported the 1905 Partition of Bengal, which his son Khwaja Salimullah facilitated.

Ahsanullah had a hobby of maintaining zoos. He had three zoos in Dhaka – Begunbari, Dilkhusa, and Shahbagh. The zoos held peacocks, deer, and other exotic animals.

== Awards and titles ==
Ahsanullah was awarded a Khan Bahadur in 1871, a Nawab in 1875, a Companion of the Order of the Indian Empire (CIE) in 1891, a Nawab Bahadur in 1892, a Knight Commander of the Order of the Indian Empire (KCIE) in 1897, and a member of the Governor-General's Legislative Council in 1890 and again in 1899.

Ahsanullah was awarded many titles for his social and philanthropic work. Both he and his father were noted allies of the British Raj.

== Death and legacy ==
Ahsanullah died on 16 December 1901 of heart failure. He was buried in the family plot in Begum Bazar in Dhaka.

Ahsanullah was married to Wahidunnesa Begum, Farhat B. Nawab Begum, Kamrunnesa Bibi (d. 1900) and Khodeja Begum (d. 1900). His only son, Khwaja Salimullah, and a grandson, Khwaja Habibullah, became Dhaka's 4th and 5th nawabs. Ahsanullah's other grandson, through his daughter Bilqis Banu, Khawaja Nazimuddin, served as the governor general (1948–1951) and Pakistan's prime minister (1951–1953).
