= Partition of Bengal (1905) =

Territorial partition in British India

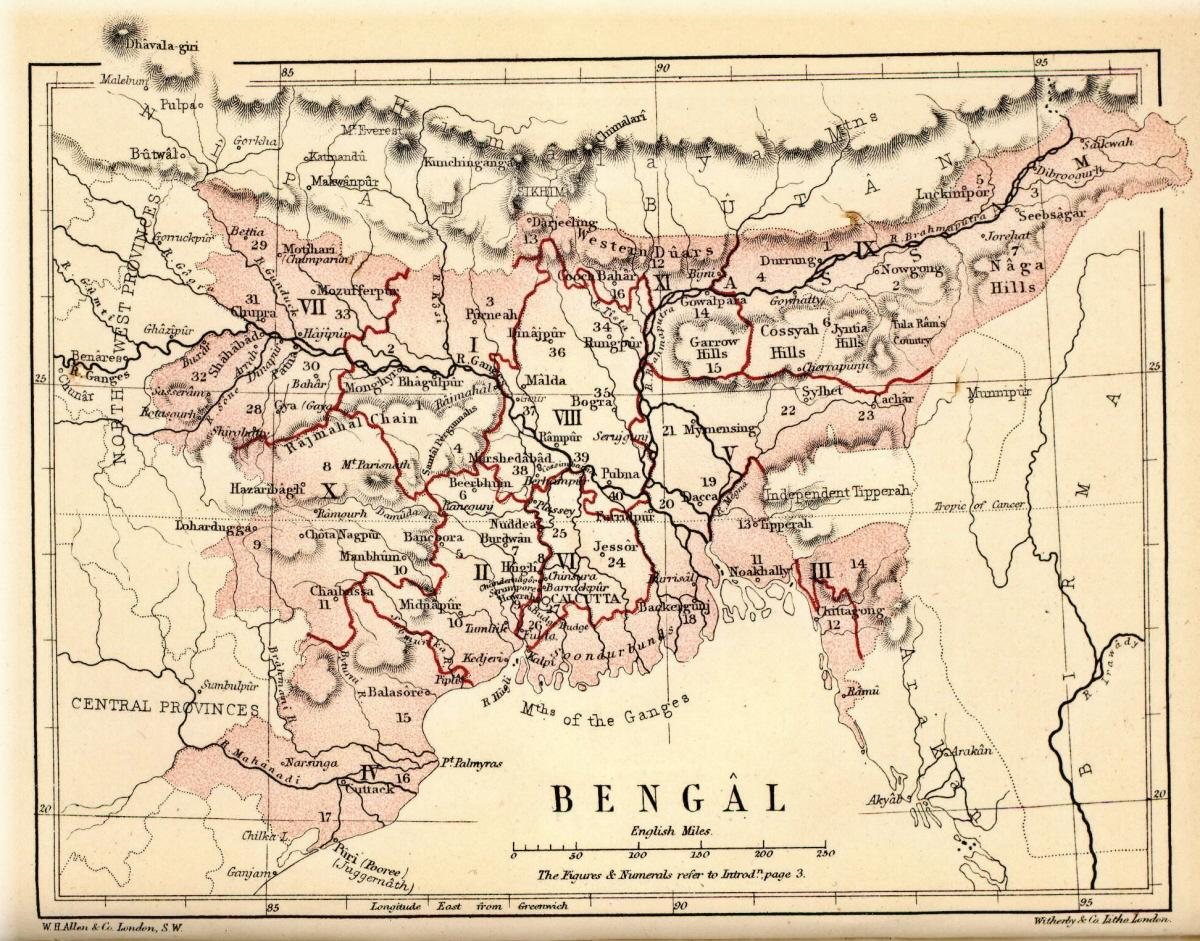
Map showing the modern day nation of Bangladesh and Indian states of Bihar, Jharkhand, Orissa, Assam, Meghalaya, Arunachal Pradesh and parts of Nagaland and Manipur within the Bengal Presidency before division into Bihar and Orissa, Eastern Bengal and Assam and West Bengal.

The Partition of Bengal in 1905, also known as the First Partition of Bengal, was a territorial reorganization of the Bengal Presidency in British India, implemented by the authorities of the British Raj. Announced on 16 October 1905 by Lord Curzon, then Viceroy of India, the reorganization separated the largely Muslim eastern areas from the largely Hindu western areas, creating West Bengal for Hindus and East Bengal for Muslims. The reorganization was undone a mere six years later.

The Partition was undertaken primarily for administration purposes but in fact was treated as a divide and rule policy and further agitated people, who perceived that it was a deliberate attempt to divide the Bengal Presidency on religious grounds, with a Muslim majority in the east and a Hindu majority in the west, thereby weakening the nationalist cause. The Hindus of West Bengal, who dominated Bengal's business and rural life, complained that the division would make them a minority in a province that would incorporate the province of Bihar and Orissa. Hindus were outraged at this "divide and rule" policy, even though Curzon stressed it would produce administrative efficiency. The partition animated the Muslims to form their own national organization along communal lines. To appease Bengali sentiment and in response to the Swadeshi movement's riots in protest against the policy, Bengal was reunited by the British government in 1911.

The Bengal Presidency encompassed Bengal, Bihar, parts of present-day Chhattisgarh, Orissa, and Assam. With a population of 78.5 million, it was British India's largest province. For decades British officials had maintained that the huge size created difficulties for effective management and had caused neglect of the poorer eastern region. The idea of the partition had been brought up only for administrative reasons. Therefore, Curzon planned to split Orissa and Bihar and join fifteen eastern districts of Bengal with Assam. The eastern province held a population of 31 million, most of which was Muslim, with its centre at Dhaka. Curzon pointed out that he thought of the new province as Muslim. Lord Curzon's intention was to divide Bengalis, but not specifically Hindus from Muslims. The western districts formed the other province with Orissa and Bihar. The union of western Bengal with Orissa and Bihar reduced the speakers of the Bengali language to a minority. Muslims, led by the Nawab Sallimullah of Dhaka, supported the partition, and Hindus opposed it.

== Partition ==
The English-educated middle class of Bengal, the Bengali Bhadraloks, saw this as a vivisection of their motherland as well as a tactic to diminish their authority. In the six-month period before the partition was to be effected, the Congress arranged meetings where petitions against the partition were collected and given to impassive authorities. Surendranath Banerjee had "cautioned the Biharis against the scheme of separation in a newspaper called Bengalee". However, the Bengalee rejected the idea of an independent Bihar. This only further encouraged the Biharis to demand separation. Therefore, the Partition of Bengal province in 1905 caused not only conflicts within the unified Bengal province consisting of Bengali speakers, but also in other neighbouring regions (part of the larger Bengal province), such as Bengal, Orissa, and Assam. Banerjee admitted that the petitions were ineffective; as the date for the partition drew closer, he began advocating tougher approaches, such as boycotting British goods. He preferred to label this move as swadeshi instead of a boycott. The boycott was led by the moderates, but minor rebel groups also sprouted under its cause.

Banerjee believed that other targets ought to be included. Government schools were spurned, and on 16 October 1905, the day of partition, schools and shops were blockaded. The demonstrators were cleared off by units of the police and army. This was followed by violent confrontations, due to which the older leadership in the Congress became anxious and convinced the younger Congress members to stop boycotting the schools. The president of the Congress, G.K. Gokhale, Banerji, and others stopped supporting the boycott when they found that John Morley had been appointed as Secretary of State for India. Believing that he would sympathise with the Indian middle class, they trusted him and anticipated the reversal of the partition through his intervention.

The day of partition (16 October 1905) also coincided with Raksha Bandhan day, which celebrates sibling relationships. In protest, Federation Hall society was founded by nationalist leaders like, Surendranath Banerjee, Tarak Nath Palit, Ananda Mohan Bose. Renowned novelist Rabindranath Tagore made it compulsory for every individual to tie rakhi, especially to Muslims, to emphasize inter-religious bonds and that Bengal did not want partition.

== Political crisis ==
The partition triggered radical nationalism and nationalists all over India supported the Bengali cause, and were shocked at the British disregard for public opinion and what they perceived as a "divide and rule" policy. The protests spread to Bombay, Pune, and Punjab. Lord Curzon had believed that the Congress was no longer an effective force but provided it with a cause to rally the public around and gain fresh strength from. The partition also caused embarrassment to the Indian National Congress. Gokhale had earlier met prominent British liberals, hoping to obtain constitutional reforms for India. The radicalization of Indian nationalism because of the partition would drastically lower the chances for the reforms. However, Gokhale successfully steered the more moderate approach in a Congress meeting and gained support for continuing talks with the government. In 1906 Gokhale again went to London to hold talks with Morley about the potential constitutional reforms. While the anticipation of the liberal nationalists increased in 1906 so did tensions in India. The moderates were challenged by the Congress meeting in Calcutta, which was in the middle of the radicalised Bengal. The moderates countered this problem by bringing Dadabhai Naoroji to the meeting. He defended the moderates in the Calcutta session and thus the unity of the Congress was maintained. The 1907 Congress was to be held at Nagpur. The moderates were worried that the extremists would dominate the Nagpur session. The venue was shifted to the extremist free Surat. The resentful extremists flocked to the Surat meeting. There was an uproar and both factions held separate meetings. The extremists had Aurobindo and Tilak as leaders. They were isolated while the Congress was under the control of the moderates. The 1908 Congress Constitution formed the All-India Congress Committee, made up of elected members and therefore thronging the meetings would no longer work for the extremists.

== Response of Muslim Bengalis ==
When first announced in 1903, the Muslim organizations The Moslem Chronicle and The Central National Muhamedan Association condemned the proposal. Muslim leaders Chowdhury Kazemuddin Ahmed Siddiky, Delwar Hossain Ahmed denounced the idea. Reasons behind their opposition included the threat of partition to Bengali solidarity as well as fear that the educational, social and other interests of East Bengal would become diminished under a chief commissioner. In 1904, Curzon took an official tour to visit the Muslim-majority districts of East Bengal to gain buy-in for the proposal. He hinted that he was considering Dacca as the new capital of East Bengal and asserted that the plan "would invest the Mohamedans in Eastern Bengal with a unity which they have not enjoyed since the old days of old Musalman viceroys and kings."

Once the educated Muslims learned about the independence that a separate province would allow, most started supporting the partition. In 1905, The Mohammedan Literary Society published a manifesto endorsed by seven Muslim leading personalities with the urge for Muslims in East and West to support the partition measure. The impending notion of a new province provided the oft-neglected Muslim Bengalis a chance to raise their own voices and issues specific to their community and region. On 16 October 1905, the Mohammedan Provincial Union was founded to bring together all existing Muslim entities and groups. Nawab Bahadur Sir Khwaja Salimullah was unanimously declared as the patron of this union.

Although the majority of Muslims supported the partition, a few prominent Muslim spokespersons continued to be against it. Due to family dispute, Khwaja Atiqullah, a step-brother of Nawab Bahadur Sir Khwaja Salimullah brought a resolution at the Calcutta session of the Congress (1906) denouncing the partition of Bengal. Some others included: Abdur Rasul, Khan Bahadur Muhammad Yusuf (a pleader and a member of the Management Committee of the Central National Muhamedan Association), Mujibur Rahman, Abdul Halim Ghaznavi, Ismail Hossain Shiraji, Muhammad Gholam Hossain (a writer and a promoter of Hindu-Muslim unity), Maulvi Liaqat Hussain (a liberal Muslim who vehemently opposed the 'Divide and Rule' policy of the British), Syed Hafizur Rahman Chowdhury of Bogra and Abul Kasem of Burdwan. A few Muslim preachers like Din Muhammad of Mymensingh and Abdul Gaffar of Chittagong preached Swadeshi ideas.

There were a few who strived to promote Hindu-Muslim solidarity; such was the position of AK Fazlul Huq and Nibaran Chandra Das through their weekly Balaka (1901, Barisal) and monthly Bharat Suhrd (1901, Barisal).

In 1906, the All India Muslim League was founded at Dacca through the initiative of Nawab Bahadur Sir Khwaja Salimullah. The traditional and reformist Muslim groups – the Faraizi, Wahabi and Taiyuni – supported the Partition.

The Muslim-majority East Bengal had remained backward, since all educational, administrative, and professional opportunities were centered around Calcutta. The promise of a Muslim-majority East Bengal and its own capital in the region had made the aspiration for opportunities difficult in the past.

As the Swadeshi movement was tied to the anti-partition agenda and had Hindu overtones, many Muslims were concerned that the movement would harm their community. Eminent authors like Mir Mosharraf Hossain were sharp critics of the Swadeshi movement.

== Reunited Bengal (1911) ==
The authorities, not able to end the protests, assented to reversing the partition. King George V announced at Delhi Durbar on 12 December 1911 that eastern Bengal would be assimilated into the Bengal Presidency. Districts where Bengali was spoken were once again unified, and Assam, Bihar and Orissa were separated. The capital was shifted to New Delhi, clearly intended to provide the British colonial government with a stronger base. Muslims of Bengal were shocked because they had seen the Muslim majority East Bengal as an indicator of the government's enthusiasm for protecting Muslim interests. They saw this as the government compromising Muslim interests for Hindu appeasement and administrative ease.

The partition had not initially been supported by Muslim leaders. After the Muslim majority province of Eastern Bengal and Assam had been created prominent Muslims started seeing it as advantageous. Muslims, especially in Eastern Bengal, had been backward in the period of United Bengal. The Hindu protest against the partition was seen as interference in a Muslim province. With the move of the capital to a Mughal site, the British tried to satisfy Bengali Muslims who were disappointed with losing hold of eastern Bengal.

By 1911, the position of Bengali Muslims in East Bengal and Assam exhibited improvement. As opposed to one-eighth of the 1,235 higher appointments in 1901, Muslims in 1911 occupied almost one-fifth of the 2,305 gazetted appointments held by Indians.

== Aftermath ==
The Partition of Bengal in 1905 was essentially aimed at debilitating the Bengali nationalists, who were part of the Congress party. However, Curzon's plan did not work at the time as intended because it only further encouraged the extremists within Congress to resist and rebel against the colonial government. Historians like Sekhar Bandyopadhyay have argued how Curzon's plan only further "magnified the nationalist angst". Although extremists and moderates both advocated for swaraj, their interpretations differed. Leaders like Bal Gangadhar Tilak advocated for self-rule, but not at the cost of "total severance of relations with Great Britain". Bipin Pal and Aurobindo Ghosh argued it was not possible to have self-rule under British rule and therefore advocated for complete autonomy of governance independent of British control. The emergence of this new nationalist fervour post-1905, backed with literature, reconstruction of a glorious past destroyed by the colonisers, and advocating all things Indian – from an Indian past written by Indians to Indian clothes and goods – can all be traced back to Curzon's decision of partitioning the Bengal province. Although in 1911, this partition was revoked, many scholars have also argued that this time gave birth to a unified Bengali nationalist identity. However, an argument that is debatable on account of the subsequent politics in the province from the late 1920s onwards.

The uproar that had greeted Curzon's contentious move of splitting Bengal, as well as the emergence of the 'extremist' faction in the Congress, became the final motive for separatist Muslim politics. In 1909, separate elections were established for Muslims and Hindus. Before this, many members of both communities had advocated national solidarity of all Bengalis. With separate electorates, distinctive political communities developed, with their own political agendas. Muslims, too, dominated the Legislature, due to their overall numerical strength of roughly twenty two to twenty eight million. Muslims began to demand the creation of independent states for Muslims, where their interests would be protected.

In 1947, Bengal was partitioned for the second time, solely on religious grounds, as part of the Partition of India. East Bengal joined with the Muslim majority provinces in the western part of India (Balochistan, Punjab, Sindh, and the North-West Frontier Province), creating a new state of Pakistan. East Bengal, the only non-contiguous part of Pakistan, was renamed "East Pakistan" in 1955. In 1971, East Pakistan became the independent nation of Bangladesh.

The 1947 Partition, based on the Radcliffe Line, bore an uncanny resemblance with Curzon's partition of 1905. Radcliffe's line informed the Congress Plan, i.e., there ought to be equal number of Hindu and Muslim population in both provinces of Bengal. Therefore, East Bengal had 71 per cent Muslims whereas West Bengal had 70.8 per cent Hindus. The latter had a few more Muslim population from unified Bengal than the Congress would have liked given its plan did not exactly work. Historian Joya Chatterji illustrates how "the figures would have been 68 per cent and 77 per cent respectively".

== See also ==
- West Bengal
- Partition of Bengal (1947)
