= Khwaja Habibullah =

Fifth and last Nawab of Dhaka (1895–1958) (r.1915–1958)

Nawab Khwaja Habibullah
- Nawab of Dhaka
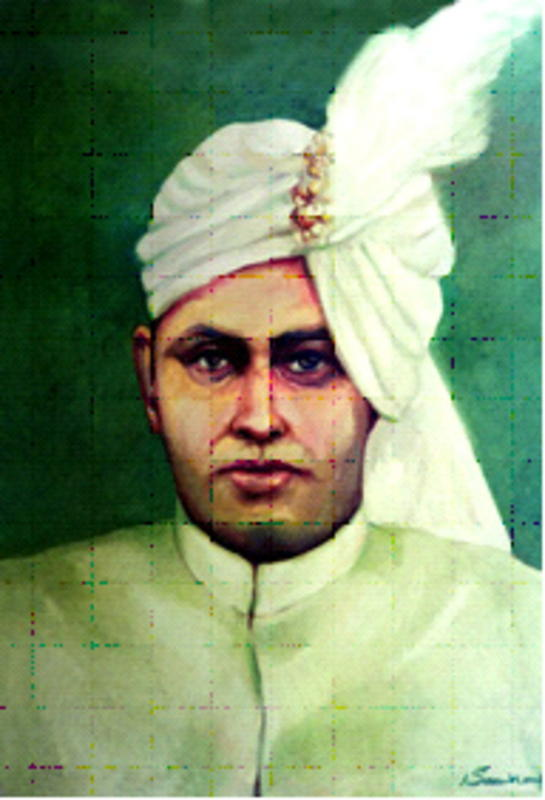
- Habibullah in 1947
- Reign: 1915–1958
- Predecessor: Nawab Khwaja Salimullah
- Successor: Khawja Hassan Askari
- Born: 26 April 1895; Ahsan Manzil, Dacca, Bengal Presidency, British India
- Died: 21 November 1958 (aged 63); Shahbagh, Dacca, East Pakistan, Pakistan
- Burial: Begum Bazar, Dhaka
- Spouses: Ajmiri Begum; Shahryar Khanam; Khurshidi Begum; Amirun Bibi; Ayesha Begum
- House: Dhaka Nawab family
- Father: Nawab Khwaja Salimullah
- Religion: Sunni Islam
- Military career
- Allegiance: British Empire
- Branch: British Indian Army
- Service years: 1918–1920
- Rank: Jemadar
- Unit: 49th Bengalee Regiment
- Conflicts: World War I; Mesopotamian campaign

Nawab Khwaja Habibullah Bahadur (Bengali: নবাব খাজা হাবিবুল্লাহ বাহাদুর; 26 April 1895 – 21 November 1958) was a politician from East Bengal, soldier, social worker, and the fifth Nawab of Dhaka. He was the son of Nawab Sir Khwaja Salimullah Bahadur. Under Habibullah's rule, the Dhaka Nawab Estate went into decline until its actual relinquishment in 1952 by the East Pakistan Estates Acquisition Act.

== Biography ==
Habibullah was born on 26 April 1895 in Dhaka. His father was Nawab Sir Khwaja Salimullah Bahadur of the Dhaka Nawab family. The family traced its ancestry to Kashmiri merchants who settled in Bengal for trade during Mughal and British times. Habibullah went to school at St. Paul's School in Darjeeling, and later continued his education in England. In 1915, at the death of his father, he succeeded as the Nawab of Dhaka.

In 1918, Habibullah joined the Bengali Platoon of the British Indian Army. He served in the British mandate of Mesopotamia as an honorary lieutenant. He served on the Dhaka district board and the Dhaka municipality board. He took part in the Khilafat Movement. He was the representative of Dhaka in the Bengal Legislative council from 1924 till 1932.

Habibullah had supported the 1932 Communal Award proposal of the British Raj. In 1935 he was the president of the Bengal Muslim League and a member of the executive council of the All India Muslim League. From 1937 to 1941, he was a minister in the cabinet of A. K. Fazlul Huq. He joined the second cabinet of Haq against the wishes of the Muslim League, for which he was suspended from the league till 1946. In 1946, he stood in the assembly election of Bengal as an independent candidate but suffered a heavy defeat at the hands of his relative, Khwaja Khairuddin, who was on a Muslim League ticket.

Habibullah presided over the committee that organized the Pakistan Independence Day celebrations in Dhaka, and, on 15 August 1947, raised the flag of Pakistan at Lalbagh Fort. After the partition of India, he held the position of vice-president in the East Pakistan Muslim League. During his reign as the Nawab of Dhaka, the estate continued the decline that had begun under his father.

== Personal life and death ==
Habibullah was married to Ajmiri Begum, Shahriar Khanam (d. 1931), Khurshidi Begum, Amirun Bibi, and Ayesha Begum (d. 2008).

He had a total of five sons and two daughters. His cousin, Khwaja Nazimuddin, was the Prime Minister of Pakistan (1951–1953).

In later days, he retired from politics because of health-related reasons. He left the Ahsan Manzil Palace and resided in another of the royal residences, Green House, in Dhaka's Paribagh. He died on 21 November 1958 and was buried alongside his father at the Nawab family graveyard in Begumbazar in Dhaka.
