= Khwaja Shahabuddin =

Pakistani politician

Khawaja Shahabuddin

5th Governor of North-West Frontier Province
- In office 26 November 1951 – 17 November 1954
- Governor General: Malik Ghulam Muhammad
- Preceded by: Ibrahim Ismail Chundrigar
- Succeeded by: Qurban Ali Khan

2nd Minister of Interior
- In office 8 May 1948 – 26 November 1951
- Prime Minister: Liaquat Ali Khan
- Preceded by: Fazl-ur-Rehman
- Succeeded by: Mushtaq Ahmed Gurmani

Minister of Information & Broadcasting
- In office March 24, 1965 – March 25, 1969
- President: Ayub Khan
- Preceded by: Abdul Waheed Khan
- Succeeded by: Yahya Khan

Personal details
- Born: 31 May 1898
- Died: 9 February 1977 (aged 78) Karachi, Sindh, Pakistan
- Spouse: Farhat Banu (m. 1915)
- Children: Tahera Kabir; Khwaja Zakiuddin; Khwaja Wasiuddin

Khwaja Shahabuddin (31 May 1898 – 9 February 1977) was a Pakistani politician from East Pakistan who was a minister in the Government of Pakistan and member of the Dhaka Nawab family. He was the younger brother of Sir Khwaja Nazimuddin and the father of Bangladeshi Lieutenant-General Khwaja Wasiuddin.

== Early life ==
Khwaja Shahabuddin was born on 31 May 1898. His father was Khwaja Nizamuddin, who was a zamindar. Shahabuddin served as the municipality commissioner of Dhaka from 1918 to 1921. In 1921, he joined the Dhaka district board. He became the chairman of the board in 1923 to 1924. From 1928 to 1944, he was the president of Dhaka district Muslim League.

== Career ==
In 1936, he was a member of the executive council of the Governor of Bengal Presidency. From 1930 to 1938 he was the treasurer at the University of Dhaka. He was elected to the Bengal legislative assembly from Narayanganj in 1937. He was the Chief Whip in the A K Fazlul Haq government in Bengal from 1937 to 1941. He was the Minister of Commerce, Labour and Industry in his brother's government from 1943 to 1945.

Shahabuddin was involved in the movement for the creation of Pakistan. In 1947, he became the Chief whip in National Assembly of Pakistan. In 1948, he became the Minister of Home Affairs, Information and Broadcasting in the cabinet of Liaquat Ali Khan. In 1951, he was appointed Governor of the North West Frontier Province. He was the Ambassador of Pakistan to Saudi Arabia and Yemen in 1954, Egypt in 1958, Nigeria, Cameroon, Senegal, Togo and Sierra Leone from 1961 to 1964. He served as the Minister of Information and Broadcasting from 1965 to 1969 under the administration of Ayub Khan.

== Pakistan Football Federation ==
Shahabuddin served as president of the Pakistan Football Federation between 1950 and 1951.

== Death ==
He died on 9 February 1977 in Karachi, Pakistan, aged 78.

Political offices
Preceded by Fazlur Rehman	Interior Minister of Pakistan; 1948 – 1951	Succeeded by Mushtaq Ahmed Gurmani
Preceded by I.I. Chundrigar	Governor of Khyber-Pakhtunkhwa; 1951 – 1954	Succeeded by Qurban Ali Khan
Preceded by	Minister of Information and Broadcasting of Pakistan; 1965 – 1969	Succeeded by
