= Khwaja Salimullah =

Politician, patron of Bengali education and Nawab of Dhaka (1871-1915) (r. 1901-1915)

Khwaja Salimullah Bahadur
- Nawab of Dhaka
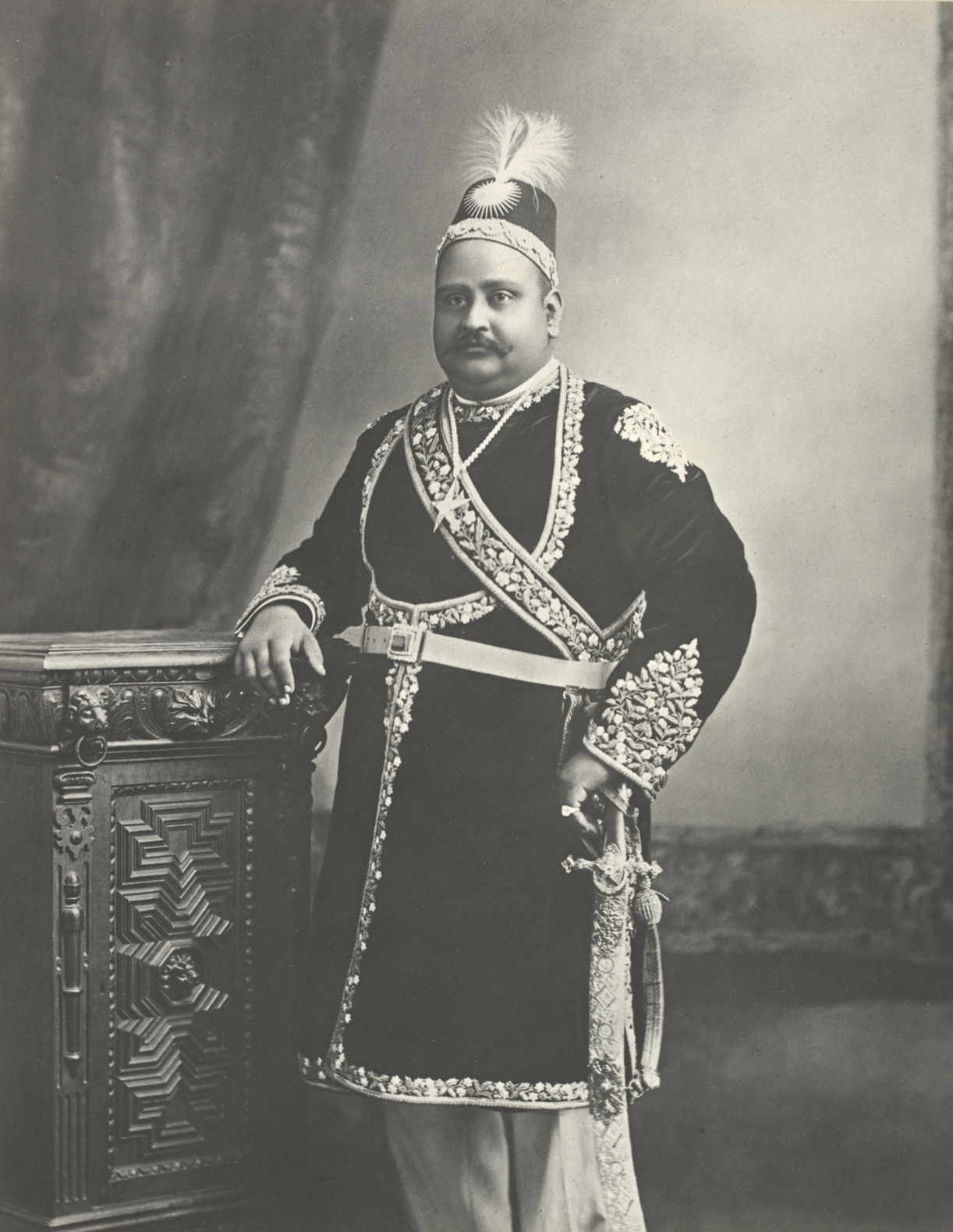

Nawab of Dhaka
- Reign: 1901–1915
- Predecessor: Khwaja Ahsanullah
- Successor: Khwaja Habibullah

President of the All-India Muslim League
- Predecessor: position established
- Successor: Aga Khan III
- Born: 7 June 1871; Dacca, Bengal, British India
- Died: 16 January 1915 (aged 43); Chowringhee, Bengal, British India
- Burial: Khan Mosque Begum Bazaar, Dhaka
- Spouse: Nawab Begum Asmtunnesa; Nawab Begum Alima Bibi; Nawab Begum Raushan Akhter; Nawab Begum Naznijan; Nawab Begum Ayesha; Nawab Begum Azizunnesa
- Issue: Khwaja Habibullah
- House: Dhaka Nawab Family
- Father: Khwaja Ahsanullah
- Mother: Nawab Begum Wahidunnesa
- Religion: Sunni Islam
- Military career
- Allegiance: Dhaka Nawab Estate
- Service years: 1901 - 1915

Nawab Sir Khwaja Salimullah Bahadur GCIE KCSI (7 June 1871 – 16 January 1915) was the fourth Nawab of Dhaka and one of the leading Muslim politicians during the British rule in India. He was born in Ahsan Manzil. Following the family tradition he learnt Arabic, Urdu, Persian and English at home.

On 30 December 1906, the All-India Muslim League was officially founded at the educational conference held in Dhaka.

The convention was held at Ahsan Manzil, the official residence of the Dhaka Nawab Family. Sir Salimullah was a key patron of education for the Eastern Bengal. He was one of the founders of the University of Dhaka and the prestigious Ahsanullah School of Engineering (now the Bangladesh University of Engineering and Technology).

Sir Salimullah was a staunch supporter of the Partition of Bengal and was a member of East Bengal and Assam Legislative Council from 1906 to 1907.

== Politics ==
Salimullah began his career in government service in 1893 as Deputy Magistrate, a position he held until he departed in 1895 to start his business in Mymensingh. In 1901 he inherited the position as the head of the Dhaka Nawab Family following his father's death.

In 1903–04, Nawab Salimullah began supporting the partition of Bengal in the face of opposition of the Indian National Congress. On 16 October 1905, the day the Bengal Province was parted, Salimullah presided over a meeting of Muslim leaders from all over East Bengal in Northbrook Hall where a political front called Mohammedan Provincial Union was formed. With others of the front, Salimullah organized meetings around East Bengal in favor of the partition, while the Congress built up a movement to oppose it. On 14 and 15 April 1906, Salimullah organized and was named president at the first convention of East Bengal and Assam Provincial Educational Conference at Shahbag, Dhaka.

Later that year, newspapers published a dispatch from Salimullah to various Muslim leaders around India urging them to form an all-India political party he called Muslim All India Confederacy, and leaders of the Aligarh Movement requested him to convene the 20th meeting of the All India Mohammedan Educational Conference at his own cost. Over two thousand people covering Muslim leaders from all over India gathered at the Nawab's family garden-house in Shahbag, Dhaka for the conference held between 27 and 30 December 1906. On the last day, the assembly formed the All-India Muslim League, appointing Nawab Salimullah the Vice President and placing him on a committee to craft its constitution. Maulana Mohammad Ali Jauhar wrote the constitution of All-India Muslim League.

Two years later, in December 1908, Salimullah would speak out for free speech in educational institutes and also rights for Muslims to separate elections.

Throughout these years, Salimullah held positions of authority in several leagues and conferences and continued to speak out on important political issues. In 1907, he became president of the All Bengal Muslim League, formed newly Kolkata. In 1908, he became the secretary of the newly established East Bengal and Assam Provincial Muslim League, becoming president in 1909. He served as the chairman at the 22nd Convention of the All India Mohammedan Educational Conference at Amritsar in December 1908. In 1909, he led people of wealth in the newly formed province to form the Imperial League of Eastern Bengal and Assam. In March 1911, at a meeting at the Ahsan Manzil, he presided over a decision to maintain the provincial Muslim League and provincial Educational Conference separate for political and educational activities. On 2 March 1912, Salimullah chaired a meeting at which the two Muslim Leagues of the Bengal were combined into the Presidency Muslim League and the two Muslim Associations were combined into the Bengal Presidency Muslim Association. Salimullah was made president of both the organisations.

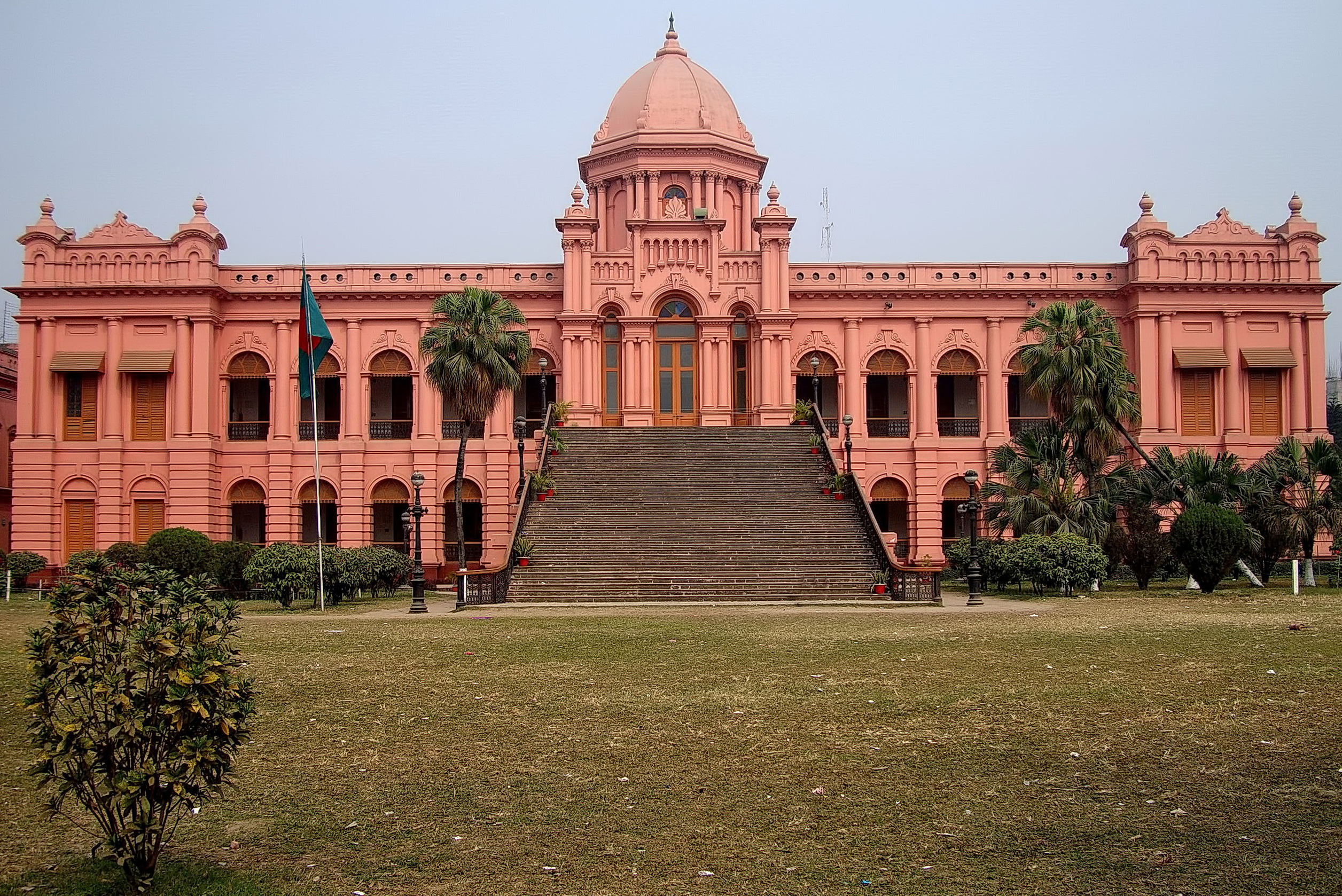
Front view of Ahsan Manzil, Dhaka

In August 1911, Salimullah demanded a university for Dhaka at a function at a political function at Curzon Hall, but it was not until after the shock of the annulment of the partition by George V on 12 December 1911 that Salimullah was able to achieve this goal. Within days of the annulment, Salimullah submitted a list of demands to Viceroy Lord Hardinge to protect the interest of Muslims. In response, a pledge was made to establish a university at Dhaka and to provide for Muslims an education officer, which pledge led to the inclusion of an Islamic Studies Department in Dhaka University. Salimullah continued afterwards to champion this cause, making speeches to counter those who argued against it and, in 1914, organizing a convention on 11–12 April for the Muslim Education Conference of United Bengal.

Along with his continued championing of education, Salimullah's last focuses before withdrawing from active politics in 1914 included situations involving Turkey. In 1912, he raised money from East Bengal to assist Turkish Muslims threatened by the Balkan Wars. During World War I, however, he supported the Allied Powers after Turkey aligned with Germany.

== Honours ==
- Companion of the Order of the Star of India (CSI)-New Year Honours, 1906
- Knight Commander of the Order of the Star of India (KCSI)-New Year Honours, 1909
- Knight Grand Commander of the Order of the Indian Empire (GCIE)-23 December 1911

== Commemorative postage stamp ==
Pakistan Post issued a commemorative postage stamp to honor him in its 'Pioneers of Freedom' series in 1990.

== Personal life ==
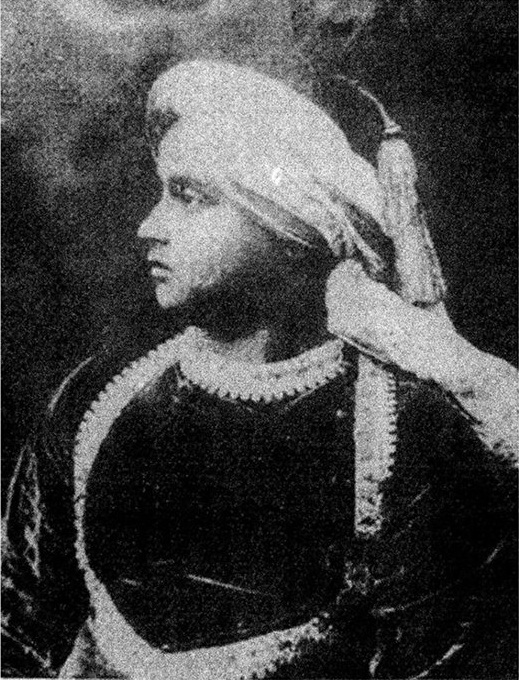
Salimullah as a child (1880)

Khwaja Salimullah was the eldest son of the third Nawab of Dhaka, Sir Khwaja Ahsanullah and his first wife Nawab Begum Wahidunnesa. He was the grandson of Nawab of Dhaka, Sir Khwaja Abdul Ghani. Nawab Khwaja Salimullah was born at the Ahsan Manzil Palace on 7 June 1871.

Wives

- Nawab Begum Asmatunnesa
- Nawab Begum Alima Bibi
- Nawab Begum Raushan Akhter (sister of Wajed Ali Khan Panni)
- Nawab Begum Naznijan
- Nawab Begum Ayesha
- Nawab Begum Azizunnesa

Children

- With Nawab Begum Asmatunnesa:
  - Nawab Khwaja Habibullah
  - Begum Ayesha II
- With Nawab Begum Alima Bibi:
  - Khwaja Alimullah II
  - Khwaja Waliullah
- With Nawab Begum Raushan Akhter:
  - Khwaja Hafizullah I
  - Khwaja Nasrullah
  - Ahmedi Bano
- With Nawab Begum Naznijan:
  - Khurshid Bano
  - Aftab Bano
- With Nawab Begum Azizunnesa:
  - Khwaja Ahsanullah

== Death and legacy ==
Khwaja Salimullah was also a member of Bengal Legislative Assembly from 1913 till his death in Calcutta on 16 January 1915 at the age of 43. Several of Nawab Sir Salimullah's descendants went on to become prominent politicians in the later days of the British Raj and in Pakistan. They include one of his sons Khwaja Nasrullah who was the Governor of Calcutta, his grandson Sir Khwaja Nazimuddin who was the second Prime Minister of Pakistan, his grandson Khwaja Hassan Askari who became a Member of the National Assembly of Pakistan and also another grandson of his and The 5th Nawab's 3rd son Nawabzada Khawaja Tofeal Ahmed. He had played a role in bringing freedom to Bangladesh. Khawaja Tofeal Ahmed was a member of Awami league and was elected as Dhaka's MP in 1971 but he was shot in front of his greenhouse on 18 February 1972.

Other family members also became prominent political figures.

Several places in Bangladesh have been dedicated in Sir Salimullah's name. They include most notably the following:

- Salimullah Muslim Hall, University of Dhaka
- Sir Salimullah Medical College, Dhaka
- Salimullah Muslim Orphanage
- Nawab Salimullah Road, Naryanganj

In 1990 the Pakistani government launched commemorative postage stamps honouring Sir Salimullah as one of the Pioneers of Freedom. In 1993 the Bangladeshi government launched a commemorative postage stamp in honour of Sir Salimullah.

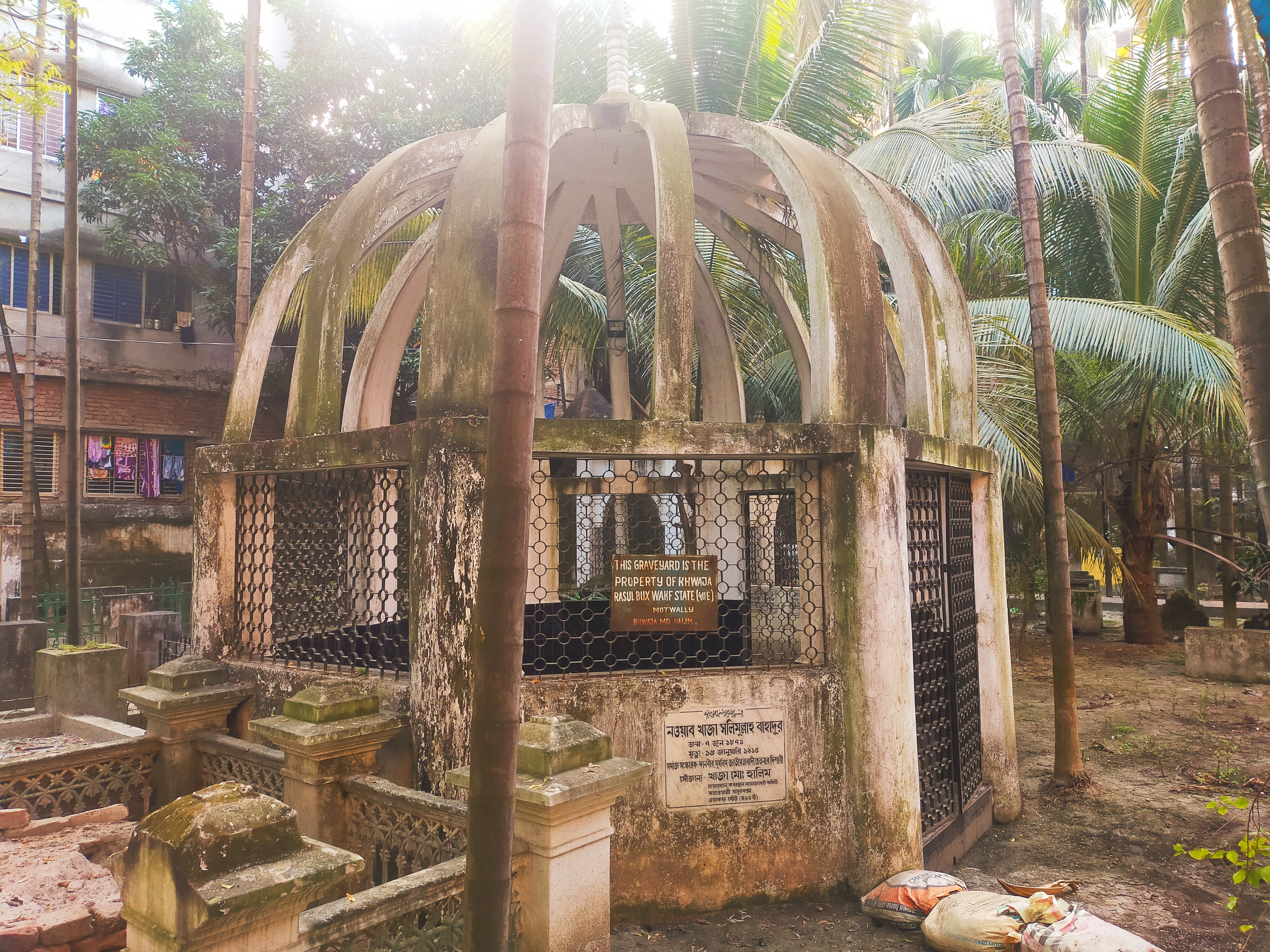
Grave of Nawab Salimullah in the graveyard of Nawab family, KM Azam Lane, Begum Bazar, Dhaka, Bangladesh
