= History of Dhaka =

History of the capital city of Bangladesh

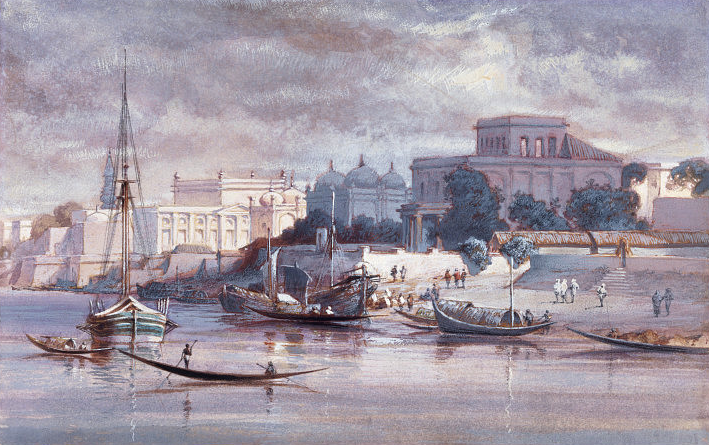
Dhaka City across Buriganga River – a painting by Frederick William Alexander de Fabeck in 1861

Dhaka (Dacca) is a modern megacity with origins dating from 500 BC to 200 BC. The history of Dhaka region begins with the existence of urbanised settlements that were ruled by the Gupta Empire, Gauda Kingdom, Pala Empire, and Chandra dynasty before passing to the control of the Sena dynasty in the 10th century CE. After the reign of the Sena dynasty, the region was ruled by the Hindu Deva dynasty of Bikrampur.

Dhaka was successively ruled by the Turkic and Afghan governors descending from the Delhi Sultanate, followed by the Bengal Sultanate, before the arrival of the Mughals in 1608. The city became proto-industrialised and was declared the capital of Mughal Bengal and commercial (financial) capital of Mughal India. The Dhaka natural riverine port has a recorded existence since the 16th century CE. Dhaka's strategic riverine location in Bengal made it a hub for Eurasian traders, including Armenians, Portuguese, French, Dutch, and British. The bustling old city was known as the Venice of the East. After the Mughals, the British ruled the region for 200 years until the independence of India in 1947. After the independence of Bangladesh in 1971, Dhaka became the capital of the new state.

== Etymology ==
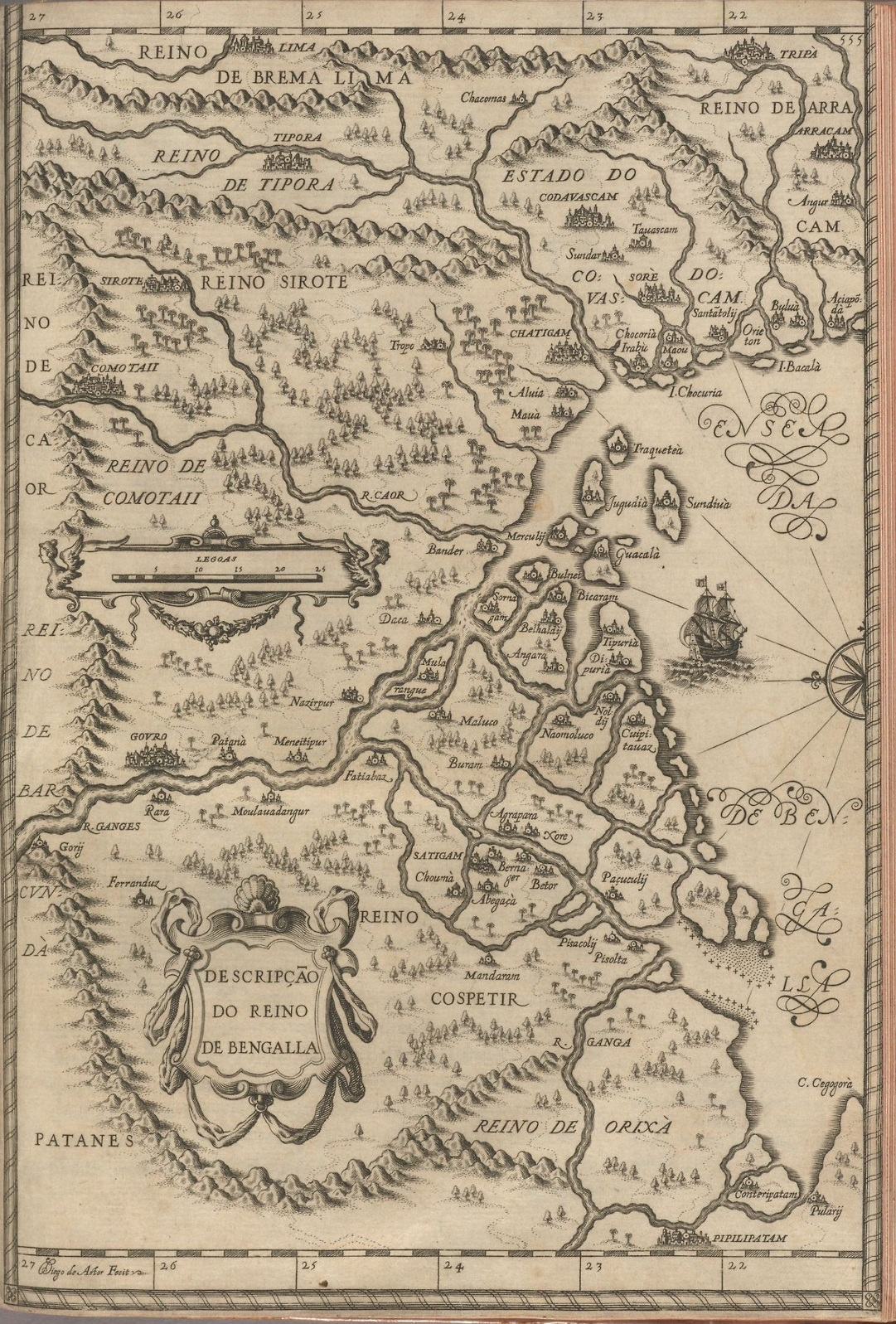
1550 map by Joao de Barros — the first map where reference to Dhaka is found. (North is to the left, Daca is marked in the middle)

The earliest written mention of Dhaka occurs in a map in the book Décadas da Ásia (Decades of Asia) by Portuguese historian João de Barros. Dated 1550 CE, during the Sultanate period, it reads "Daca" in the present day region of Dhaka. There is no definitive origin story of the name, but there are various theories:

- The name came following the establishment of Dhakeshwari temple, built by Raja Ballal Sena in the 12th century, and Dhakeswari is the name of Goddess Durga. Dhakeshwari may also mean Goddess of Dhaka; so the temple might have been named after the region.
- Dhak (a membranophone instrument) is used as part of the Durga Puja festival in this temple.
- The plant named Dhak (Butea monosperma), which was widely found in that area.
- In the 4th century, the poet laureate Harisena mentioned Davaka as an eastern frontier of the Gupta Empire, in the Prayag Prashasti inscription on the Allahabad Pillar, as a eulogy for the Gupta Emperor Samudragupta.
- Rajatarangini, written by a Kashmiri Brahman, Kalhana, says the region was originally known as Dhakka. The word Dhakka means watchtower. Bikrampur and Sonargaon — the earlier strongholds of Bengal rulers were situated nearby. So Dhaka was likely used as the watchtower for the fortification purpose.
- A dialect of the Prakrit language is called Dhaka Bhasa.

== Early history ==
The Greater Dhaka region was under the kingdom of Vanga and Gangaridai in the early ancient period. Archaeological excavations in 2017–2018 inside the former Old Dhaka Central Jail on Nazimuddin Road in Old Dhaka revealed some glazed and rolled potteries that are similar to what were found in ancient Mahasthangarh and, Wari-Bateshwar ruins in Bangladesh, and other ruins in India, Malaysia, Indonesia, and Cambodia. This suggests Dhaka was inhabited at least from 500 BC to 200 BC.

== Kamarupa kingdom ==
The Kamarupa kingdom, also known as Pragjyotisa, existed between 350 and 1140 CE. According to the 17th-century chronicle of Yogini Tantra, the southern boundary of the kingdom stretched up to the junction of the Brahmaputra River and Shitalakshya River which covered the Dhaka region.

== Pala Empire ==
The Pāla Empire (r. 750–1161 CE) was an imperial power during the post-classical period in the Indian subcontinent, which originated in the Varendra subregion of Bengal. After the fall of Shashanka's Gauda kingdom, the Bengal region was in a state of anarchy. There was no central authority, and there was constant struggle between petty chieftains. The contemporary writings describe this situation as matsya nyaya ("fish justice" i.e., a situation where the big fish eat the small fish). Gopala ascended the throne as the first Pala king during these times. The Khalimpur copper plate suggests that the prakriti (people) of the region made him the king. It is named after its ruling dynasty, whose rulers bore names ending with the suffix Pāla ("protector" in Prakrit). The empire was founded with the election of Gopāla as the emperor of Gauda in the late eighth century CE. The Pala Empire ruled the whole Bengal region after the fall of King Shashanka's Gauda Kingdom. During the reign of Pala rulers, from the 8th century until the late 11th century, Bikrampur, a region located in greater Dhaka district, was one of their capitals. The Pala rulers were mostly Shaivite and Buddhists. But the majority of subjects of Buddhist rulers were Hindu.

== Chandra kingdom ==
A stone statue of Nateshwar, a depiction of dancing Shiva on the back of his bull-carrier Nandi, was found at Sarangadhar Jeu Akhada, a monastery in the Chowkbazar Thana area of Dhaka, in 2011. The Nateshwar was a prominent symbol in art from the period of the Chandra dynasty in the 10th and 11th centuries. The dynasty ruled from its capital in Mainamati and later in Bikrampur, near Dhaka.

== Sena kingdom ==
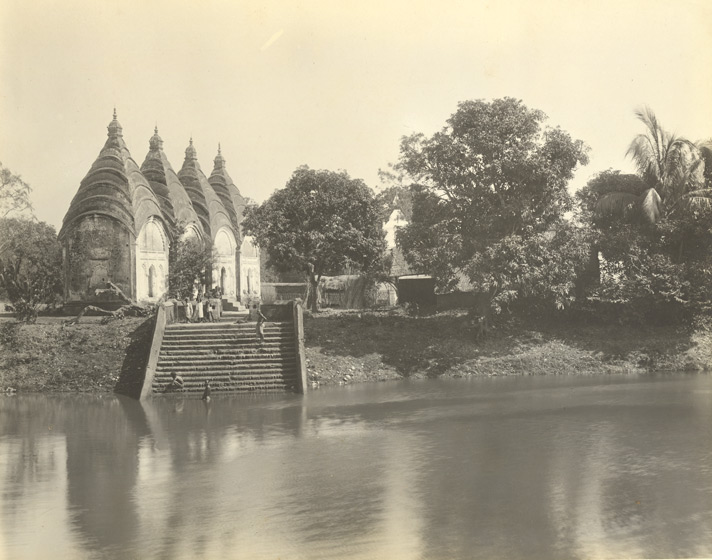
Dhakeshwari Temple in 1904

The Sena dynasty's founder, Hemanta Sena, was part of the Pala dynasty until their empire began to weaken. He usurped power and styled himself king in 1095 CE. Then a largely Hindu community populated the lower Dhaka region. According to historian Ahmad Hasan Dani, the weavers (tantis) and the shell cutters (sankharis) are the oldest inhabitants of the city. Shankhari Bazaar (shell cutters' market), Tanti Bazaar (weavers' market), Laksmi Bazaar, and Bangla Bazaar were the market centers. The row houses of those two areas had a narrow frontage of 6 to 10 feet, a depth of 30 to 40 feet, and a height of up to 4 stories. Other localities of craftsmen and businessmen include Kumartoli (potters' locality), Patuatuli (jute-silk painters' area), Sutrapur (carpenters' area), Bania Nagar (traders' area), Jalua Nagar (fishermen's area), Bania Nagar, and Goal Nagar. According to a popular belief, Dhakeshwari Temple was built by Ballal Sena, the second Sena ruler. Another tradition says there were fifty-two bazaars and fifty-three streets, and the region acquired the name of "Baunno Bazaar O Teppun Gulli".

Raja Danauja Rai was one of the last Hindu rulers who had reigned over the eastern Bengal region (including Dhaka) from Sonargaon. In 1302, he was defeated by Turkic ruler Shamsuddin Firuz Shah who had started to expand his kingdom from Lakhnauti in western Bengal.

== Sultanate period ==
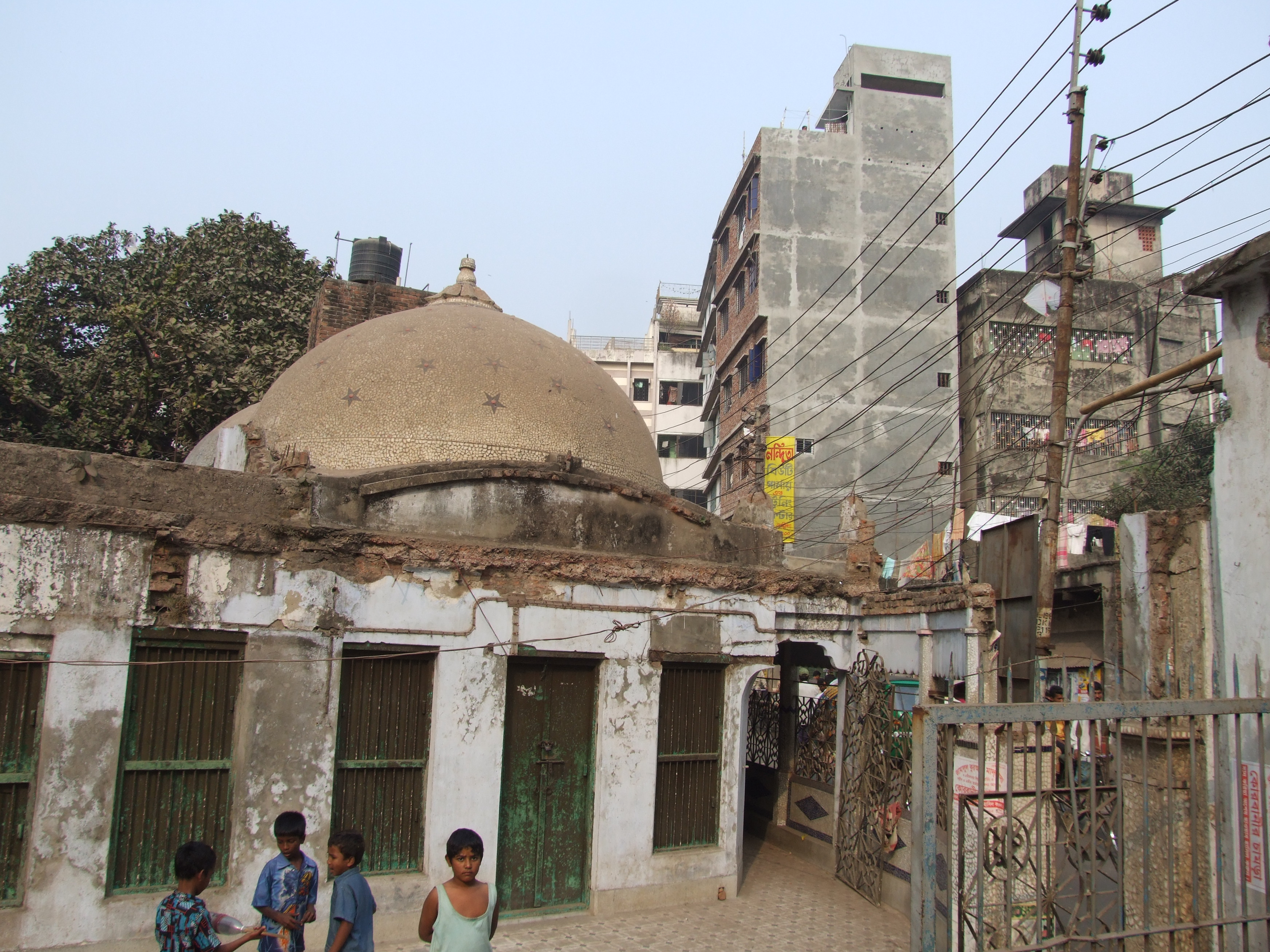
Binat Bibi Mosque (built 1454) – the earliest known mosque surviving in Dhaka

Upon arrival of Islam in this region, Turkic and Afghan rulers reigned the area until the late 16th century.

At the defeat of the independent Turkic ruler of Bengal Ghiyasuddin Bahadur Shah in 1324 by the Delhi Sultan Ghiyath al-Din Tughluq's army, Dhaka went under the rule of the Delhi Sultanate for the first time. But it largely stayed within independent Bengal Sultanate from 1338 until 1576 under rulers of different dynasties including Fakhruddin Mubarak Shah, Shamsuddin Ilyas Shah, Alauddin Hussain Shah, Sher Shah Suri, and Muhammad Khan Sur.

In 1412, Shah Ali Baghdadi, a saint arrived in Delhi and then came to Dhaka where he became a disciple of Shah Bahar of the Chishti Order. His shrine still exists in present-day Mirpur Thana area.

Binat Bibi Mosque was built in 1454 at Narinda area of Dhaka during the reign of the Sultan of Bengal, Nasiruddin Mahmud Shah (r. 1435–1459). It is the oldest brick structure that still exists in the city.

An Afghan fort (also known as Old Fort of Dhaka; now-defunct Old Dhaka Central Jail) was built during this period. 17th-century historian Mirza Nathan described the fort in his book Baharistan-i-Ghaibi as "surrounded by mud walls and the largest and strongest in pre-Mughal era". According to the inscription found near the fort, the gate of Naswallagali Mosque was renovated in 1459.

An inscription found in a mosque at Saptagram, West Bengal (around 220 km from Dhaka) says "the son of a revenue officer of Dhaka, established the mosque in 1467".

Daud Khan Karrani of Karrani dynasty was the last independent ruler of Bengal Sultanate who had control over Dhaka until 1576.

== Mughal rule and rise as the capital of Bengal ==
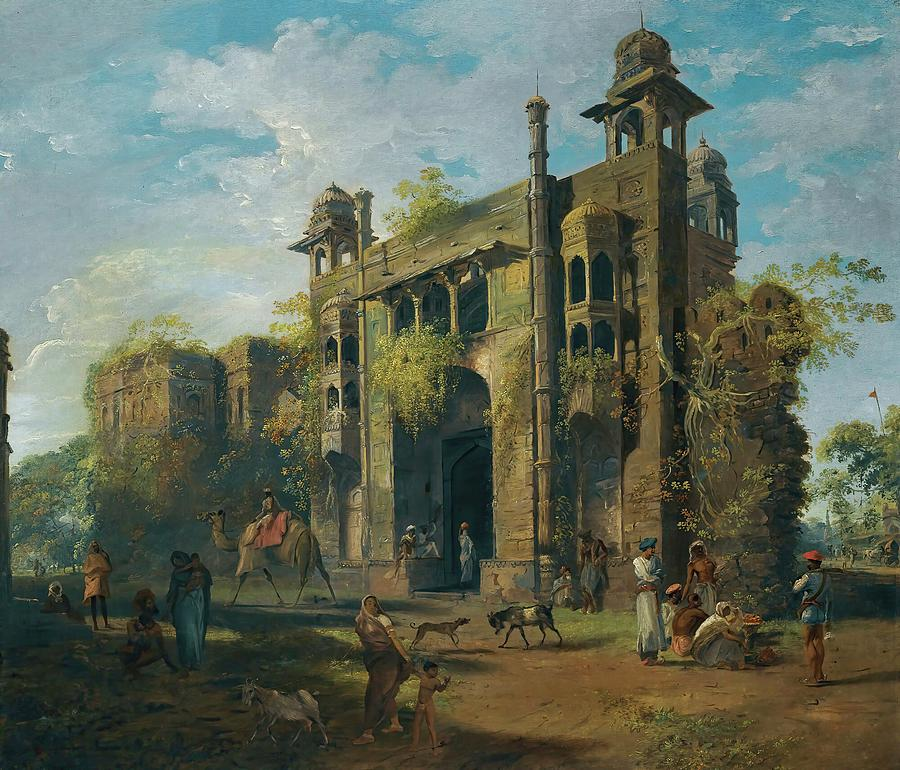
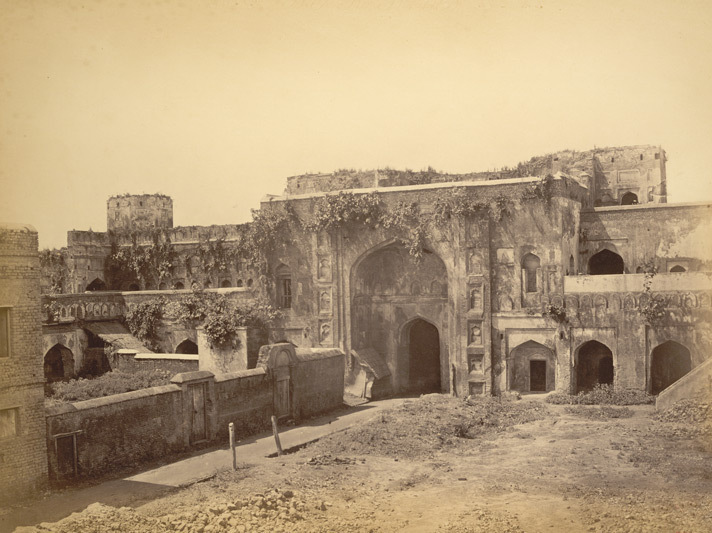
Left: Earliest painting of Lalbagh Fort by Johan Zoffany in 1787 Right: Earliest photograph of Bara Katra in 1875

The Bengal Sultanate came into the domain of the Mughal Empire during the reign of Emperor Akbar after the Battle of Tukaroi (1575) and the Battle of Rajmahal (1576), defeating the Karrani dynasty. But Dhaka was situated in the Bhati region of Bengal, which hosted several rebel forces led by Isa Khan (1529–1599) of Bara-Bhuiyans from mid to late 16th century. Raja Man Singh, the general of Akbar, stayed in Dhaka during 1602–1604 to fight against the Bara-Bhuiyan rebels. Singh built the four Siva temples at the site of the ruined original Dhakeshwari Temple. After the next leader of Bara-Bhuiyans, Musa Khan, was subdued by Mughal General Islam Khan Chisti in 1608, Dhaka went directly under the control of the Mughals. It was referred to as a thana (a military outpost).

The newly appointed subahdar of Bengal Subah, Islam Khan, transferred the capital from Rajmahal to Dhaka in 1610. He also renamed Dhaka as Jahangirnagar (City of Jahangir) after the Emperor Jahangir. Due to its location right beside some main river routes, Dhaka was an important centre for business. The muslin fabric was produced and traded in this area. He successfully crushed the regional revolts in Jessore, Bakla (present-day Barisal), and Bhulua (present-day Noakhali) and brought almost the entire province under the Mughal domain.

Subahdar Ibrahim Khan Fath-i-Jang (r. 1617–1624) began the construction of a fort (at the premise of Old Dhaka Central Jail). Rebel prince Shah Jahan defeated and killed him in 1624, and when he entered Dhaka, "all the elephants, horses, and 4,000,000 rupees in specie belonging to the Government were delivered to him". After a short stay, he then moved to Patna.

Appointed in 1639 as the next Bengal subahdar, Prince Shuja built Bara Katra between 1644 and 1646 in Dhaka to serve as his official residence. In 1642, Hussaini Dalan, a Shia shrine, was built by Mir Murad. The Idgah was constructed by Mir Abul Qasim, Diwan of Shuja, in 1640, and Churihatta Mosque by Muhammad Beg in 1650. In the late 1640s, for personal and political reasons, he moved the capital back to Rajmahal. Dhaka became a subordinate station.

Due to political turmoil, Emperor Aurangzeb sent Mir Jumla to deal with Prince Shuja. He pursued Shuja up to Dhaka and reached the city on 9 May 1660. But Shuja had already fled to the Arakan region. As Jumla was ordered to become the next subahdar of Bengal Subah, Dhaka was again made the capital of the region. He was engaged in construction activities in Dhaka and its suburbs – two roads, two bridges, and a network of forts. A fort at Tangi-Jamalpur guarded one of the roads connecting Dhaka with the northern districts, which is now known as Mymensingh Road. He built Mir Jumla Gate at the northern border to defend the city from the attacks of Magh pirates. Italian traveller Niccolao Manucci came to Dhaka in 1662–63. According to him, Dhaka had many inhabitants compared to the size of the city. Most of the houses were built of straw. There were only two kuthis – one of the English and the other of the Dutch. Ships were loaded with fine white cotton and silk fabrics. Many Christians and white and black Portuguese resided in Dhaka.

Thomas Bowrey, a British merchant sailor, visited Dhaka in the 1670s. In his book, A Geographical Account of Countries Round the Bay of Bengal, he mentioned:

The City of Dhaka is a very large, spacious one, but stands on low, marshy, swampy ground, and the water of that ground is very brackish, which is the only inconvenience. It has, however, some very fine conveniences that compensate, having a very fine and large river that runs close by the city walls, navigable by ships of 500 or 600 tonnes burden. The water of the river, being an arm of the Ganges, is extraordinarily good, but is some distance for fetching and carrying for some residents of the city, the city being not less than 40 English miles in circumference. It is an admirable city for its greatness, for its magnificent buildings, and the multitude of its inhabitants. A very great and potent, permanent, and paid army is based here, in a constant state of readiness. Also, many large, strong, and stately elephants, trained for battle, which are kept close to the palace.

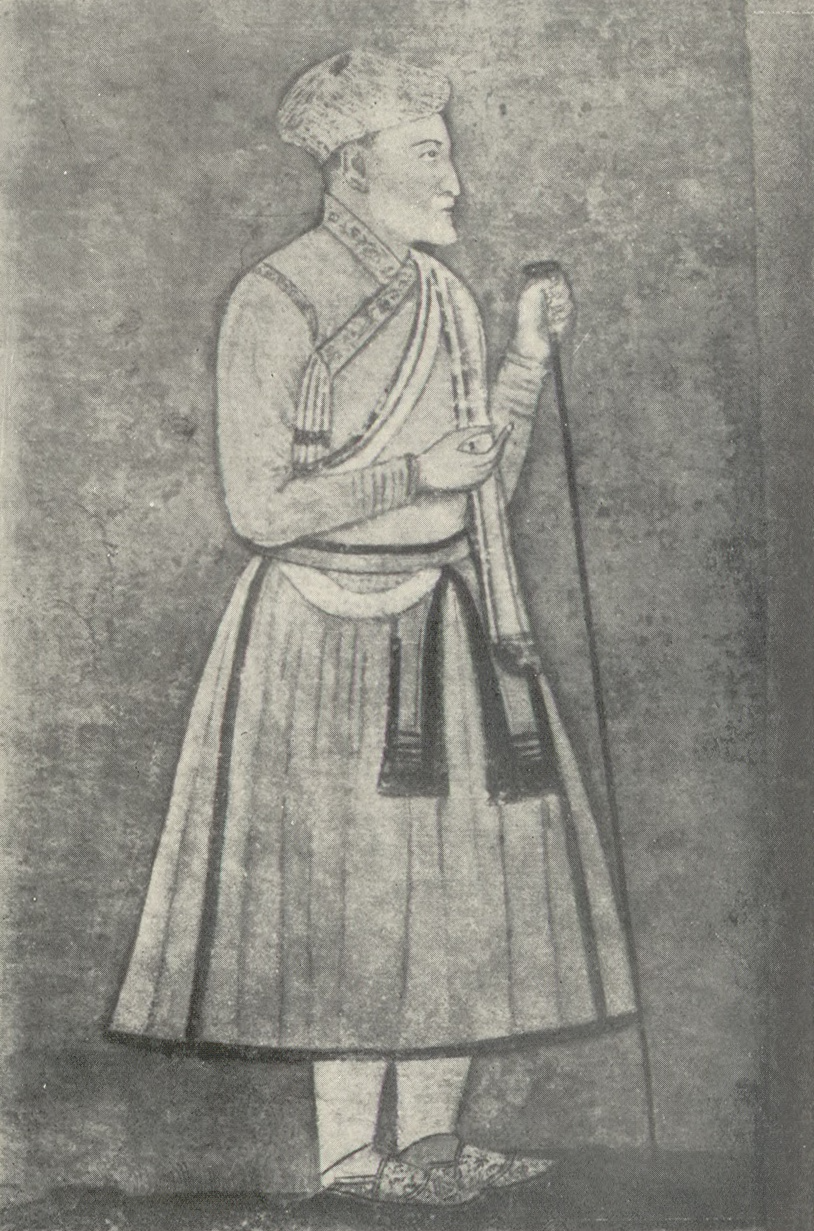
Shaista Khan, governor of Bengal (1664–1688)

Construction of Lalbagh Fort was commenced in 1678 by Prince Muhammad Azam during his 15-month-long governorship of Bengal, but before the work could be completed, he was recalled by Emperor Aurangzeb.

The largest expansion of the city took place under the next Mughal subahdar, Shaista Khan (1664–1688). The city then stretched for 12 miles in length and 8 miles in breadth and had a population of nearly a million people. The Babubazar Mosque, Choto Katra (1664), Chawk Mosque (1676), and Sat Gambuj Mosque (circa 1680) were built during this period. Khan built tombs for Bibi Pari, Bibi Champa, and Dara Begum. A French physician and traveller, François Bernier, visited Dhaka in 1664 and recorded his memories in his book Voyages dans les États du Grand Mogol. Another French traveller, Jean-Baptiste Tavernier, arrived in Dhaka on 13 January 1666 and met Khan. He referred to Khan as "the uncle of King Aurangzeb and the cleverest man in all his kingdom". In 1682, William Hedges, the first agent and governor for the affairs of the East India Company in the Bay of Bengal, visited Dhaka on 25 October and met Khan to acquire perwannas. He left Dhaka on 15 December after a total stay of 51 days. Francis Bradley Bradley-Birt, an English writer, wrote in his 1906 book The Romance of an Eastern Capital – "It is truly the city of Shaista Khan".

Prince Azim-ush-Shan became the subahdar of Bengal Subah in 1697. Due to conflict with Diwan Murshid Quli Khan, he transferred the capital from Dhaka to Rajmahal and then to Patna in 1703. Murshid Khan also shifted his office to Mauksusabad (later renamed it to Murshidabad). During his administration, the Kartalab Khan Mosque in the present-day Begum Bazar area was built during 1701–1704. Mirdha Mosque was built in 1704–1705 in the Atish Khana Mahalla area.

=== Economy ===
Under the Mughal Empire, Bengal was an affluent region with a Bengali Hindu majority and Bengali Muslim minority. According to economic historian Indrajit Ray, it was globally prominent in industries such as textile manufacturing and shipbuilding.

=== Portuguese settlements ===
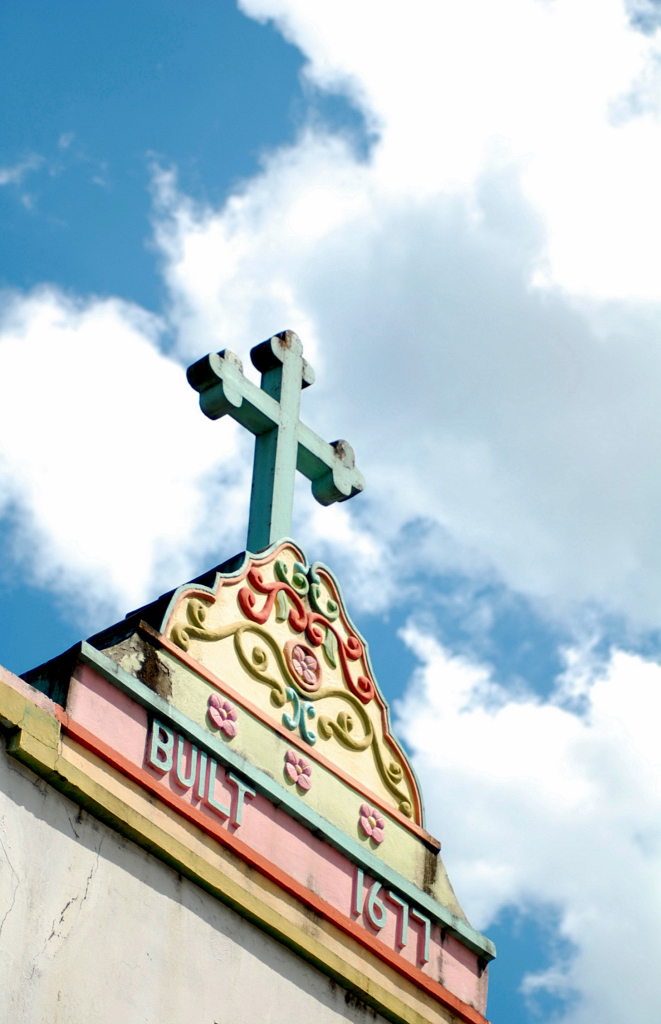
Holy Rosary Church in Tejgaon, built by Portuguese missionaries in 1677

In Bengal region, the Portuguese made the principal trading centre in Hooghly. Besides, they made small settlements in Dhaka in about 1580. Ralph Fitch, an English traveller, recorded in 1586 that Portuguese traders were involved in shipping rice, cotton, and silk goods. Tavernier mentioned churches built in Dhaka by Portuguese Augustinian missionaries. In 1840, James Taylor, the civil surgeon of Dhaka, wrote that the oldest existing Portuguese structure today, the Church of Our Lady of Rosary in Tejgaon, was built in 1599 by the missionaries. But according to historian Ahmad Hasan Dani, it was built in 1677. Joaquim Joseph A. Campos, an editor of the Asiatic Society of Bengal, mentioned other Portuguese churches in Dhaka – the Church of St. Nicholas of Tolentino, the Church of the Holy Ghost, and the Church of our Lady Piety. The Portuguese officially established a mission in Dhaka in 1616.

Sebastien Manrique, a Portuguese missionary and traveler, visited Dhaka in September 1640 and spent about 27 days around the area. According to him, the city extended along the Buriganga river for over four and a half miles from Maneswar to Narinda and Fulbaria. Christian communities lived around these suburbs in the west, east, and north. He further mentioned, "a small but beautiful church with a convent" in Dhaka. In his words,

This is the chief city in Bengala and the seat of the principal Nababo or viceroy, appointed by the emperor, who bestowed this viceroyalty, on several occasions, on one of his sons. It stands in a wide and beautiful plain on the banks of the famous and here fructifying Ganges river, beside which the City stretches for over a league and a half.

In his conquest of Chittagong from the Arakanese (1665–1666), Shaista Khan received 40 ships from the Portuguese for his naval fleet. A section of the Portuguese came from Sandwip and Arakan and settled on the bank of the Ichamati River (about 25 kilometres (16 mi) south of Dhaka) at the present-day Muktarpur–Mirkadim area in Munshiganj, which bears its historical name of Feringhi Bazar. They were mainly involved in the salt trade.

In 1713, priest Anthony Barbier spent Christmas at a church in Narinda, a neighborhood in Dhaka. In the 1780 map of English geographer James Rennell, the Portuguese settlers in Dhaka were in proximity to that church (present-day Narinda-Laxmibazar area).

=== Nawab era ===
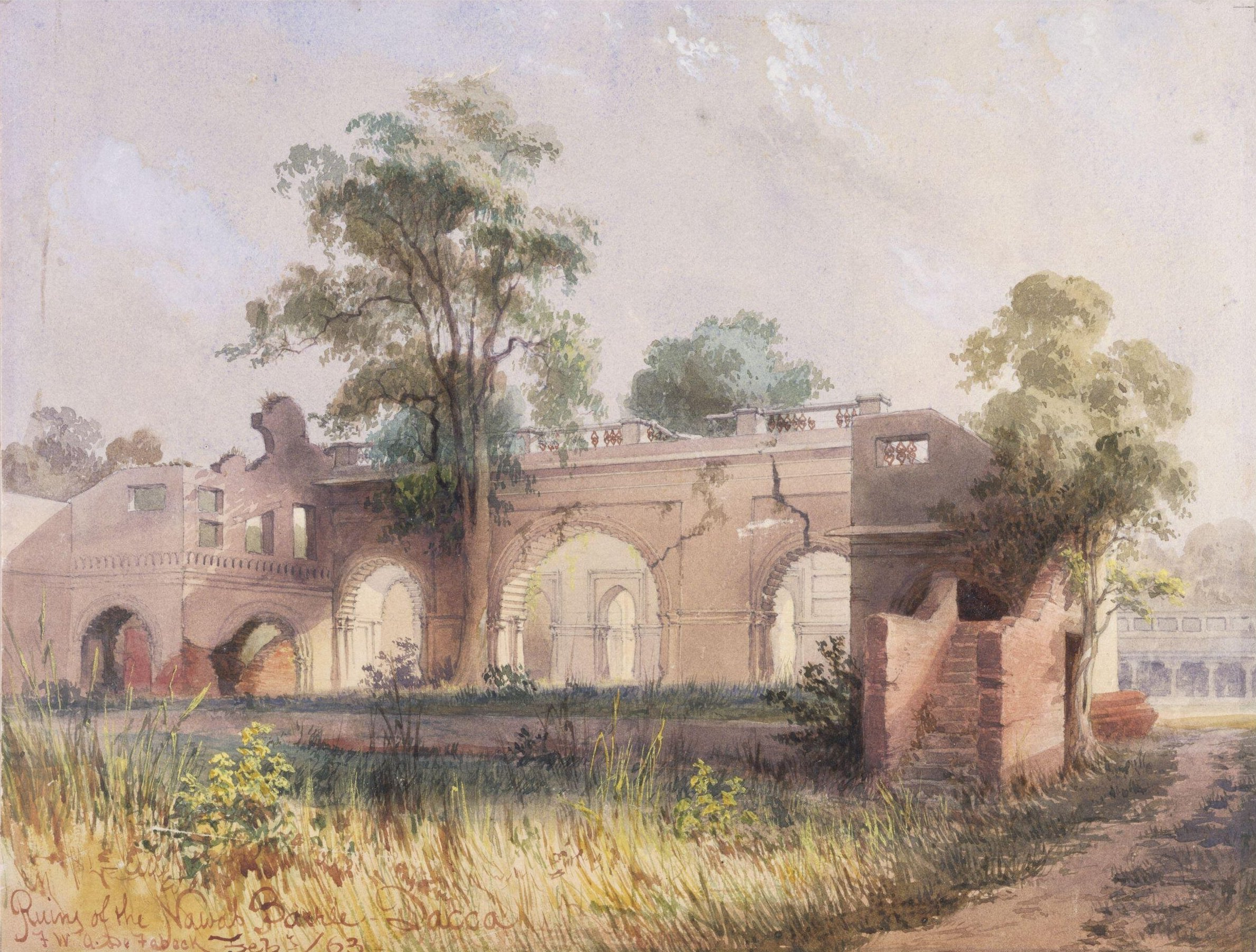
Ruins of Nimtali Kuthi - a 1863 watercolor painting by Frederick William Alexander de Fabeck

Around 1716–1717, Murshid Quli Khan became the Nazim (Governor) of Bengal and Orissa, ruling the region from Murshidabad. The position of Naib Nazim (deputy governor) was created to administer the region of eastern Bengal from Dhaka, known as Dhaka Niabat. They were directly appointed by the governor. The first Naib Nazim of Dhaka was Khan Muhammad Ali Khan. The period 1716–1757, from the reign of Murshid Quli Khan to Sirajuddaula, is referred to as the Nawabi Era. The last governor, Sirajuddaula, lost control to the British in the Battle of Plassey in 1757. Since then the office of Naib Nazim of Dhaka was held by one favored by the Fort William Council. It was shorn of revenue and administrative powers from 1765 to 1822, holding only the title and a small allowance from 1822 to 1843. The last Naib Naim Ghaziuddin Haider, known as Pagla Nawab, died without leaving any heir in 1843, and the title of Naib Nazim became extinct.

The Naib Nazims initially resided in Islam Khan's fort (now located in the premises of the Old Dhaka Central Jail). After the British took control of the fort, the Naib Nazims moved to the Bara Katra (Great Caravenserai Palace). In 1766, the Nimtali Kuthi became the official residence of the Naib Nazims. Besides the Nimtali Kuthi, two other notable constructions during the period were Chowk Bazaar, built by Naib Nazim Mirza Lutfullah in 1728, and the Armanitola Mosque in 1735.

=== Armenian settlements ===
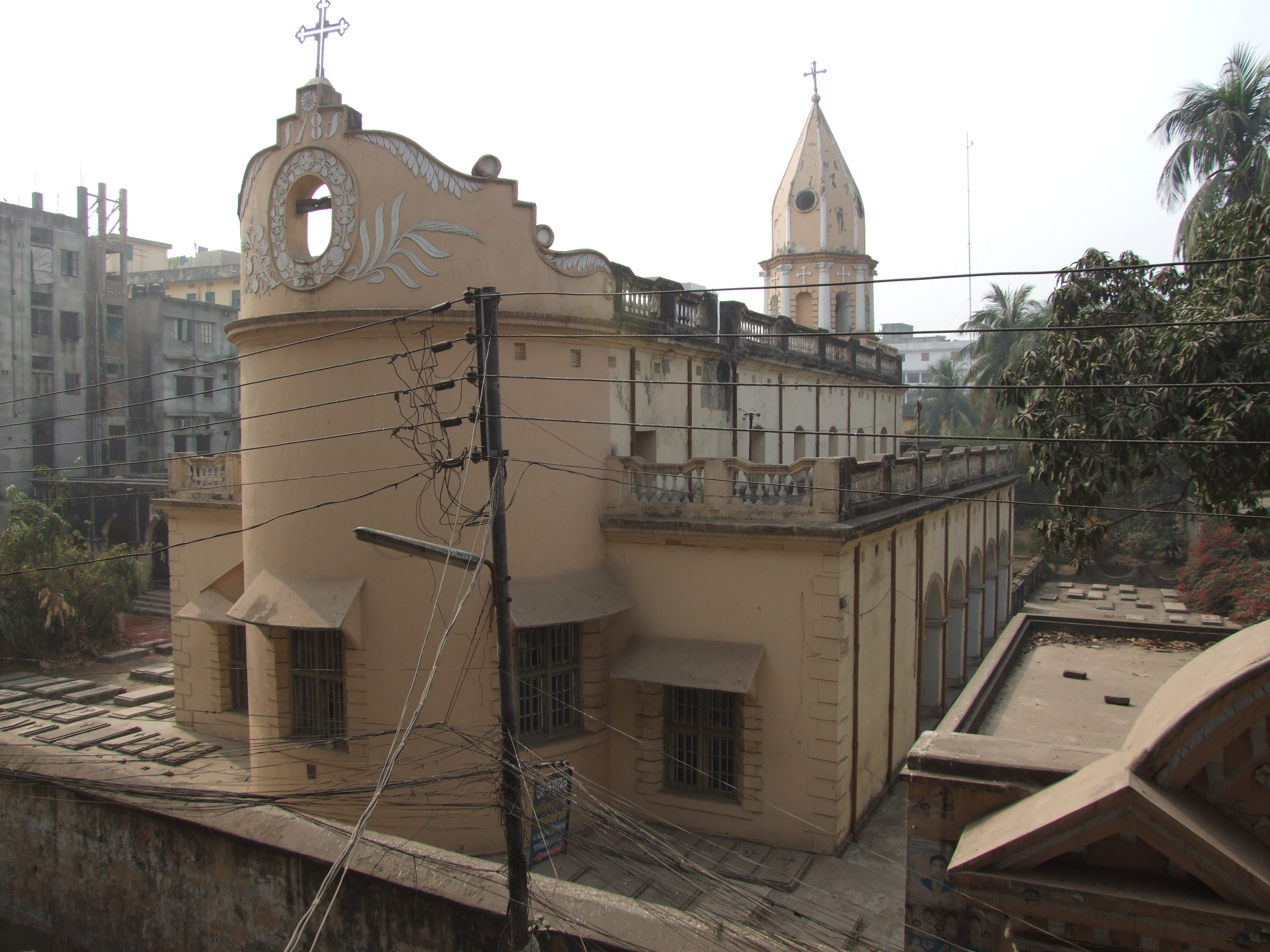
Armenian Church built in 1781

The Armenians settled in Dhaka in the early 18th century. They established trade ties in jute and leather with Mughals and Nawabs. The Armenian Church (Church of Holy Resurrection) built in 1781 in Armanitola area bears the evidence of their presence. Since the British started ruling Bengal in 1757, Armenians slowly moved out of this area. The Pogose School, the first private school in Dhaka, was founded in the 1830s by Nicholas Pogose, an Armenian merchant. English educational and social reformer Mary Carpenter visited Dhaka in December 1875, hosted by the Pogose family. The last surviving Armenian, Michael Joseph Martin (Mikel Housep Martirossian), also the last resident warden of the Armenian Church, left Dhaka by 2018.

=== Post Armenian settlements: Muslim Elites in Dacca ===
During this period a vast property in Armanitola and Becharam Dewry had been bought by Khan Bahadur Mohammad Nazem Chowdhury and his younger brother Mohammad Kazem Chowdhury from Armenians. Khan Bahadur Nazem Chowdhury became Sadr e Ala (Chief judge of greater Dhaka and Mymensing) in 1846 by the British Raj with Gazette from released from Calcutta. Both brothers are holding vast Zamindari across Easter Bengal in Dhaka, Brahminbaria, Comilla, Chandpur, Tripura, Noakhali areas. Abul Muzaffar Abdullah was elder son of Khan Bahadur Nazem was also Legal Pleader and Zaminder and most prominent elites of Dhaka. He was a scholar as well and reviewed Quran Translation of Girish Chandra Sen. Abdullahpur in Keraniganj is after his name. Their relatives are among Sonargaon Zaminders, Srifaltali Zaminders, Dhaka Nawabs and other prominent elite Muslim zaminders in subcontinent. Abdullah Jame Masjid was built by him in Becharam Dewry. Asudegan-e-Dhaka by Hekim Habibur Rahman mentioned about this family and in other books on History of Dhaka.

== British East India Company rule (1793–1857) ==
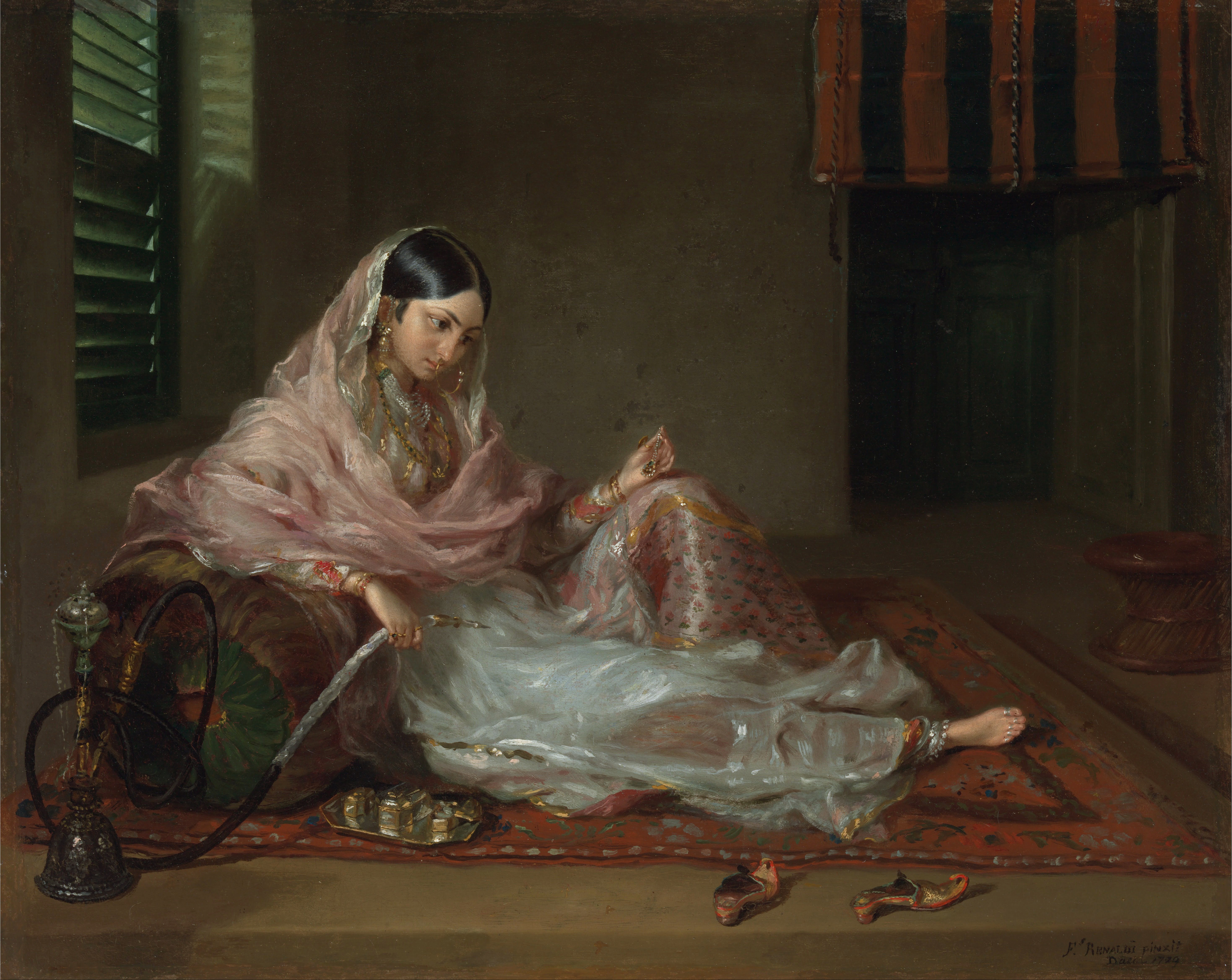
Francesco Renaldi's 1789 oil-canvas painting of a Bengali woman wearing muslin in Dhaka

The English formally established their factories in Dhaka in 1668. Their factory stood in the present-day Dhaka College campus while the French factory in the present-day Ahsan Manzil premise and the Dutch factory in today's Mitford Hospital area. The English traders were already in the city as early as in 1666 when Tavernier visited.

In 1763, the English factory was threatened by the troops of the Nawab Mir Qasim, along with roaming bands of Fakirs and Sanyasis. Provincial Council at Fort William in Calcutta dispatched Captain Archibald Swinton (1731–1804) to Dhaka and he secured the factory with help from Captain Grant from Chittagong and sepoys. He left Dhaka on 4 August 1763 after 2 months to settle issues. After the Battle of Buxar in 1765, per the Treaty of Allahabad, East India Company was appointed the imperial tax collector of the province Bengal-Bihar-Orissa by the Mughal emperor. Swinton was dispatched again to take over the local administration in Dhaka. Before he left the position in October 1775, he started to plan and build the Nimtali Kuthi, a palace-complex for the Naib Nazim. It was completed in 1766.

The Company took complete control in 1793 when Nizamat (Mughal appointed governorship) was abolished. The city then became known by its anglicised name, Dacca. Owing to the war, the city's population shrank dramatically in a short period of time. Although an important city in the Bengal province, Dhaka remained smaller than Kolkata, which served as the capital of British India for a long period of time. Under British rule, many modern educational institutions, public works and townships were developed. A modern water supply system was introduced in 1874 and electricity supply in 1878. The Dhaka Cantonment was established near the city, serving as a base for the soldiers of the British Indian Army. Dhaka served as a strategic link to the frontier of the northeastern states of Tripura and Assam.

Charles D'Oyly was the District Collector of Dhaka from 1808 to 1811. He made a good collection of painting folios of Dhaka in the book, Antiquities of Dacca. These paintings exhibited much of the ruins of Dhaka from the Mughal era. Short historical accounts of all the paintings was appended. James Atkinson wrote these accounts, accompanied by engravings done by Landseer.

In 1824, an English bishop Reginald Heber visited Dhaka and met Shamsuddaula (r. 1822–1831), the-then Naib-Nazim of Dhaka, at Nimtali Kuthi. He also met Shamsuddaula's courtier Mir Ashraf Ali. On 10 July, Heber inaugurated St Thomas Church (built in 1821). His personal chaplain, Martin Stowe, fell ill and died during this visit.

In 1835, Dhaka College was established as an English school by the then Civil Surgeon Dr. James Taylor. It received the college status in 1841. Local Muslim and Hindu students as well as Armenians and Portuguese were among the first graduates.

Horse-driven carriages were introduced in Dhaka as public transport in 1856. The number of carriages increased from 60 in 1867 to 600 in 1889.

=== Rise of Dhaka Nawab Estate ===
Under the Permanent Settlement of Bengal enactment by Charles Cornwallis in 1793, the Company government and the Bengali zamindars agreed to fix revenues to be raised from land. As a result, Dhaka Islampur Nawab Estate grew to become one of the largest zamindari in Eastern Bengal by buying other zamindari estates in Barisal and in greater Dhaka. It was founded by Kashmir origin merchant Khwaja Hafizullah Kashmiri and his nephew Khwaja Alimullah. This Family was settled in Sylhet and later Begum Bazar in Dhaka. The family was proprietary of the Dhaka Nawab estate, seated at Ahsan Manzil palace. "Nawab of Dhaka" was the title of the head of family and estate from 1843. Although the Nawabs of Dhaka were not sovereigns, they played an essential role in the politics of South Asia—and the relations with external entities. A French trading centre is converted as the residence of the Dhaka Nawabs in 1830. It was later constructed into a palace and named Ahsan Manzil. The estate paid Rs 320,964 as per agreement to the Company government in 1904. In 1952 the Estate was abolished according to the East Bengal Estate Acquisition and Tenancy Act.

== British Raj rule (1858–1947) ==
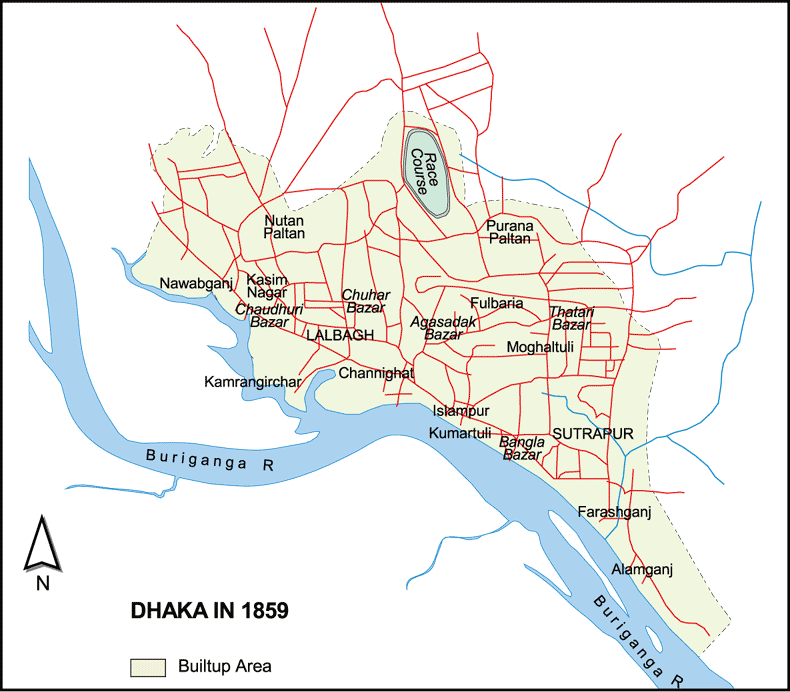
Dhaka in 1859

During the Indian Rebellion of 1857 (also known as Sepoy Mutiny), around 260 sepoys were stationed at the Lalbagh Fort. On 22 November 1857, fearing disarmament orders by the British officers, a skirmish broke out. Around 40 sepoys were killed, some arrested and some fled to the jungles towards Mymensingh. By 30 November, 11 sepoys were hanged publicly as a punishment by a hurriedly constituted Court Martial trial. The spot is converted to Victoria Park later and it was renamed to Bahadur Shah Park in 1958. Following the unsuccessful rebellion, British East India Company's ruling ended and the British Crown took direct control of the region in 1858.

Dacca Municipality was established on 1 August 1864. At that time the area of Dhaka was 20.72 square kilometres with a population of around 52,000. Buckland Bund was constructed under a scheme by the then City Commissioner Charles Thomas Buckland in 1864 to protect Dhaka from flooding and river erosion.

In 1846, the first European-style modern bank, The Dacca Bank, was established in Dhaka. John Dunbar, the Commissioner of Dhaka, T A Wise, the Civil Surgeon of Dhaka and Khwaja Abdul Ghani, Nawab of Dhaka, were the trustees of the bank. In February 1862, Bank of Bengal bought out the Dacca Bank and made it one of its branches. The Dhaka branch then served as the government treasurer for the whole of East Bengal, receiving revenues from the district treasuries, supplying them with money and transferring government revenues to Calcutta.

In 1860, the first printing press Bangala Jantra was set up in Dhaka and also Dhaka's first periodical Kabita Kusumabali was founded in the same year. Dhaka's first theatre group, Purbabanga Rangabhumi, was established in the 1870s. Dhaka Prakash, the first Bengali language newspaper in Dhaka, was published on 7 March 1861.

On 9 September 1866, George Cotton, the Bishop of Calcutta, visited Dhaka.

Two earthquakes on 10 April and 11 May in 1872 caused damages to several houses and public buildings in Dhaka and nearby Tejgaon.

In 1885, the railway line between Dhaka and Narayanganj was built. Mymensingh was connected to Dhaka in 1889. Private cars were owned from the 1910s and the taxis and rickshaws were introduced in the 1930s.

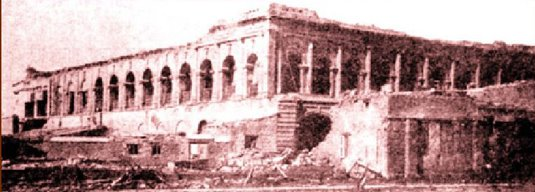
Ahsan Manzil damaged by tornado on 7 April 1888

The earliest records of Dhaka being hit by tornados were on 7 April 1888 and 12 April 1902 which killed 118 and 88 respectively. The property damage of the city was estimated at 70,000 pound sterling.

On 16 March 1892, a professional balloonist, Jeanette Rummary (who performed parachute jumps from smoke balloons with Park Van Tassel using the stage name Jeannette Van Tassel) was invited by Nawab Ahsanullah. A newspaper had reported that thousands of locals gathered around the palace on the occasion. After a successful balloon launch she jumped to descend by parachute but landed instead in a large tree at Ramna Garden in Shahbagh. Her rescue from the tree went awry and she fell from the tree and sustained severe injuries which she died from two days later. As the first aviator in Dhaka, she was buried in Narinda Christian graveyard.

3-day Bengal Provincial Conference was held in Dhaka during 30 May – 1 June in 1898. Chairperson Kali Charan Banerjee and writer Rabindranath Tagore made speeches during the event.

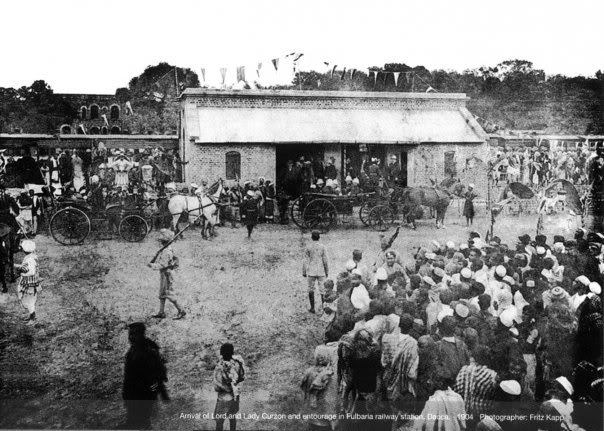
Lord and Lady Curzon arrived in Fulbaria Railway Station in February 1904

The then Viceroy of India Lord Curzon visited Dhaka on 18–19 February 1904, hosted by the Nawab family. He laid the foundation stone of Curzon Hall. In July 1905, he decided to take effect the Partition of Bengal and Dhaka became the capital of the new province, Eastern Bengal and Assam, on 16 October. Joseph Bampfylde Fuller entered on his office in Dhaka as the first Lieutenant-Governor of the region. The partition was revoked in 1911 and Dhaka became a district town on 1 April 1912.

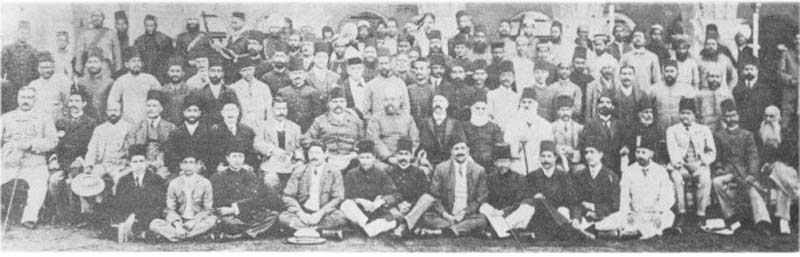
The AIME Conference in December 1906, held at the Nawab palace.

The 20th session of All India Muhammadan Educational Conference was held at Ishrat Manzil, in present-day Shahbag area in Dhaka during 27—30 December 1906. On the final day, the All-India Muslim League political party was formed, with the aim of the establishment of a separate Muslim-majority nation-state.

Eden College was founded in 1880. Narendra Narayan Roy Choudhury, landlord of the Baldah Estate, built Baldha Garden in 1909. University of Dhaka was established in 1921. Philip Hartog became the first vice-chancellor of the university. Ahsanullah School of Engineering (now Bangladesh University of Engineering and Technology) was established in 1912 under a substantial grant and patronage from Dhaka Nawab Family.

During World War II, United States Air Force had the 198th Station Hospital of 450 bed which served two air bases - in Tejgaon and Kurmitola. The hospitals were active during 1944–1946.

== East Bengal's (later East Pakistan's) capital (1947–1971) ==
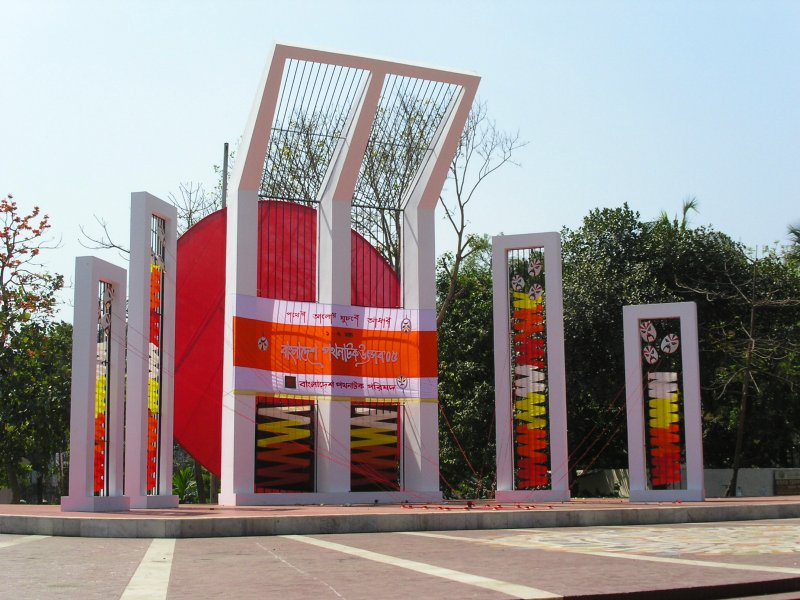
The Shaheed Minar commemorates the Language Movement of 1952 in Dhaka

Following the Partition of India in August 1947, Dhaka became the capital of East Bengal under the Dominion of Pakistan. The city witnessed serious communal violence that left thousands of people dead. A large proportion of the city's Hindu population departed for India, while the city received hundreds of thousands of Muslim immigrants from the Indian states of West Bengal, Assam and Bihar. Population increased from 335,925 in 1951 to 556,712 in 1961 registering an increase of 65.7 percent. As the centre of regional politics, Dhaka saw an increasing number of political strikes and incidents of violence. The proposal to adopt Urdu as the sole official language of Pakistan led to protest marches and strikes involving hundreds of thousands of people in Bengali language movement. The protests soon degenerated into widespread violence after police firing killed students who were demonstrating peacefully. Martial law was imposed throughout the city for a long period of time.

During the 1964 East Pakistan riots, at least 1000 persons were killed in communal riots against Bengali Hindus in Dhaka. The incident was instigated by an alleged theft of what was believed to be Muhammad's hair from the Hazratbal shrine in Jammu and Kashmir in India.

The arrest of the Bengali politician Sheikh Mujibur Rahman in 1968 would also spark intensive political protests and violence against the military regime of Ayub Khan. The 1970 Bhola cyclone devastated much of the region, killing numerous people. More than half the city of Dhaka was flooded and waterlogged, with millions of people marooned. The same year, Rahman won a landslide victory in general election. He was elected as the next president of Pakistan. However, both the West Pakistan's military rulers and the largest opposition party, Pakistan Peoples Party leader Zulfikar Ali Bhutto refused to hand over the presidency to East Pakistan leadership. On 7 March 1971, Rahman held a massive nationalist gathering at the Race Course Ground that attracted an estimated one million people. Galvanising public anger against ethnic and regional discrimination and poor cyclone relief efforts from the central government, the gathering preceded near total consensus among East Pakistan population for independent movement. In response, on 25 March 1971 in the middle of the night, the Pakistan Army launched Operation Searchlight, which led to the arrests, torture and killing of hundreds of thousands of people – just in that night alone. As a result, on behalf of Rahman, a Bengali army Major named Ziaur Rahman (later General and President) declared Bangladesh's independence on 26 March 1971. This resulted in further mass genocide of approximately 3 million people. Citizens and intellectuals from Dhaka were the largest victim of this mass genocide. The fall of the city to the Indian Army on 16 December 1971 marked the creation of the independent state of Bangladesh. Dhaka became the capital of Bangladesh.

Several notable architectural development took place in Dhaka during this period. Holy Family Hospital was built in March 1953. New Market was established in Azimpur in 1954. Dhaka College was moved to Dhanmondi in July 1956. Kamalapur railway station was established in 1969. "East Pakistan Polytechnic Institute, Dacca" (now Dhaka Government Polytechnic Institute) was established in May 1955 by Oklahoma State University-Stillwater with funding from the Ford Foundation. East Regional Laboratories (later Bangladesh Council of Scientific and Industrial Research; colloquially known as Science Laboratory) set up different laboratories and buildings in Dhanmondi campus near New Market in 1960.

The Second Asian Highway Motor Rally began in Tehran, Iran on the 7 November 1970, and ended in Dhaka on 15 November, passing through Afghanistan, West Pakistan, India, and Nepal. It was sponsored by United Nations Economic Commission for Asia and the Far East (ECAFE) to promote trade and tourism by publicizing improved road networks across continent.

Pope Paul VI visited Dhaka on 26 November 1970; also Pope John Paul II in November 1986 and Pope Francis in November 2017.

== Post-independence of Bangladesh (1971–present) ==
Historical population
Year	Pop.
1801	200,000
1840	51,636
1872	69,212
1881	79,076
1911	125,000
1941	239,000
1951	336,000
1961	556,000
1974	1,680,000
1981	3,440,000
1991	6,150,000
2013	14,399,000

Despite independence, political turmoil continued to plague the people of Dhaka. The Pakistan Army's operations had killed or displaced millions of people, and the new state struggled to cope with the humanitarian challenges. The year 1975 saw the killing of Sheikh Mujib and three military coups. The city would see the restoration of order under military rule, but political disorder would heighten in the mid-1980s with the pro-democracy movement led by the Awami League and the Bangladesh Nationalist Party. Political and student strikes and protests routinely disrupted the lives of Dhaka's people. However, the post-independence period has also seen a massive growth of the population, attracting migrant workers from rural areas across Bangladesh. A real estate boom has followed the development of new settlements such as Gulshan, Banani and Motijheel. Dhaka hosted the inaugural summit of the South Asian Association for Regional Cooperation (1985), the D8 group summit (1999) and three South Asian Games events (1985, 1993 and 2010).

In 1982, the English spelling of the city was officially changed from Dacca to Dhaka.

In 1983, City Corporation was created to govern Dhaka and its population reached 3,440,147 and it covered an area of 400 square kilometres. The city was divided into 75 wards. Under a new act in 1993, the first election was held in 1994 and Mohammad Hanif became the first elected Mayor of Dhaka. In 2011, Dhaka City Corporation was split into two separate corporations – DCC North and DCC South and in 2015 election Annisul Huq and Sayeed Khokon were elected as the mayors of the respective corporations. In July 2017, 36 new wards were added to the two city corporations.

Dhaka Metro Rail started operations in December 2022.

== See also ==
- Timeline of Dhaka
- History of Chittagong
- History of Rangpur

== Bibliography ==
- Sengupta, Nitish K. (2011). Land of Two Rivers: A History of Bengal from the Mahabharata to Mujib. Penguin Books India. pp. 39–49. ISBN 978-0-14-341678-4.
