= Kashmiri Khwaja =

Khawaja or Koshur khwaja is an honorific title used as surname by many Kashmiri Muslims. The word comes from the Iranian word khwāja (New Persian khāje خواجه) and translates as "master", "lord".

Some of the Kashmiri converts to Islam by Sufi saints also adopted the title Khawaja. Khawajas were considered rich and were mostly traders.

== Notable people ==
- Khwaja Hafizullah, Land Lord of Dhaka
- Khwaja Alimullah, Founder of Dhaka Nawab Family
- Khwaja Abdul Ghani, First Nawab of Dhaka
- Nawab of Dhaka
- Khawaja Nazimuddin, Second Governor General and Prime Minister of Pakistan
- Khwaja Ahsanullah, Nawab of Dhaka
- Khwaja Salimullah, Nawab of Dhaka and founder of Muslim League in 1906
- Khwaja Muhammad Azam Didamari
- Hina Khawaja Bayat
- Khawaja Shahabuddin, ex Governor of NWFP now KPK
- Khwaja Habibullah, last Nawab of Dhaka
- Khawaja Muhammad Asif
- Usman Khawaja
- Khawaja Saad Rafique
- Khawaja abdul rasheed
- Khawaja Mansoor Ahmed
- Khawaja Muhammad Sabeeh
- Khawaja Muhammad Uns
- Khwaja Sabir, Viceroy of Deccan during Mughal rule in India
