= Khwaja Hafizullah =

Zamindar of Dhaka from 1780 to 1815

- Zamindar of Dacca
- Reign: 1780–1815
- Predecessor: Moulvi Khwaja Abdullah
- Successor: Khwaja Alimullah
- Born: 1735; Rawalakot, Durrani Empire
- Died: 1815 (aged 79–80); Dacca, Bengal Presidency
- Burial: Begum Bazar, Dhaka, Bangladesh
- House: Dhaka Nawab Family
- Father: Moulvi Khwaja Abdullah

Khwaja Hafizullah Kashmiri (1735–1815), also known as Moulvi Hafizullah, was an 18th-century merchant of Kashmiri origin. He and his nephew, Khwaja Alimullah, were the founding members of the Nawab of Dhaka

He was the youngest of six children. His father was Moulvi Khwaja Abdullah (d. 1796), while his mother was the daughter of Khwaja Abdul Salam. His paternal grandparents were Khwaja Abdul Kader Kashmiri and Asuri Khanam. The father of Asuri Khanam was Khwaja Abdul Hakim Kashmiri.

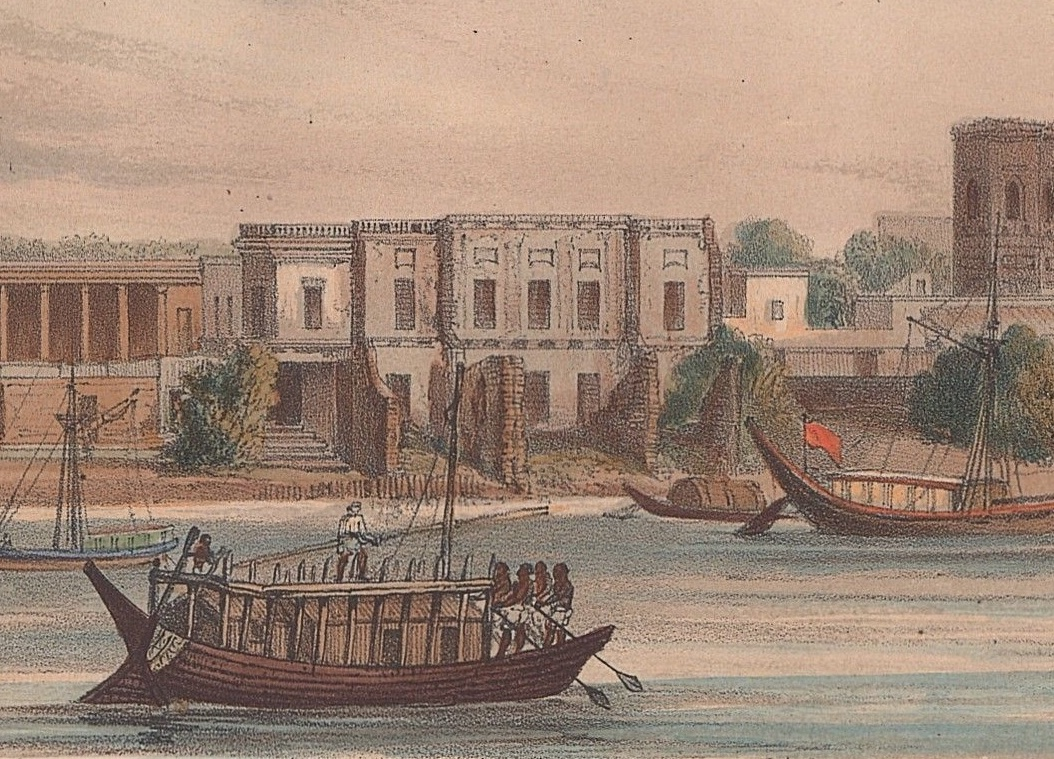
House of Hafizullah on the bank of Buriganga River (1847 lithograph)

Hafizullah collaborated with the Greek and Armenian merchants in Dhaka and developed a business in hides, skins, salt and spices. Under the act of the Permanent Settlement of Bengal, he bought some lots for the estate. In 1806, he acquired his first lot in the Atia pargana in the then Mymensingh district for a 4-anna share of a mortgage bond for Rs. 40,000. In 1812, he bought Aila Phuljhuri in the Sundarbans of about 44,000 acres for Rs. 21,000 at a revenue demand of Rs. 372 per year.

== Death and legacy ==
Hafizullah had three wives including Dhan Bibi. On his death, his estate was inherited by his nephew Khwaja Alimullah, a son of his elder brother Ahsanullah.

He had many children, most notable being Khwaja Abdul Ghafur (1782–1822) with Dhan Bibi.
