= Ahsan Manzil =

National museum in Bangladesh

- আহসান মঞ্জিল
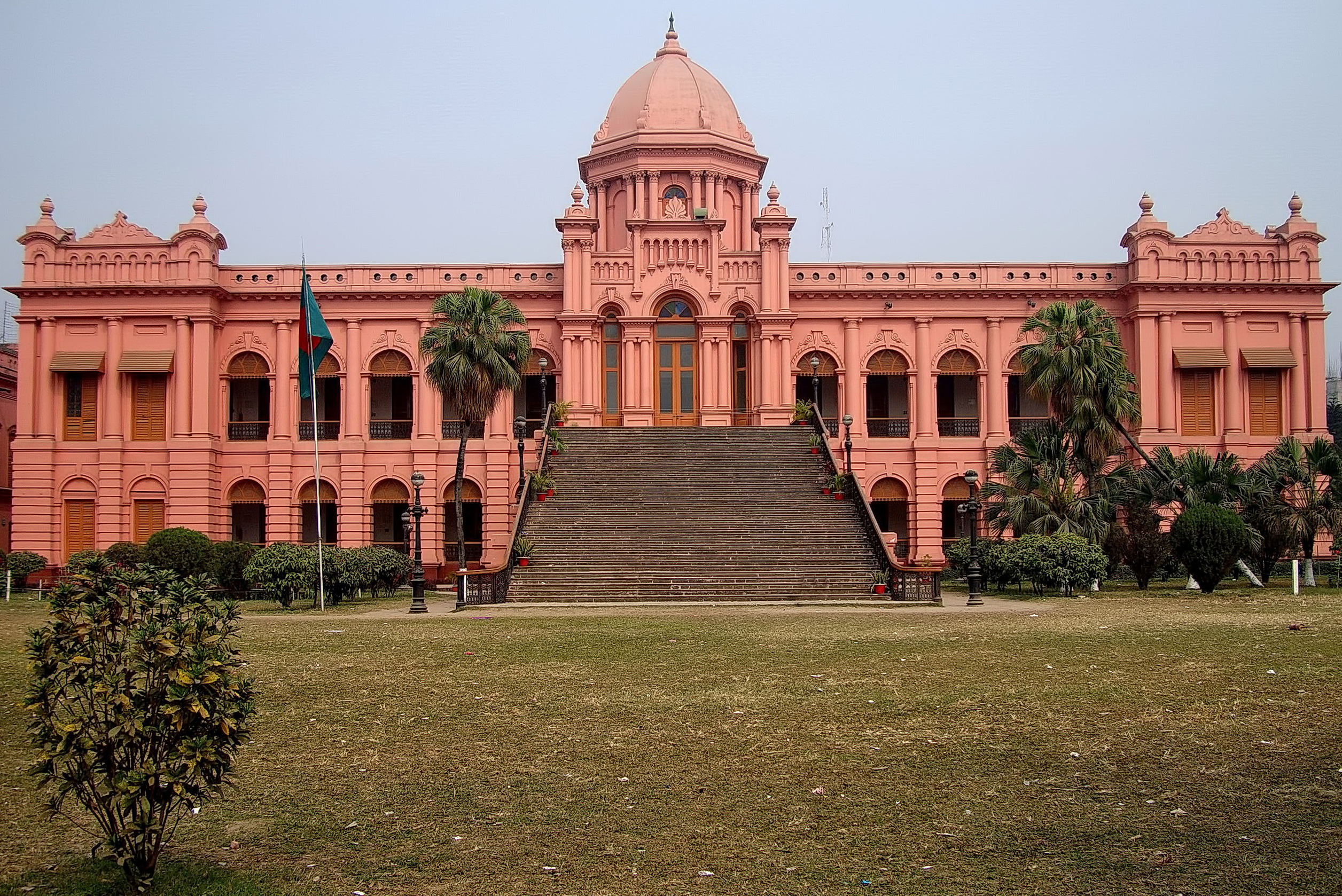
- Former names: Rangmahal

General information
- Architectural style: Indo-Saracenic Revival architecture
- Location: Kumartoli, Dhaka, Bangladesh
- Coordinates: 23°42′30.95″N 90°24′21.81″E
- Construction started: 1859
- Completed: 1872
- Owner: Bangladesh National Museum

Design and construction
- Main contractor: Martin and Co.

Website
- Ahsan Manzil Museum
- List of Old Dhaka Heritage Sites

Ahsan Manzil (Bengali: আহসান মঞ্জিল, romanized: Ahsān Mônjil) is a historic palace situated in Kumartoli along the banks of Buriganga River in Dhaka, Bangladesh. It served as the official residence and administrative seat of the Nawab of Dhaka during the late 19th and early 20th centuries.

Constructed in the Indo-Saracenic architectural style, the palace has been designated an Old Dhaka Heritage Site. It is currently preserved and operated as a museum under the Bangladesh National Museum, exhibiting artefacts and historical materials related to the Nawab family and the socio-political history of Dhaka.

== History ==
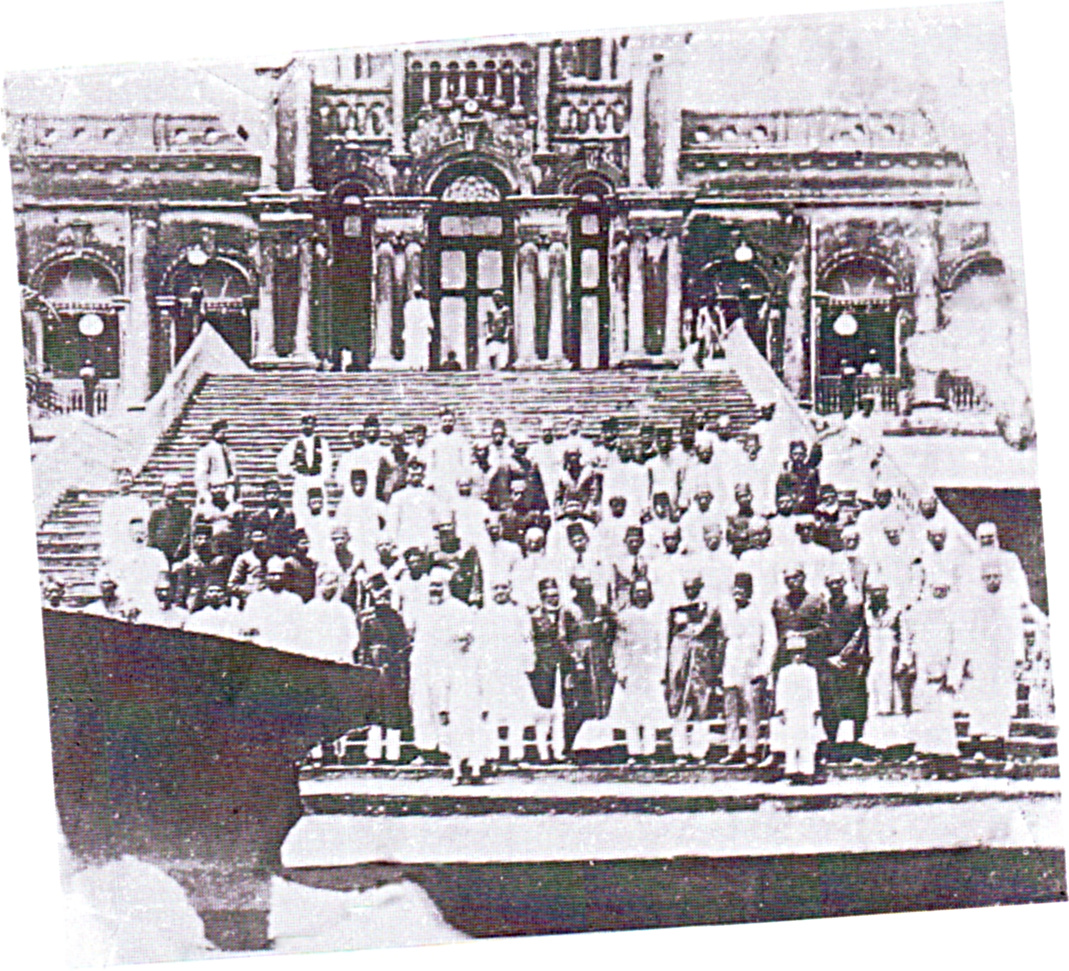
Khwaja Salimullah with his family in front of Ahsan Manzil

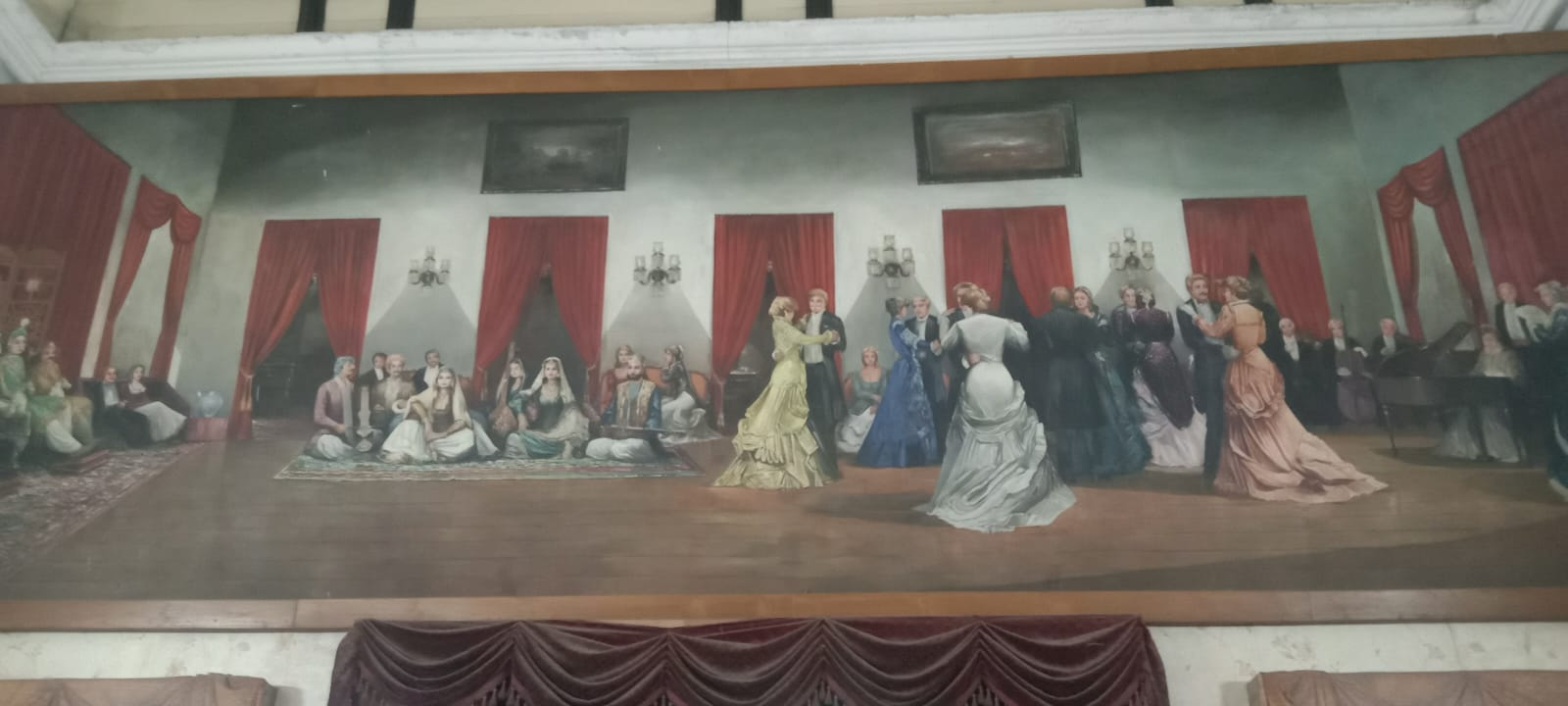
Ballroom dancing with Indian classical music at an event hosted by Nawab Sir Khwaja Abdul Ghani (seated far left) on the first floor of Ahsan Manzil

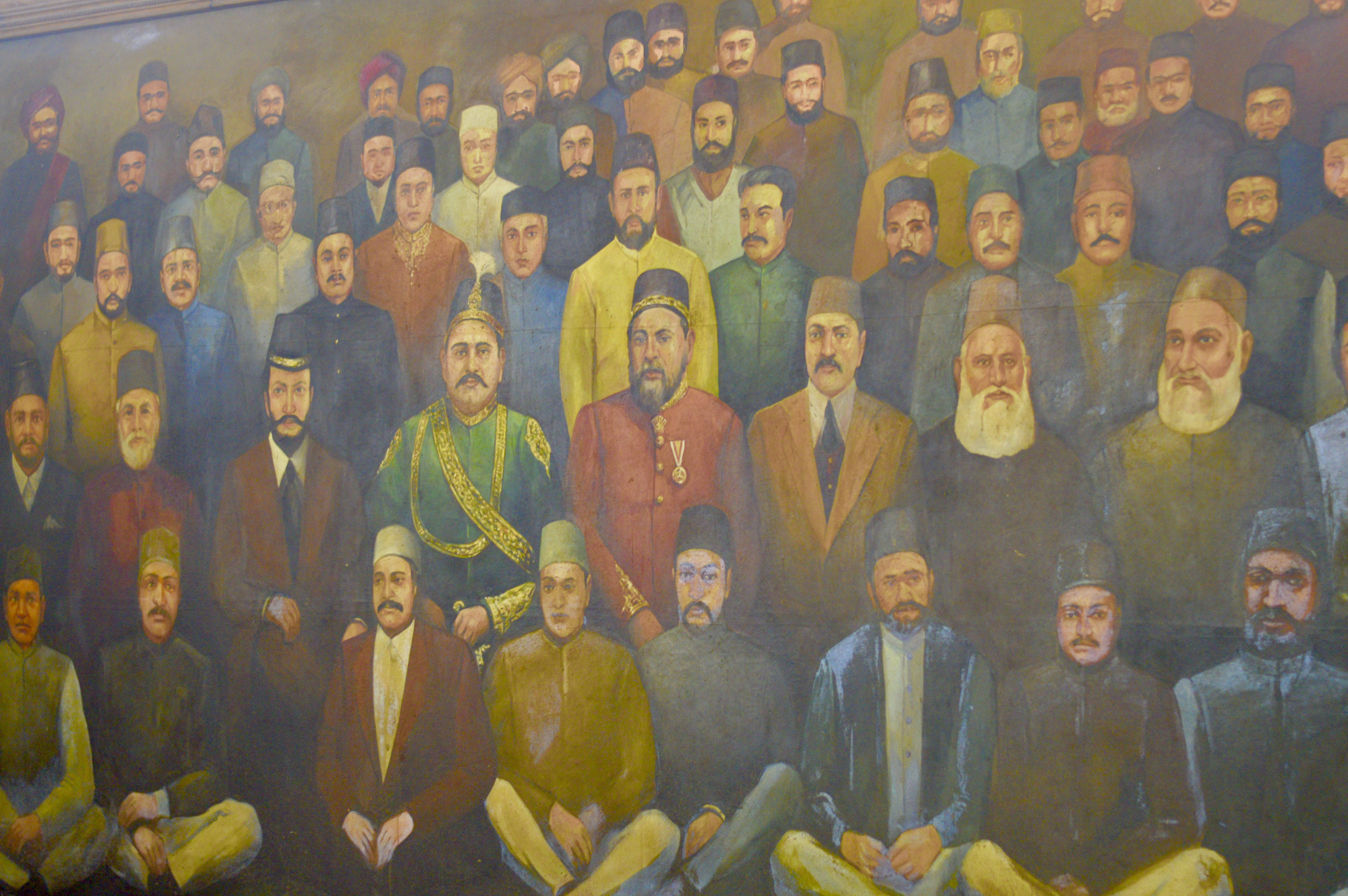
Painting of the 1st session of the All India Muslim League at Ahsan Manzil in 1906. The League was founded at the palace under the patronage of Nawab Sir Khwaja Salimullah

During the Mughal era, Sheikh Enayetullah, the then Zamindar of the Jalalpur Pargana (Faridpur-Barisal), had a garden house on this property and later added a palace, which he called Rang Mahal. He was buried on the northeast corner of the palace yard (the gravesite was ruined in early 1900s). Around 1740, his son, Sheikh Matiullah, sold the property to French traders, who erected a trading house beside the property. On 22 June 1757, the French left the trading house and in 1785, transferred the property to a French tradesman named Champigni, and retaken it at 1801. After the 1814 Treaty of Paris, they claimed all their left properties at Dhaka, and in 1827 the property was again returned to the French. Eventually, they decided to sell all their properties in Dhaka. In 1830, Khwaja Alimullah purchased the property from them. Alimullah renovated the property, turning the trading house into a residence and adding a stable and a family mosque. After his death, his son Khwaja Abdul Ghani named the property Ahsan Manzil after his son, Khwaja Ahsanullah. He hired Martin and Company, a European construction and engineering firm, to make a master plan for their residence. The palace was constructed during 1859–1872. The old building was renamed Andar Mahal and the new building, Rangmahal.

On 7 April 1888, a tornado severely damaged Ahsan Manzil and it was temporarily abandoned. With the exception of Rangmahal, which only required repairs, all buildings had to be rebuilt. Abdul Ghani and Ahsanullah continued renovations. What was previously the French trading house was rebuilt as a two-storey building similar to the Rangmahal. A wooden bridge connected the first floors of the two buildings. The palace was repaired again following the 1897 Assam earthquake. It became a slum for a period after the government acquired it in 1952 under the East Bengal Estate Acquisition Act.

The Government of Bangladesh acquired the palace and property in 1985 and began renovating it, taking care to preserve the remaining structure. Renovations were completed in 1992 and the ownership was transferred to the Bangladesh National Museum. Part of the northern side of the property was given to the Dhaka City Corporation while half of the Andarmahal and the Nawab residential area were beyond acquisition. Just under 5 acres (220,000 sq ft) was then used for the museum.

== Architecture ==
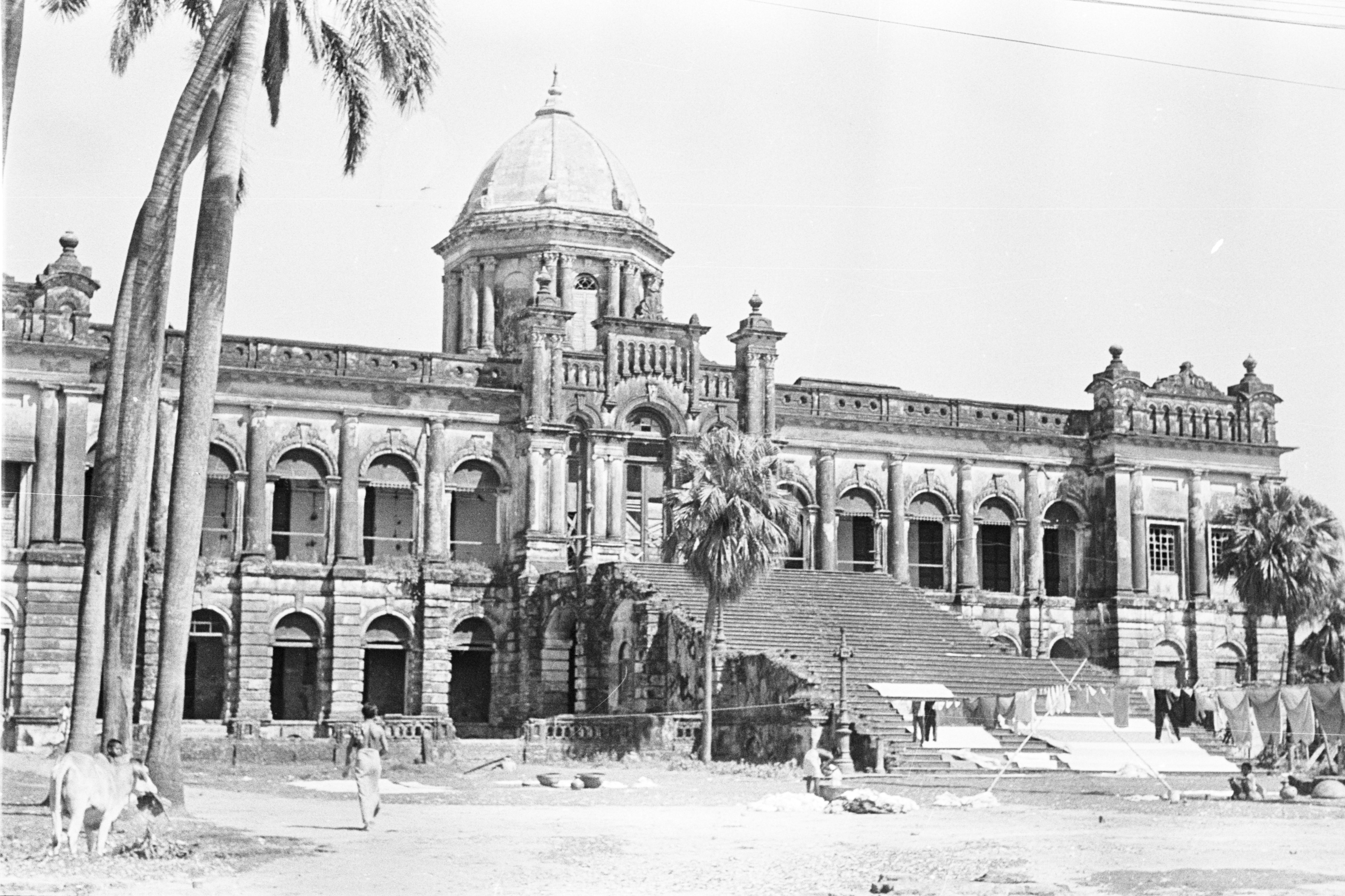
Ahsan Manzil in 1965

Ahsan Manzil was built on a 1 metre (3.3 ft) raised platform and the palace measured 125.4 metres (137.1 yd) by 28.75 metres (31.44 yd). There are 5 metres (16 ft) porticos on the northern and southern sides of the palace. The building itself faces the Buriganga River. On the riverside is a stairway leading up to the second portal. A fountain previously sat at the foot of the stairs but was not rebuilt. Along the north and south sides of the building are verandas with open terraces.

The palace is divided into the eastern side, the Rangmahal, and the western side, the Andarmahal. The Rangmahal features the dome, a drawing room, a card room, a library, a state room, and two guest rooms. The Andarmahal has a ballroom, a storeroom, an assembly room, a chest room, a dining hall, a music room, and a few residential rooms. Both the drawing room and the music room have artificial vaulted ceilings. The dining and assembly rooms have white, green, and yellow ceramic tiles.

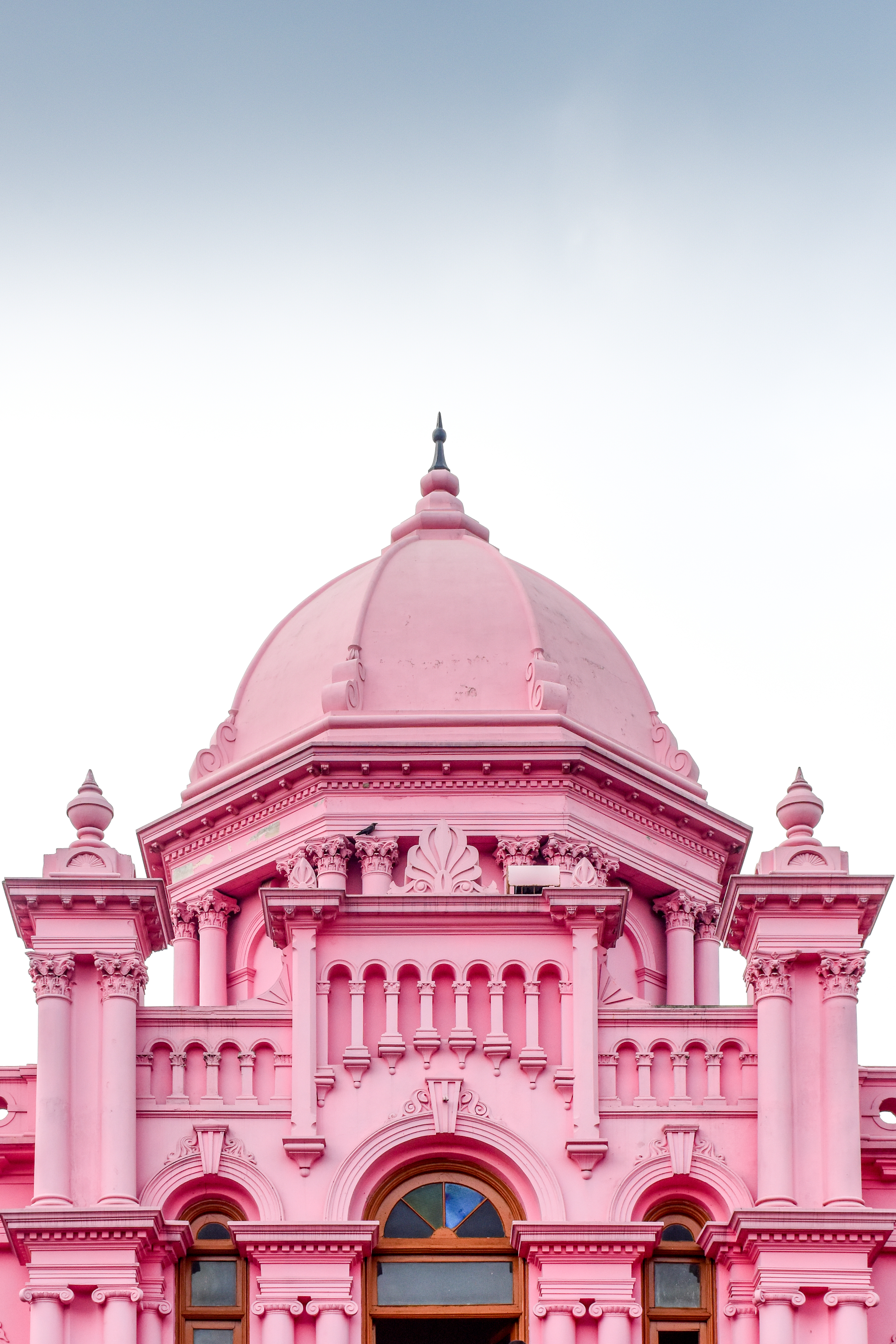
Dome of Ahsan Manzil

The dome is at the center of the palace and is complex in its design. The room at its base is square with brickwork placed around the corners to make it circular. Squinches were added to the roof corners to give the room an octagonal shape and slant gradually to give the dome the appearance of a lotus bud. The dome's peak is 27.13 metres (89.0 ft) tall.

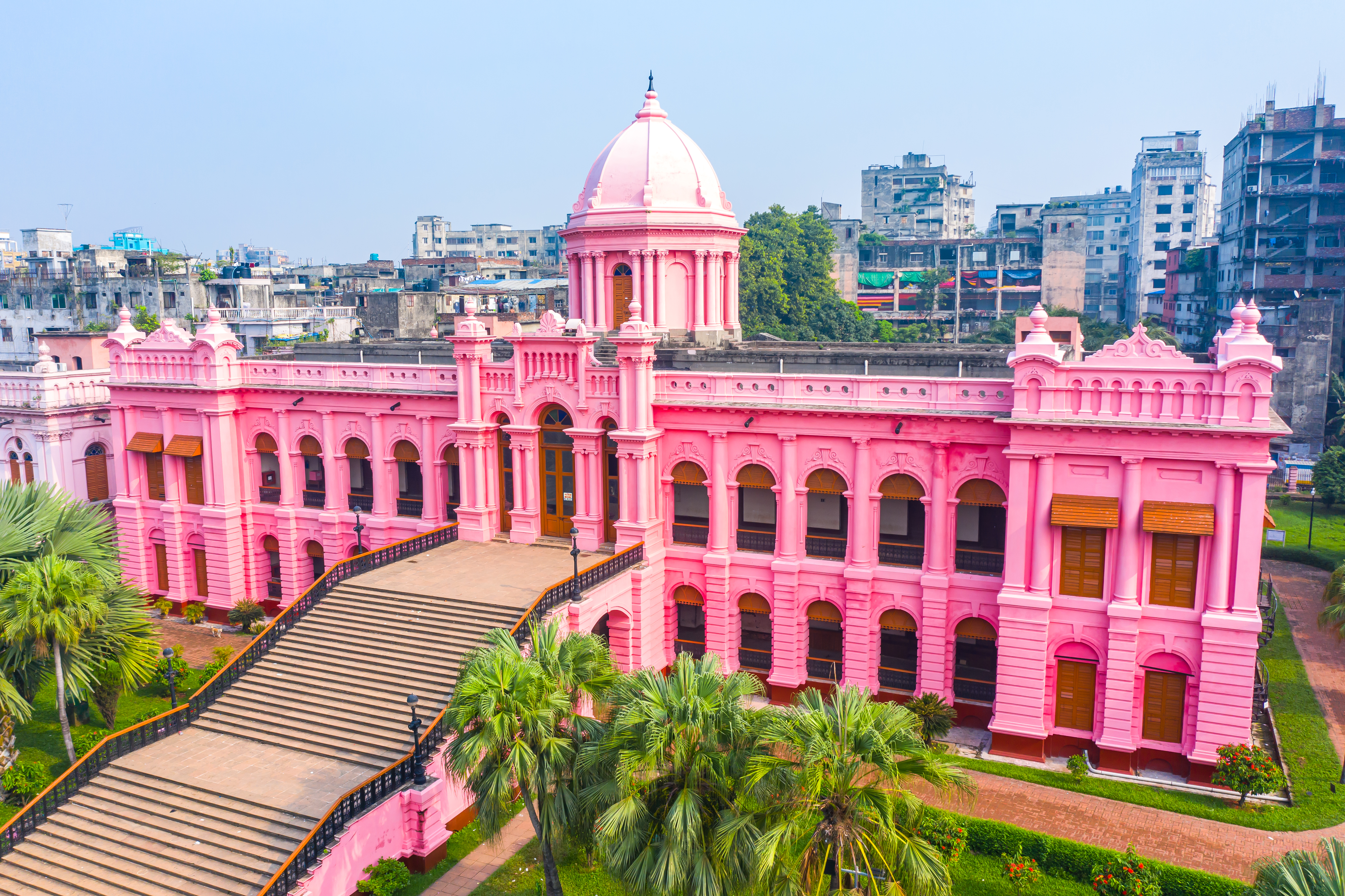
Ahsan Manzil extended view

== Political use ==
High-profile visitors to the area, including Lord Dufferin, often boarded at the palace. The All India Muslim League emerged from this property. This is the former official seat of the Nawab of Dhaka.
