= Bahadur Shah Park =

Memorial park in Dhaka

- বাহাদুর শাহ পার্ক
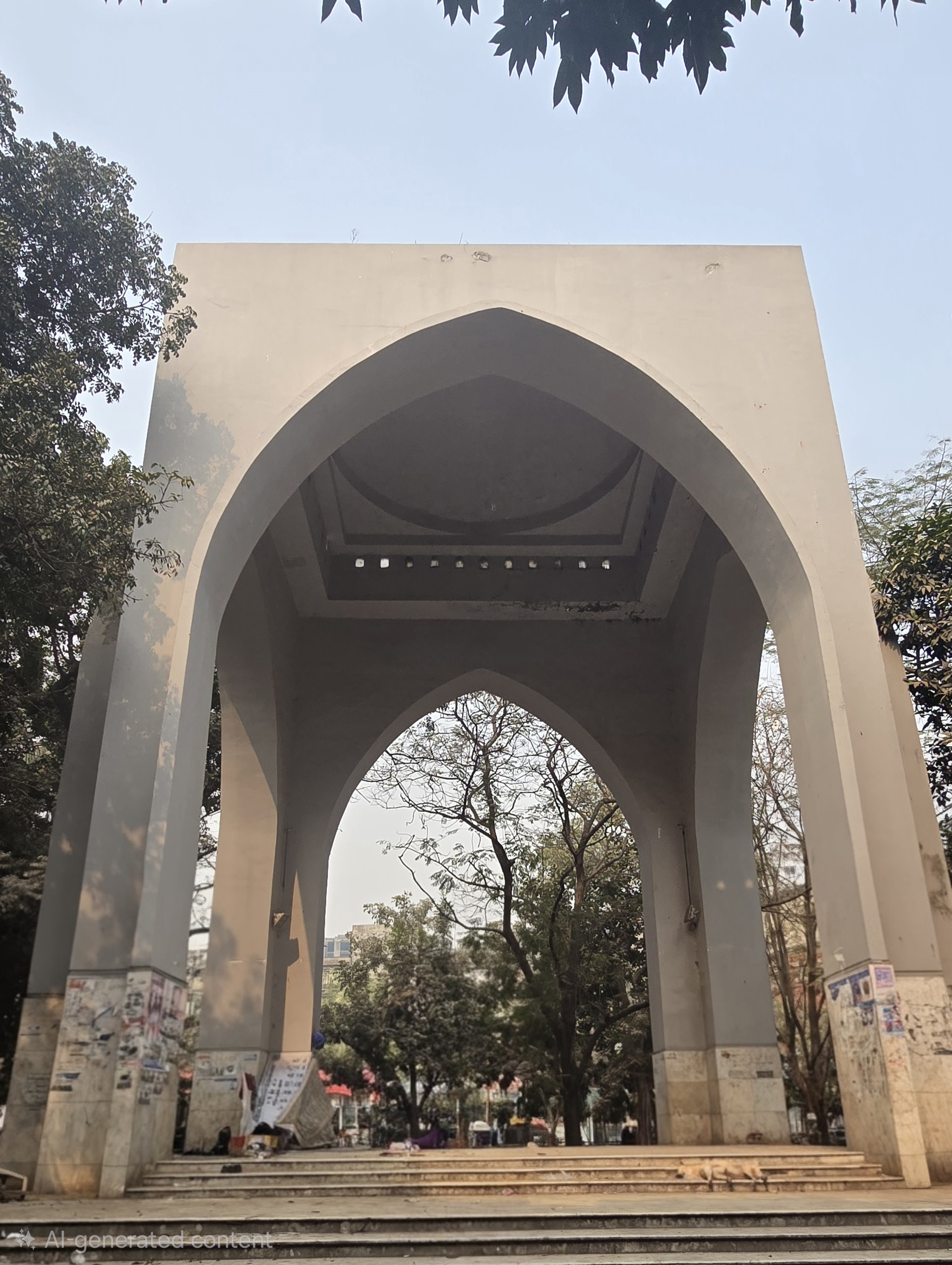
- Bahadur Shah Park in 2026
- Interactive map of Bahadur Shah Park
- Type: Urban park
- Location: Old Dhaka, Bangladesh
- Coordinates: 23.709204897163737°N 90.41230093345173°E
- Created: 1800s
- Visitors: 400–500 (in 2018)
- Status: Open all year
- List of Old Dhaka Heritage Sites

Bahadur Shah Park (Bengali: বাহাদুর শাহ পার্ক), formerly Victoria Park, is a historically significant urban park located in Old Dhaka, Bangladesh. Developed in the 19th century, it commemorates the soldiers who died during the Indian Rebellion of 1857 against British colonial rule. Named after the last Mughal emperor, Bahadur Shah II, the park features several monuments and serves as a historical landmark and a popular recreational area for locals.

== Description ==
The historical Bahadur Shah Park is located in Laxmibazar, Old Dhaka, under ward 42 of Dhaka South City Corporation. It features two entrances and two main memorials: the tallest one on the eastern side commemorates the martyred sepoys, and the other is the Khwaja Hafizullah obelisk. There is also a smaller obelisk signifying Queen Victoria's throne and a star-shaped octagonal fountain in the centre of the park. The park is enclosed by an iron railing.

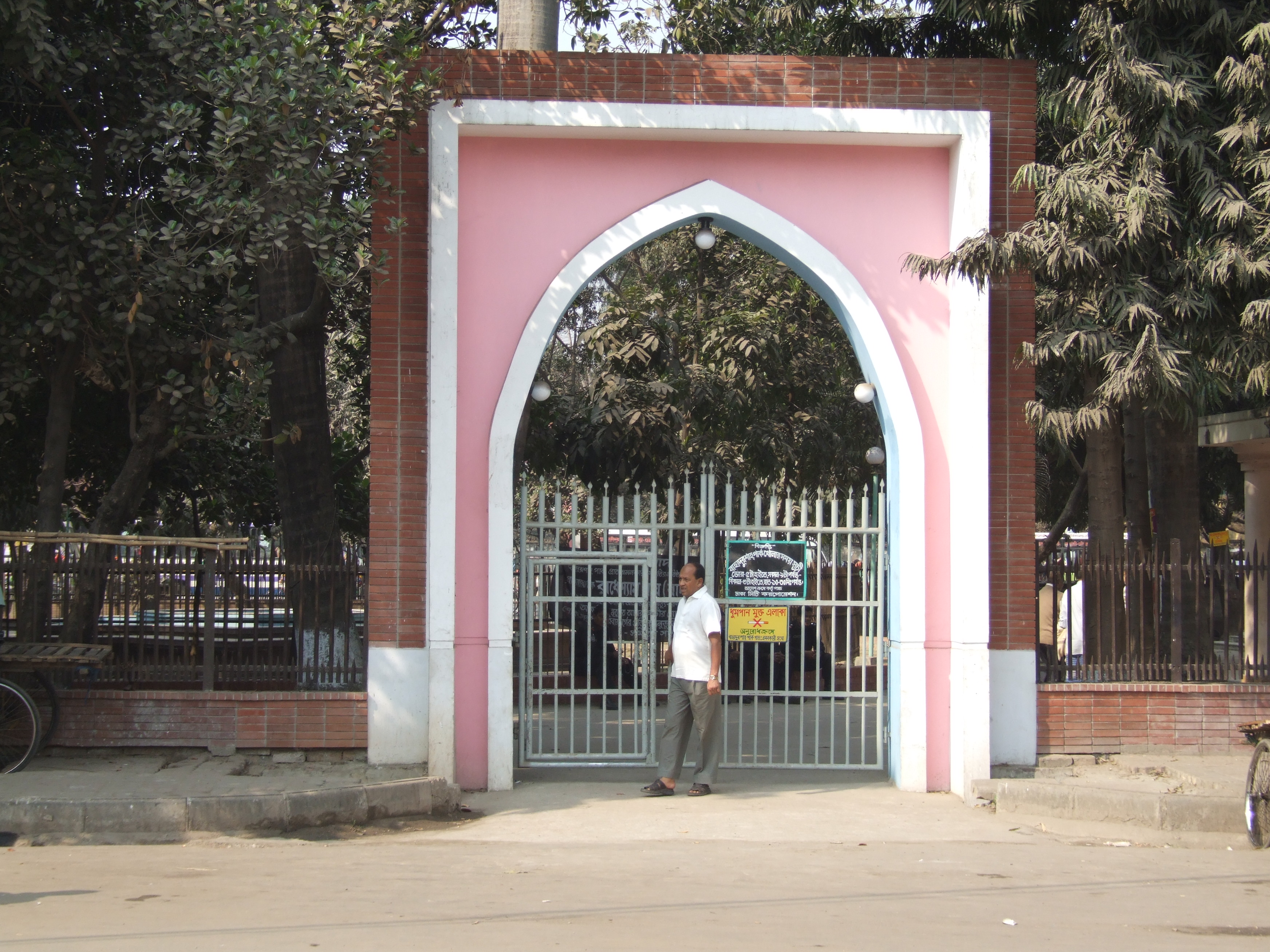
Main entrance to the park

Situated in a populous and busy area of the old town, it is surrounded by important institutions such as Dhaka Judges Court, various banks, Jagannath University, and Kabi Nazrul College. The park has become a social gathering spot, with separate seating arrangements for women.

=== Visitors ===
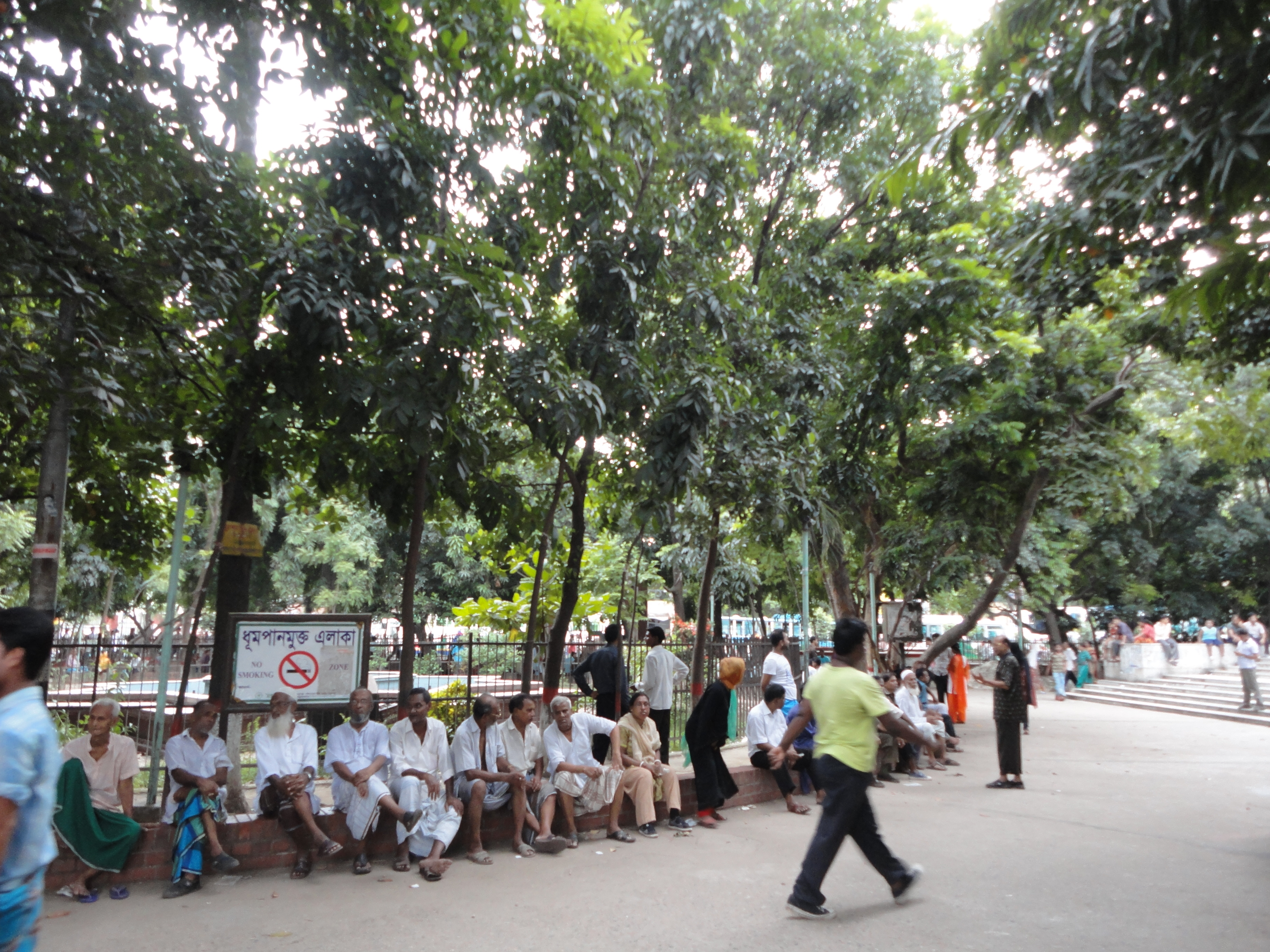
Bahadur Shah Park promenade.

In 2018, Bahadur Shah Park saw daily visitor numbers ranging from 400 to 500, primarily consisting of students and local residents who visited for jogging and socialising. Male visitors were comparatively more numerous than female visitors.

== History ==
=== Late 18th and early 19th centuries: Antaghar Maidan ===
Near the end of the eighteenth century, Armenians established Dhaka's first European-style club at the site of the present Bahadur Shah Park, officially named the Armenian Club. They engaged in various games such as billiards, leading the club to be popularly known as 'Antaghar'. The adjoining ground was called 'Antaghar Maidan' by the locals. Antaghar served as both an entertainment hub and a vital meeting place for Europeans in Dhaka, attracting up to 150 people on Sundays, while natives were barred from entry.

Possibly near the start of the 19th century, the English acquired the since dilapidated Antaghar and subsequently demolished it. The Nawab of Dhaka, Khwaja Abdul Ghani, personally contributed to the development of Antaghar Maidan on its ruins. James Taylor noted in his 1840 book, A Sketch of the Topography & Statistics of Dacca, that there was a small open space with a circular garden at the junction of two streets. Shortly after Antaghar's closure, the European Club was established in its place under English leadership. This club also restricted access to foreigners only, angering Dhaka's local elites, who protested by storming the club. In response, Europeans eased the restrictions somewhat, permitting local elites to enter under conditions such as adhering to a dress code.

=== Late 19th century: Victoria Park ===
Antaghar Maidan gained a notorious reputation during the Sepoy Mutiny of 1857 when several soldiers (sepoys) were hanged from trees there, causing widespread unease. In 1858, the commissioner of Dhaka Division notably announced Queen Victoria's direct rule of the subcontinent and declaration of clemency for the sepoy uprising to a large assembly at this location, subsequently transforming its name from Antaghar Maidan into Victoria Park. When Abdul Ghani's grandson, Khwaja Hafizullah, died, his English friends helped raise funds to build an obelisk in his memory here in 1884 or 1885, according to varying sources. The European Club remained here until 1888, when it relocated to larger premises further south and was renamed the Dhaka Club.

According to architect Mahbubur Rahman, Bahadur Shah Park had the characteristics of a European city centre, with major colonial civic establishments around an oval-shaped island situated at the intersection of two main city roads: the oldest pre-Mughal east–west road and the first major colonial axis road connecting Sadarghat with the expanding northern city. By the late 19th century, the area featured a mosque, church, school, college, madrasa, bank, news office, library, hostel, and other institutions.

=== 20th century to present: Bahadur Shah Park ===
In 1957, the Dhaka Improvement Trust built a cenotaph here in memory of the mutineers, and the park was renamed Bahadur Shah Park in honour of the last Mughal emperor, during whose reign the mutiny had occurred a century earlier. The Dhaka City Corporation renovated the park in the 1960s.

In March 2020, Dhaka South City Corporation began an overhaul of the park as part of a development project. Contractors were tasked with repairing damaged structures and adding new features, including a 740-metre oval walkway, public toilets, benches, greenery, gardens, and an amphitheatre gallery, equipping the area with bright lights. The Sepoy Mutiny memorial also received a facelift. Additionally, a four-foot-deep drain was constructed to manage rainwater, with pebbles covering the floors. The project, costing approximately ৳55 million (US$450,000), revitalised nearly 1.4054 acres (5,687 m^{2}) of the park. However, the granite monument commemorating Khwaja Hafizullah remains unrepaired.

== Issues ==
A year after the 2020 renovation, Bahadur Shah Park faced several issues, including the presence of homeless individuals and vendors, as well as drug use and scattered garbage. Authorities cited a lack of adequate manpower, such as guards and dedicated cleaners, as a significant problem. Additionally, old structures like the obelisk appeared to have not been cleaned for a long time.
