= Joaquim Joseph A. Campos =

Indian historian

Joachim Joseph A. Campos (1893 – 13 May 1945), also known as J.J.A. Campos, was a writer, editor, and took an active interest in history. He is known for his book History of the Portuguese in Bengal, which according to the historian Dr. Teotonio R. De Souza remains "still a classic".

== Description of the author ==
In his 1919-published magnum opus, Campos is described as the joint editor of The Century Review, member of the Asiatic Society of Calcutta, "etc, etc". Campos traced his roots to the Portuguese colony of Goa, so while technically he was Portuguese during that era, he was also of South Asian or Indian (Goan) ethnicity.

== Critical response ==
Reviewing his most-ambitious work in 1919, The Spectator wrote:

Mr. Campos reminds us in his interesting book that Portuguese had become a lingua franca for Eastern ports, and that Clive " knew no Indian language but could speak Portuguese fluently and com- manded his native troops in the Portuguese language." There were Portuguese victims in the Black Hole. The adventurers intermarried with the natives. The missionaries converted many thousands of natives to the Roman Catholic faith and baptized them with Portuguese names. A considerable number of the descendants of the mixed marriages (Luso-Indians) and of the natives (Feringhis) Christianized by the Portuguese are still to be found in Bengal. Mr. Campos has taken great pains with his narrative, which describes in detail a notable episode in the history of European relations with India.

== Personal life ==
According to a general notice issued by the Supreme Court of Kenya's probate and administration section (cause no. 114 of 1947), Joaquim Joseph Campos of Kenya died in Bangkok, Thailand on 13 May 1945, and his widow was Matilde Campos.
