= Khwaja Abdul Ghani =

Second Nawab of Dhaka

Nawab Khwaja Abdul Ghani
- Nawab of Dhaka; KCSI
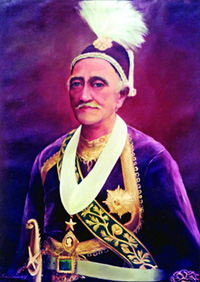
- Reign: 1854–1896
- Predecessor: Khwaja Alimullah
- Successor: Khwaja Ahsanullah
- Born: 30 July 1813; Begum Bazaar, Bengal, British India
- Died: 24 August 1896 (aged 83); Ahsan Manzil, Bengal, British India
- Burial: Kartalab Khan Mosque; Dhaka, Bangladesh
- Spouse: Ismatun Nesa
- House: Dhaka Nawab Family
- Father: Khwaja Alimullah
- Mother: Zeenat Begum
- Religion: Sunni Islam

Nawab Bahadur Sir Khwaja Abdul Ghani KCSI (30 July 1813 – 24 August 1896) was the second Nawab of Dhaka and the first to assume the title of Nawab as hereditary, recognized by the British Raj.

He introduced the panchayat system, gaslights, water works, newspaper, and the zoological garden to Dhaka. He established Ahsan Manzil, the residence and seat of power for Dhaka Nawab Family, Victoria Park, the gardens at Dilkusha and Shahbag, where he initiated many annual events like Boli Khela and agricultural and industrial fair to celebrate the Christian New Year. He was also responsible for the Buckland Bund and the first female ward in the first hospital in Dhaka, and was a founding commissioner of Dhaka municipality.

== Background ==
Khwaja Abdul Ghani was the second son of Khwaja Alimullah, who consolidated the Khwaja family estate to become the first Nawab of the family. He was born into a wealthy and prominent Muslim family that traced its origins back to Persia. He inherited the estate from his father, which included the French kuthi at Kumartuli bought by Alimullah in 1830, the Shahbag garden bought by Alimullah from Griffith Cook, a British Justice in 1840. His mother was Zinat Begum. Alimullah had 8 other wives and 15 other children.

Abdul Ghani was a polyglot; he spoke Bengali, Urdu, English, Arabic, and Persian. He had learnt Arabic and Persian at home, and English at Dhaka Collegiate School, where he was the student of the very first batch. He is known as patron of Urdu and Persian literature in Dhaka. He observed the Shi'a Remembrance of Muharram, and contributed to renovate Hoseni Dalan, the Shi'ite centre in Dhaka, though he was a Sunni himself. He also had close relations with the Hindu, Armenian and European communities.

In 1846, Khwaja Abdul Ghani inherited all the family properties, landed or otherwise, as an indivisible concern by a waqfnama executed by his father Khwaja Alimullah. As the mutawalli (trustee) he was made the sole administrator of the estate, as well as the sole representative and spokesperson of the family. He had the sole responsibility to distribute the family income as individual allowances and to select a successor as he deemed fit.

Abdul Ghani had four wives – Ismatunnesa Khanam, Umda Khanam, Munni Bibi, and Dulhan Bibi. His successor, Khwaja Ahsanullah, was his second son born to his first wife Ismatunnesa (d. 1887). He had 10 other children and 21 known grandchildren. Among his non-succeeding grandchildren the most famous was poet Khwaja Muhammad Afzal, son of his daughter Nurjahan Khanam and Nawab Khwaja Yusuf Jan Khan Bahadur.

== Political views ==
Abdul Ghani was loyal to the British Raj. During the Sepoy Mutiny of 1857, he remained on their side and gave valuable information of the actual state of the country, and placed all his elephants, boats, horses, and carriages at their disposal. He said:

My presence in the station at this critical moment inspires my countrymen with hope and confidence in the British Government and prevents the evil-doers from carrying out their wicked designs. My absence, on the other hand, will cause a general panic and precipitate matters which we are so anxious to prevent.

Abdul Ghani served the Raj long as member of the Municipality and the Magistracy, and was known as a fine arbiter of conflicts. In 1869, he settled a violent Shi'ite-Sunni riot through arbitration.

Abdul Ghani struck a good relation with Lord Northbrook, Governor General of India (1872–1876) who was against the Disraeli government in England, and Lord Dufferin, Viceroy of India (1884–1888) who enacted the Bengal Tenancy Act 1885. The Raj eventually vested the title of Nawab, which was made hereditary and was upgraded to the title of Nawab Bahadur.

== Positions and titles ==
- 1864: Nominated Commissioner of the freshly erected Dhaka municipality
- 1866: Appointed Honorary Magistrate and a member of Bengal Legislative Council
- 1867: Appointed additional member of the Governor General's Legislative Council
- 1871: Decorated Companion of Star of India (CSI)
- 1875: Vested the title of Nawab
- 1876: Granted 7 Turuk Sawar (horse mounted guards)
- 1877: Title of Nawab made hereditary
- 1886: Decorated Knight Commander of Star of India (KCSI)
- 1892: Vested the title of Nawab Bahadur

== Contributions ==
Abdul Ghani developed the property he inherited and was put in charge of, taking it to height of the history of the family. He also contributed significantly to development of Dhaka. He introduced gaslights to light Dhaka streets, and running water facilities at his own expense. Nawab Ghani's water works cost about Rs 250,000. Its foundation stone was laid by Lord Northbrook on 6 August 1874. He also established a Langarkhana (asylum) in Dhaka in 1866 for the destitute, a high school at Kumartuli in 1863 (which later became Khwaja Salimullah College, named after his grandson), and the Abdul Ghani High School in Jamurki, Tangail.

=== Ahsan Manzil ===
Abdul Ghani engaged Martin & Company, a European construction and engineering firm, from 1859 to 1872 to develop the kuthi in Kumartuli and rebuilt it into one of Dhaka's finest landmarks. Renamed Ahsan Manzil after his son and successor Khwaja Ahsanullah, it became the seat of power for the family. In the newly built Rang Mahal (the older building was known as Andar Mahal) he received Lord Northbrook and Lord Dufferin as guests.

=== Shahbag ===
Abdul Ghani restored former property of Aratun and Cook to its lost glory as Bag-e-Badshahi (the Imperial Garden) of the Mughals, and renamed it Shahbag. He expanded the area further by buying land from the son of Nuruddin Hossain, who set up Nurkhan Bazar in the area. It was further expanded by more land bought in 1876–77, bringing the whole land area to 26.5 hectares. He started the garden house in 1873, which took several years to complete.

=== Buckland Bund ===
Abdul Ghani was the first to donate funds for the project undertaken by City Commissioner C T Buckland to create a dam to protect Dhaka from flooding and river erosion, along with Kalinarayan Roy, the zamindar of Bhawal. In the 1870s, he also undertook its extension westward from Wiseghat. Like the Strand, the Buckland Bund came to serve Dhaka people as a promenade of enjoyment. It is where the Bhawal Sannyasi appeared covered in ashes.

=== Dilkusha ===
In 1866, Nawab abdul ghani purchased the land near the lake of Motijheel from E F Smith and made there a garden-house named Dilkusha for his son Khwaja Ahsanullah. Later, he expanded the garden by buying land from Armenian zaminder Manuk, whose name is still borne by a building in the Bangabhaban, official residence of the President of Bangladesh. This Manuk House was a part of the land that was acquired by the British Governor General of India from the Dhaka Nawab Family.

=== Dhaka News ===
Abdul Ghani was one of the proprietors (1856–1858) of the Weekly Dhaka News, the first English newspaper from Dhaka. It was edited by Alenzander R. Forbes as a planters' journal and printed by the first printing press in Dhaka, the Dhaka News Press, founded in 1856.

=== Dances ===
Abdul Ghani was a great patron of the arts of the baijees, the hereditary dancing girls introduced to Bengal by Wajid Ali Shah, the Nawab of Awadh. Baijees, known as the Tawaif in Northern India, danced a special form of Kathak focused at popular entertainment along with singing mostly in the form of Thumri. Apart from the Nawab's mansions they also danced at Durga puja and at European mansions at that time.

During his reign, baijees used to perform regularly for mehfils and mujras at the Rangmahal of Ahsan Manzil, Ishrat Manzil of Shahbagh, and the garden house of Dilkusha. The performance of Mushtari Bai at Shahbag earned much praise from eminent littérateur Abdul Gafur Naskhan. The most prominent baijees were Suponjan, Mushtari Bai, Piyari Bai, Heera Bai, Wamu Bai and Abedi Bai. Among them Suponjan married Swapan Khan, grandson of singer and tabla maestro Mithan Khan.

=== Theater ===
Abdul Ghani introduced the first female performers on Dhaka theater stages. In 1876, he invited a theater troupe from Bombay to stage two Hindi plays, Indrasabha and Yadunagar, featuring three sisters among performers – Annu Bai, Nannu Bai and Nawabin Bai.

=== Donations ===
- For construction of Buckland Bund: Rs 35,000.00
- For renovation of Hoseni Dalan: Rs 20,000.00
- For construction of road leading to tomb of Shah Ali Baghdadi^{[note 1]}: Rs 10,000.00
- For construction of a Female Ward in Mitford Hospital: Rs 25,000.00
- For victims of famine^{[note 2]}: Rs 10,000.00
- For the victims of the flood^{[note 3]}: Rs 10,000.00
- For Lady Dufferin Relief Fund: Rs 10,000.00
- For wounded soldiers of Russo-Turkish War (1787–92): Rs 20,000.00
- For victims of an earthquake in Kashmir: Rs 20,000.00
- For riot victims of Atiya: Rs 10,000.00
- For wounded soldiers of the Franco-Prussian War: Rs 5,000.00
- For Cholera Relief Funds in Italy and France^{[note 4]}: Rs 2,000.00
- For victims of famine in Iran: Rs 3,000.00
- For victims of famine in Lancashire: Rs 7,000.00
- For victims of famine in Ireland: Rs 3,000.00
- For renovation of Nahr-i-Zubaida at Mecca: Rs 40,000.00

== Footnotes ==
- ^ Note 1:Shah Ali Bagdadi: A 15th century sufi saint from Baghdad and a disciple of Shah Bahar of the Chistia. His tomb is in Mirpur (Dhaka)
- ^ Note 2:Famine of 1866: Orissa and parts of Bengal was badly affected, and a Famine Commission was established for the first time.
- ^ Note 3:Flood of 1885: River Bhagirathi burst embankment to seriously affect Satkhira and Khulna. Reported in detail by Flood Committee Report (1927).
- ^ Note 4:Cholera epidemic of 1884: The epidemic killed more than 14,000 people in Naples alone, leading to a national funding of a massive reconstruction plan in Italy and France.
