= Khwaja Alimullah =

- Nawab of Dhaka
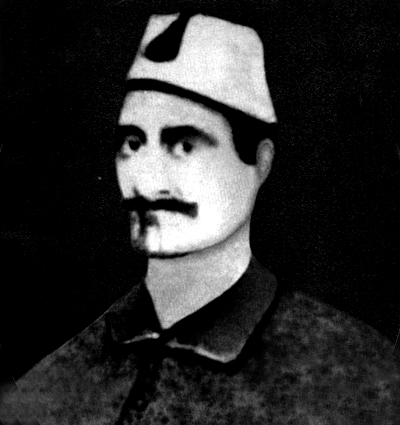
- Reign: 1815–1854
- Predecessor: Khwaja Hafizullah (as Zamindar)
- Successor: Nawab Khwaja Abdul Ghani
- Born: 11 February 1772; Begum Bazaar, Bengal Presidency, British India
- Died: 24 August 1854 (aged 82); Dacca, Bengal, British India
- Burial: Begum Bazaar; Dhaka, Bangladesh
- Spouses: 6, including Zeenat Begum
- Issue: Khwaja Abdul Ghani
- House: Dhaka Nawab Family
- Father: Khwaja Ahsanullah
- Religion: Sunni Islam

Khwaja Alimullah (died 24 August 1854) was the first Nawab of Dhaka. He was the founder of the Dhaka Nawab family.

Alimullah was the nephew and heir of the merchant prince Khwaja Hafizullah, son of Khwaja Ahsanullah, and father of Khwaja Abdul Ghani, the first Nawab of Dhaka to be recognised by the British Raj.

== Background ==
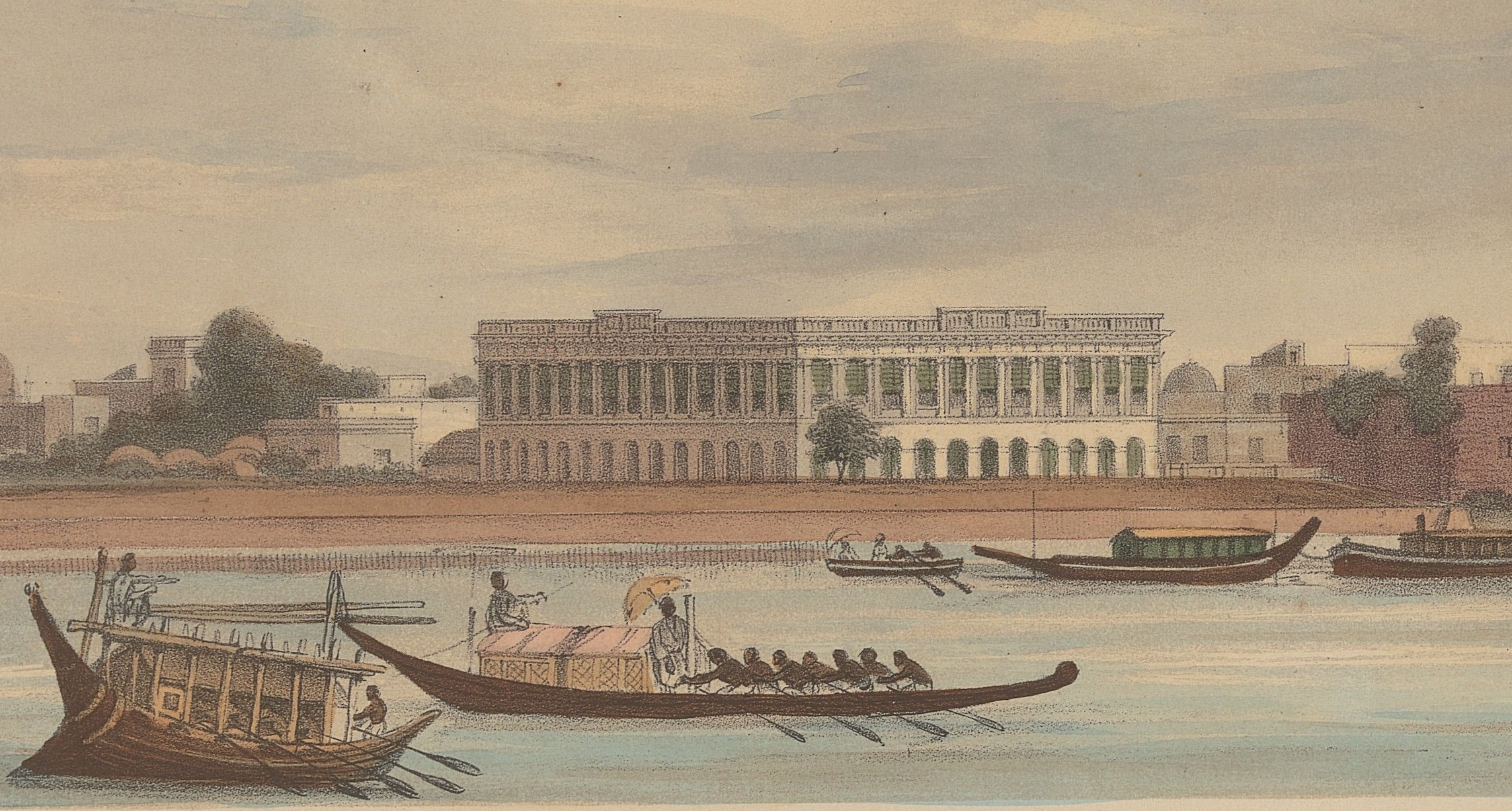
House of Alimullah on the bank of Buriganga in 1847

The ancestors of the Khwajas were said to have been traders of gold dust and leather in Kashmir. The earliest founder of the Dhaka Nawab Estate is Khwaja Hafizullah, who upheld the family tradition and made his fortune in trade and commerce. Leather and salt were the major items of his business. In collaboration with the European merchants in Dhaka, he developed a flourishing business in hides, skins, salt and spices.

== Early life ==
Hafizullah raised Alimullah, following the early death of Ahsanullah (his elder brother and Alimullah's father) in 1795, and groomed him as an estate manager.

Alimullah took major responsibilities in Hafizullah's business. The enterprising Alimullah bought agricultural lands in and around Dhaka, as well as in Barisal District and Mymensingh District. He operated a moneylending business and was a founder of The Dacca Bank (1846), the first European-style bank in Dhaka. The bank is also notable for being the very first private bank started in the present day country of Bangladesh. He became one of the major shareholders and a director of the bank. The bank was acquired by the Bank of Calcutta. The last few branches of the bank were shut in 1877 and were gradually replaced by the branches of the Bank of Calcutta.

During this time, zamindari estates of defaulting proprietors were on sale everywhere in Bengal under the operation of Permanent Settlement. Hafizullah purchased estates and indigo factories in Barisal. Those purchases included Atia pargana in the then Mymensingh district (now in the Tangail district) and Aila Phuljhuri in the Bakarganj Sundarbans.

After Hafizullah's death, his estate descended on Alimullah, his sole heir. His acquisitions were added to those of his uncle, making the united zamindari one of the province's largest.

== Foundation of the estate ==
Before his death (1854), Alimullah made a waqf (vestment) to turning all his property into an indivisible family concern. The property was to be managed jointly by a mutwali (administrator), a responsibility that descended on his second son Khwaja Abdul Ghani Mia.

This measure saved the Khwaja Estate from sub-division and fragmentation as happened to other landed estates. It empowered the Mutawalli to administer the waqf estate and other concerns of the family as representative and sole spokesman. He distributed the family income in the form of individual allowances stipulated in the waqfnama (deed of the waqf).

== Works ==
Alimullah served on the Dhaka Municipal Committee, taking part in the corporate activities of the city, including playing an important role in the preservation of Lalbagh Fort. He made a waqf of the income of his estate at Atiya Pargana in Tangail for the welfare of the destitute.

Following the death of Ghaziuddin Haider, the last of the Naib Nazims of Dhaka in 1843, Alimullah bore all the expenses of Muharram, the central festival of the Shi'ites, and was appointed by the government as the mutwali of Hussaini Dalan, the shrine of the Shi'ites in Dhaka.

Through a long association with Eurasian and European business partners, he acquired their lifestyle and habits. He bought thoroughbred horses for racing and built a modest stable. He hunted with horses and elephants. He earned recognition as an organiser of sports by setting up the Ramna Racecourse and the Gymkhana Club.

Besides sports and games, Alimullah developed a fancy for jewels. He purchased the famous diamond Dariya-i-Noor at a government auction. He bought many unique jewellery of the house of the Naib Nazim Ghaziuddin Haider when he became heavily indebted due to the English government stopping his allowance on charges of immoral activities.

Alimullah introduced dance, music and mushairah (literary meet) into the Khwaja family.

=== Ahsan Manzil ===
In 1830, Alimullah purchased the French Trading House at Kumartuli on the bank of the Buriganga as part of his land acquisitions in and around Dhaka. The French bought it from Matiullah, whose father, Sheikh Enayetullah, a zamindar of Jamalpur pargana in Barisal during Mughal reign. He built it as his Rang Mahal (pleasure house). Alimullah converted it into his residence, following reconstruction and renovations. This mini palace subsequently became the nucleus of the Ahsan Manzil, the residential palace and the kachari (administrative office) of the Nawabs of Dhaka. It is now a national heritage museum.

=== Baigunbari Hunting Park ===
The Hunting Park at Baigunbari, Sadullahpur mauja, Biralia Union, Savar, was a hunting and pleasure park of the Nawabs of Dhaka. Alimullah proclaimed the forest land of Sadullapur as a wildlife sanctuary, and started the hunting park (completed by Khwaja Abdul Ghani). The hunting park featured species of indigenous and exotic deer, peacocks, wild-cocks, francoline partridges and hares. Huntable hogs and various birds lived on the banks of the forest lakes. By 1895, the area set apart as an exclusive hunting ground for the Nawab and his guests became an attraction for poachers.

=== Daria-i-Noor ===
Alimullah purchased the diamond Daria-i-Noor (Dhaka) [Sea of Light; Persian: دريا (Daria, meaning Sea), Persian: نور (Noor, meaning Light)] for 75 thousand rupees when it was auctioned on behalf of the British government by Hamilton and Company of Calcutta in November 1852. It was auctioned after it was exhibited, along with another famous Indian diamond Koh-i-Noor or the "mountain of light", in 1850 at the Great Exhibition at Hyde Park organised in honour of Queen Victoria. As it did not get the expected price at the exhibitions, Daria-i-Noor was sent back to India to be sold in an auction.

The 26-carat table-cut diamond was largest and most precious jewel stone in Bangladesh. It is believed to be quarried in a south Indian mine, like the Koh-i-Noor. It is set in the Centre of a gold armlet, with ten 5-carat (1 g) oval shaped smaller diamonds around it, used by the Nawabs of Dhaka, who also used as it an ornament on the turban. It was preserved in a vault of Sonali Bank and disappeared suddenly.

=== Shahbag ===
In 1840, Alimullah bought the two garden-houses set up by Aratun, the Armenian businessman, and Griffith Cook, the British Justice, in the Sujatpur area. He renamed the area as Shahbag (Garden of Kings) and started a project to bring back the splendour to the area known in the Mughal times as Bag-e-Badshahi (also Garden of Kings). He also bought much of vast meadow, known as Ramna, between the garden houses and the Sujatpur Palace flanked by Nurkhan Bazaar (set up by Nuruddin Hossain).

== Death and legacy ==
Alimullah had six wives and three consorts, including Basanti Bibi, Nargis Bibi, and Zeenat Begum.

His children were;

- Muzaffar Khwaja (s/o Basanti Bibi).
- Hamdan Khanam (d/o Nargis Bibi). Married Wazir Ali Syed Khwaja, and had one son, Najmuddin Ahmed Syed Khwaja.
- Mansur Khwaja (s/o Amir Jan Bibi). Married Hurunnesa Bibi, and ten children (Maksud Khwaja; Manzoor Khwaja; Masrur Khwaja; Mashkoor Khwaja; Jane Alam Khwaja; Alimullah Khwaja; Kalimullah Khwaja; Rabeya Begum; Takmil Begum and Husna Bano)
- Nawab Sir Khwaja Abdul Ghani (s/o Zeenat Bibi). Had four wives (Ismatun Nesa Begum; Umda Khanam; Munni Bibi and Dulhan Bibi). Had nine children (Nawab Sir Khwaja Ahsanullah; Ayesha Khanam; Nurjahan Khanam; Baqi Khwaja; Saqi Khwaja; Saleha Khanam; Munira Bakki Bibi Khanam; Karimullah Khwaja and Abdus Sattar Nannna Khwaja)
- Velayeti Khanam (d/o Zeenat Bibi).
- Bari Khanam (d/o Zeenat Bibi).
- Abdul Hamid Khwaja (s/o Ghasi Bibi).
- Abdun Nabi Khwaja (s/o Ghasi Bibi).
- Umdatunnesa Begum (d/o Ghasi Bibi).
- Abdul Latif Khwaja (s/o Bi Jan Bibi).
- Hosaini Bibi (d/o Ayub Bibi). Married Abdul Mahdi Khwaja, and had one son, Khwaja Yusuf Jan.
