= Kartalab Khan Mosque =

Mosque in Dhaka, Bangladesh

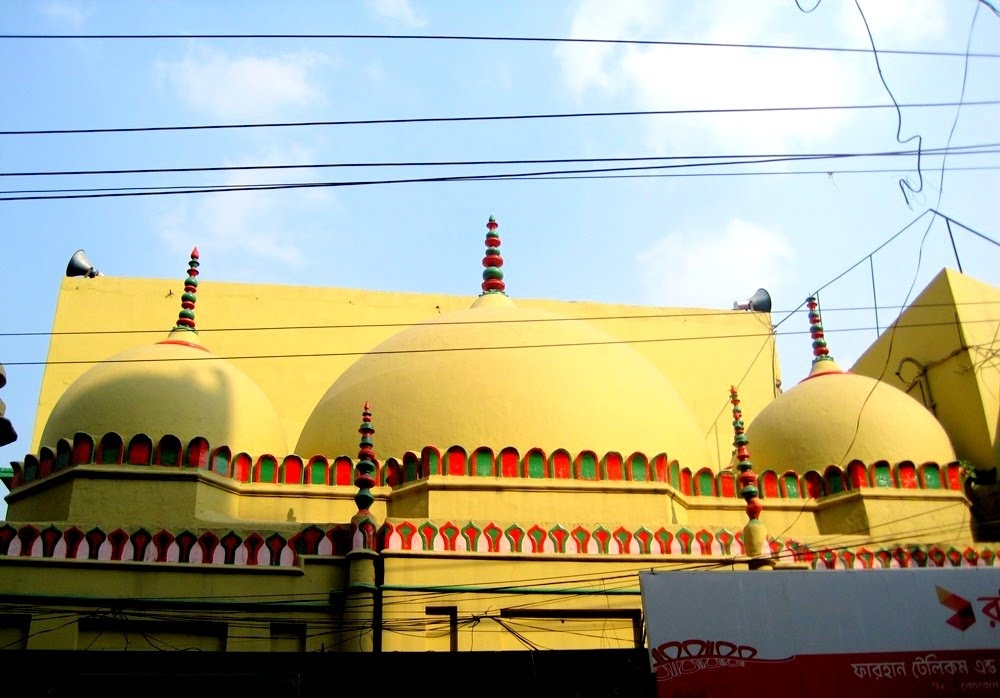
- The mosque in 2012

- Location within Dhaka

Religion
- Affiliation: Islam
- Ecclesiastical or organisational status: Mosque
- Status: Active

Location
- Location: Old City, Dhaka
- Country: Bangladesh
- Coordinates: 23°43′01″N 90°23′55″E

Architecture
- Architect: Nawab Diwan Murshid Quli Khan
- Type: Mosque architecture
- Style: Mughal
- Completed: 1704 CE

Specifications
- Dome: Five
- Minaret: Five
- Materials: Bricks, sand, lime

The Kartalab Khan Mosque, also known as the Begum Bazar Mosque, is a mosque, located in the Begum Bazar area in the Old City of Dhaka, Bangladesh. It was built by Nawab Diwan Murshid Quli Khan (alias Kartalab Khan) between 1700 and 1704 CE. The mosque consists of a high vaulted platform, a mosque with a 'dochala' annex on the north upon the western half of the platform and a 'Baoli' (stepped well) to the east of the platform. It is roofed by five domes resting on octagonal drums. The mosque was extensively renovated by Mirza Golam Pir in the nineteenth century. In accordance with Murshid Quli Khan's wishes, he was buried under the entrance to this mosque.

== History ==
Kartalab Khan Mosque is one of the largest Mughal mosques in Dhaka. It is built on a high platform called a tahkhana. Underneath the platform there is a series of rectangular rooms that are let out to shopkeepers. A fish market was built to meet the expenses of the mosque.

The 'Baoli', the only known example of its kind in Bengal, is considered to be of North Indian or Deccan origin, the latter possibility being more likely since its builder had been in the Deccan before coming to Dhaka.

In 1777, the control of the market was taken over by Begum daughter of the then Naib-e-Nazim Sharfaraz Khan. The name of the locality 'Begumbazar' and possibly that of the mosque originate from her name. Another possibility is that it was named after a mutawallī (administrator) of the mosque.

== Architectural value ==
As stated by archaeologist Ahmad Hasan Dani,

The mosque proper also shows a departure from the earlier buildings. The older features of the three-domed mosque are here repeated and multiplied so as to make a five-domed mosque. The facade shows five entrances, each separated from the other by slender minaret rising high above the battlemented parapet. Similarly the corner towers have their kiosks shooting above.

== See also ==
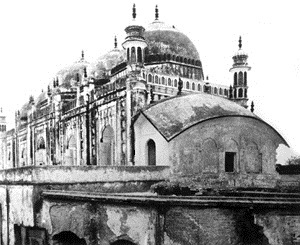
Old image of Begum Bazar Mosque

- Islam in Bangladesh
- List of mosques in Bangladesh
