= Azimpur =

Azimpur may refer to:

- Azimpur, a neighborhood in Dhaka
- Azimpur Government Girls' School and College
- Azimpur Mosque
- Azimpur Dayera Sharif Khanqah
- Viqarunnisa Noon School and College, Azimpur Branch
