= Shah Amanat =

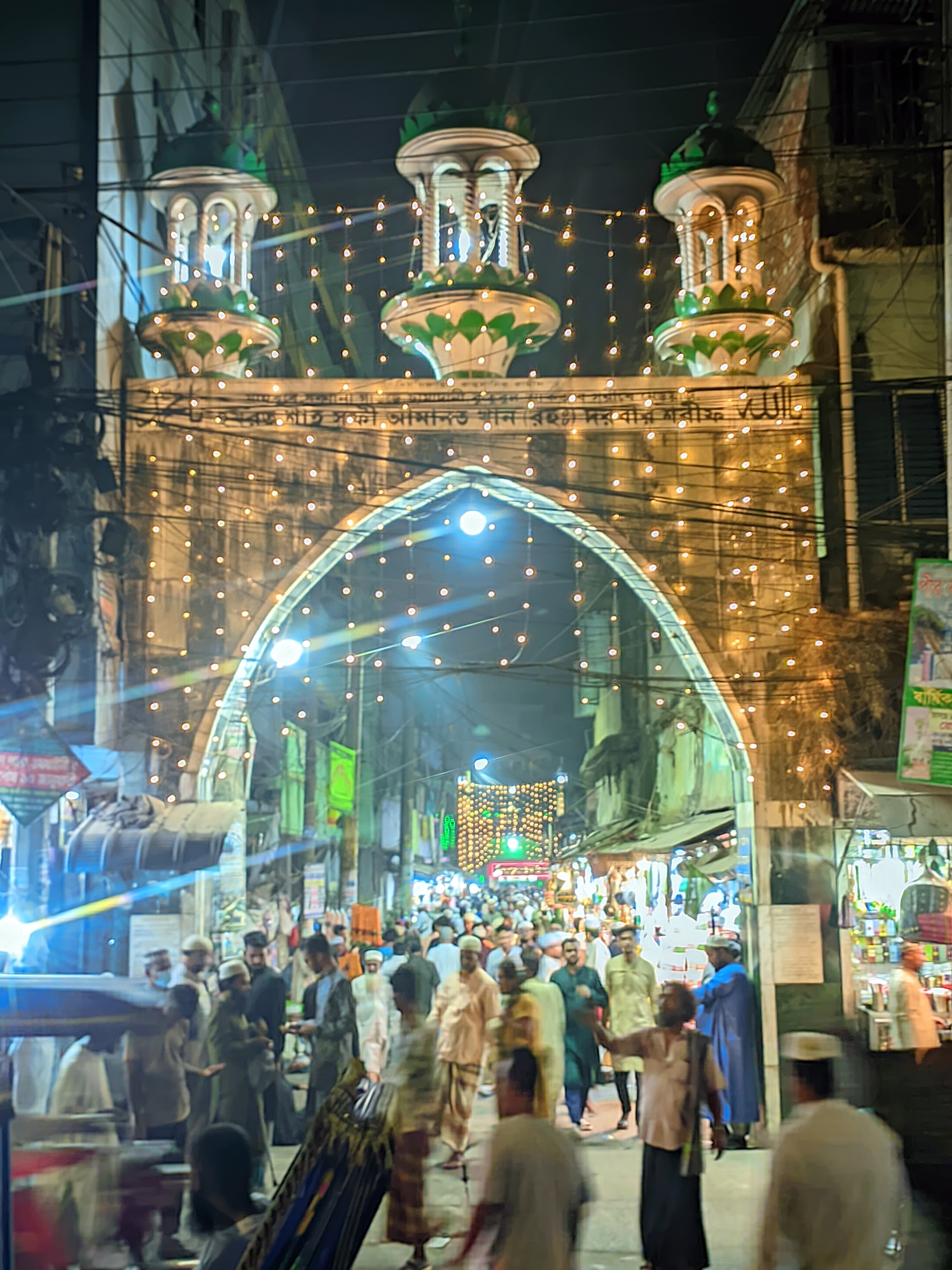
- Shah Amanat Shrine Draws Thousands on the 27th Night of Ramadan

Personal life
- Born: Shah Amanat Khan Bihar Sharif, Bihar Division, Bengal Presidency
- Died: 1773 Laldighi, Islamabad, Chittagong District, Bengal Presidency
- Resting place: Quddus Serrahul Aziz Darbar Sharif
- Spouse: Umm Anwar
- Children: Shahzada Muhammad Anwar Khan
- Other name: Amanot Shah

Religious life
- Religion: Islam
- Denomination: Sunni
- School: Hanafi
- Tariqa: Naqshbandi

Muslim leader
- Based in: Chittagong
- Period in office: 18th century
- Successor: Shahzada Muhammad Anwar Khan
- Disciple of: Abdur Rahim Rizvi
- Disciples: Muhammad Dayem, Sufi Keyam Uddin, Sufi Meah Haji Daulat
- Arabic name
- Personal (Ism): Amānatullāh أمانت الله
- Patronymic (Nasab): ibn Niʿmatullāh Khān بن نعمت الله خان
- Toponymic (Nisba): al-Bihārī البهاري

Amānatullāh Khān (died 1773), better known as Shāh Amānat and Amānat Shāh, was an 18th-century Sufi Muslim figure in South Asia. He is regarded as one of the most prominent saints of Chittagong, in eastern Bengal (now Bangladesh).

== Life ==
Shah Amanat was born into a Muslim family of Iraqi Arab origin. His forefathers migrated from Baghdad to Bihar; they were descendants of Abdul Qadir Gilani. His father's name was Niyamat. Shah Amanat later migrated to Bengal. In Murshidabad, Shah Amanat became a disciple of and pledged bay'ah to a Kashmiri Sufi scholar by the name of Shah Abdur Rahim Rizvi, for a number of years. Shah Abdur Rahim was the grandson of Khwaja Masum, the son of Ahmad Sirhindi. Shah Amanat travelled across the subcontinent to learn about Islam in places such as Delhi, Lucknow and Kashmir.

After 12 years, Shah Abdur Rahim advised Shah Amanat to migrate to Chittagong. Shah Amanat built himself a small cottage in a forest area in Chittagong to live in. He managed to get a job as a punkah wallah at the Chittagong Judge Court, and preferred a simple lifestyle without attracting much attention. He would attend prayers at Nawab Muhammad Yasin Khan's Qadam Mubarak mosque. It was from this career at the court that he was nicknamed Meah Saheb.

However, after people realised his true identity, Shah Amanat began dedicating more of his public life towards religious propagation. Shah Amanat established Khanqah Amanatiya to preach Islam and the Naqshbandiya, Mujaddedia, Qadirriyya, Chishtiya and Madariya Sufi order. Khanqah Amanatiya later became a Sufi hub in British India, Pakistan and later in Bangladesh. One of his first disciple was Shah Sufi Muhammad Dayem of Dayera Sharif, Azimpur. He had numerous disciples spread across the Indian Subcontinent.

== Death and legacy ==
In 1773, at the age of 125 years this great Sufi mystic passed away leaving the Khanqah Amanatiya and his estate in the hands of his only son Shahzada Muhammad Anwar Khan and was buried near his Khanqah in a mazar (mausoleum). It is currently in the city of Chittagong; east of the Laldighi, Kotwali.

== Successors' history ==
Shah Amanat Khan left his Sufi dynasty to his only son Anwar Khan, also known as Shahzada Muhammad Anwar Khan. The successor of the Sufi dynasty is known as Sajjada Nashin, who serves the people.

Shahzada Alef Khan, only son of Shahzada Muhammad Anwar Khan, died before his father, leaving behind his son Shahzada Aliyar Khan. Shahzada Aliyar Khan became the Sajjada Nashin of the Dargah Sharif and Khanqah Amanatiya after his grand father Shahzada Anwar Khan died shortly after 1840 AD. He continued the legacy and managed Khanqah Amanatiya. The amount of free meals also known as Langar was increased at his time as people visiting the Dargah Sharif increased considerably. This system of providing Langar was established by Shah Sufi Amanat Khan in his Khanqah and continued till date by the Sajjada Nashins.

Shahzada Fazr Ali Khan, only son of Shahzada Aliyar Khan succeeded his father as the Sajjada Nashin of Dargah Sharif and Khanqah Amanatiya. After living a glorious Sufi life he died in 1890 AD leaving the Khanqah and Dargah Sharif on his son Shahzada Sher Ali Khan's responsibility.

Shahzada Sher Ali Khan had four sons: Shahzada Fouzul Kabir Khan (1914–1982), Shahzada Fouzul Azim Khan (1920–1978), Shahzada Fouzul Karim Khan (1923–1962), and Shahzada Fouzul Ali Khan (1935–2009). In 1942, when Shahzada Sher Ali Khan died, his four sons became the Sajjada Nashin of Dargah Sharif and Khanqah Amanatiya, and continued to serve the people and the path of Sufism. The sons of the four brothers became the Sajjada Nashin, the dynasty is currently under the supervision of them - the seventh generation of Shah Sufi Amanat Khan.

== Influence ==
Shah Sufi Amanat Khan's Dargah has been a place where people from different religions interconnect. His influence among the Bangladeshi people can be seen through the village songs, Sufi qawalis, and shops, institutions after his name. His name can also be seen on the body of many vehicles in Chittagong. Most of the Sufi lineages of Bangladesh comes from him.

The famous Shah Amanat Bridge was named after him. In Halishahar, there is a school named after Shah Amanat called the Shah Amanat Shishu Niketan. There is also a power and energy company called Shah Amanat Prakritik Gas Co. Ltd. owned by S. Alam Group of Industries. Shah Amanat International Airport was also named after him.

== Gallery ==
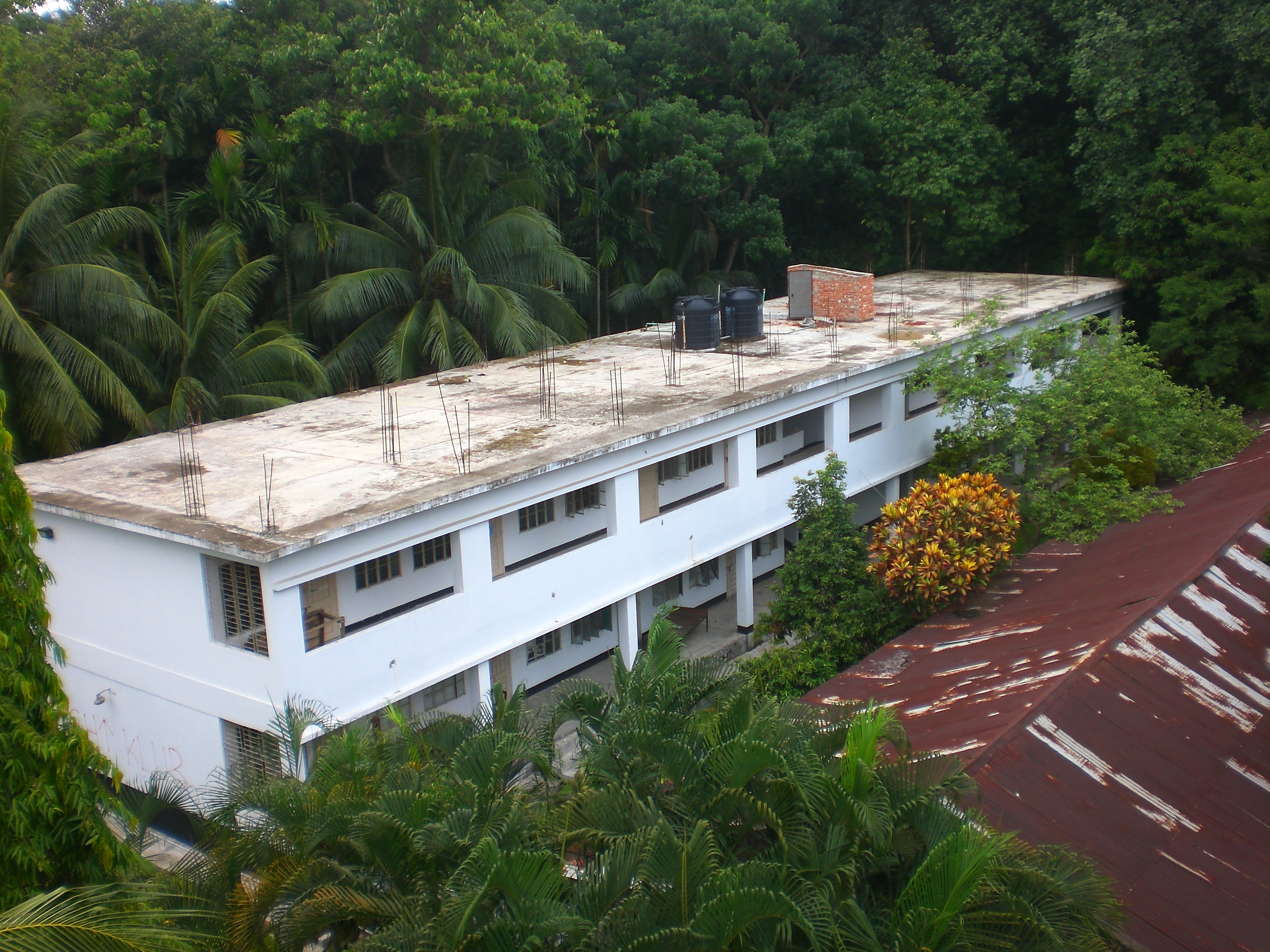
Shah Amanat Hall at the University of Chittagong.

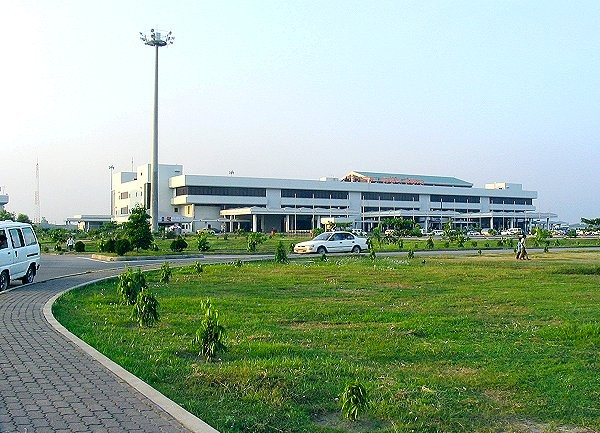
Shah Amanat International Airport, Patenga

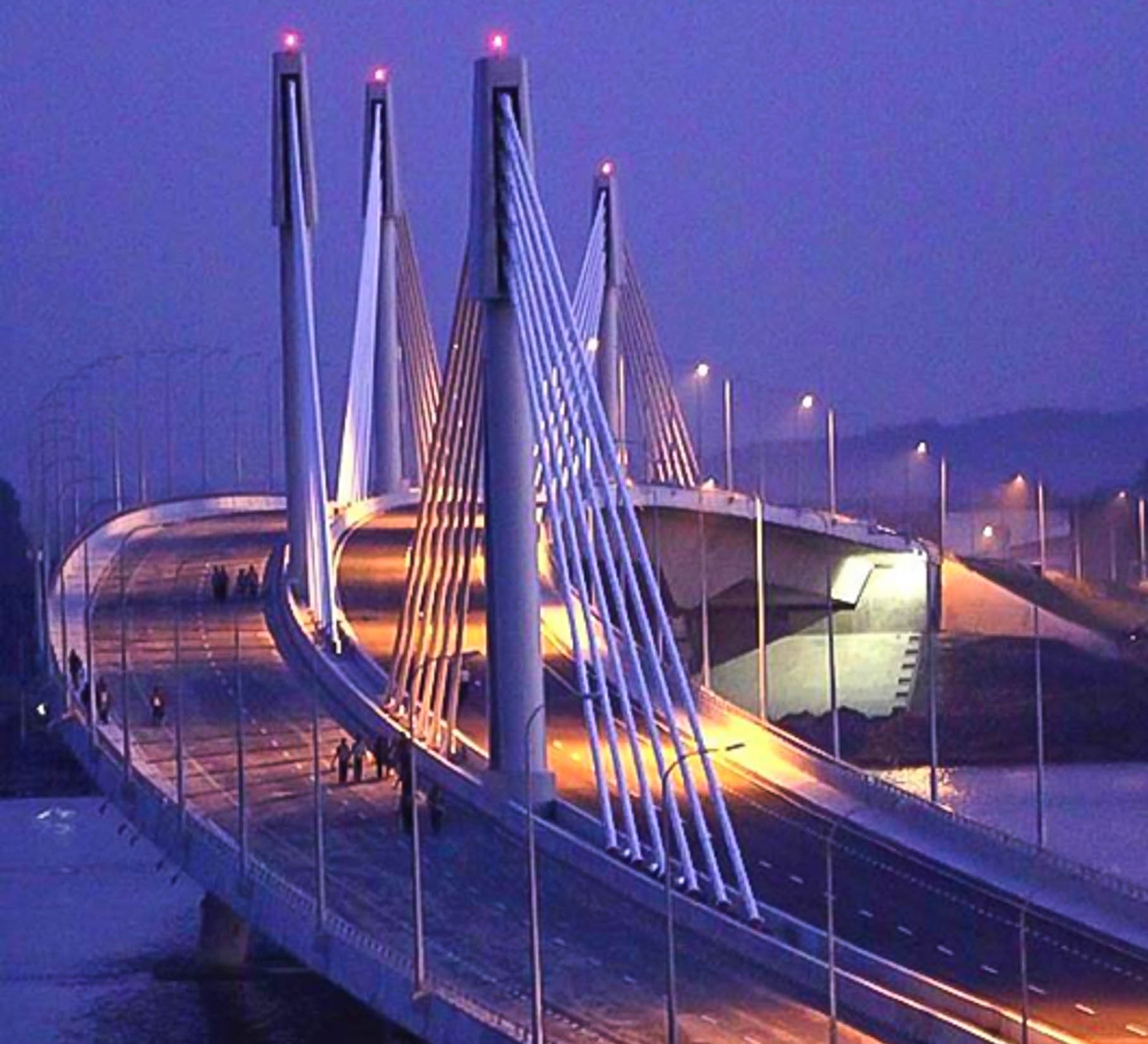
Shah Amanat Bridge
