= List of Old Dhaka Heritage Sites =

This is a list of Heritage Sites in Old Dhaka with properties of cultural and historical heritage in Bangladesh.

== Notable Heritage Sites ==
List of landmarks in this region:

Site	Image	Location
Ahsan Manzil		Kumartoli, Dhaka, Bangladesh
Armenian Church		Armanitola, Dhaka, Bangladesh
Ruplal House		Farashganj, Dhaka, Bangladesh
Azimpur Dayera Sharif		Azimpur, Dhaka, Bangladesh
Lalbagh Fort		Dhaka, Bangladesh
Northbrook Hall		Dhaka, Bangladesh
Hussaini Dalan		Dhaka, Bangladesh
Chhota Katra		Dhaka, Bangladesh
Bara Katra		Dhaka, Bangladesh
Beauty Boarding		Dhaka, Bangladesh
Bahadur Shah Park		Dhaka, Bangladesh
Star Mosque		Dhaka, Bangladesh
Dhakeshwari Temple		Dhaka, Bangladesh
Ramakrishna Mission Temple, Dhaka		Dhaka, Bangladesh

== See also ==
- List of archaeological sites in Bangladesh
