= Beauty Boarding =

- বিউটি বোর্ডিং
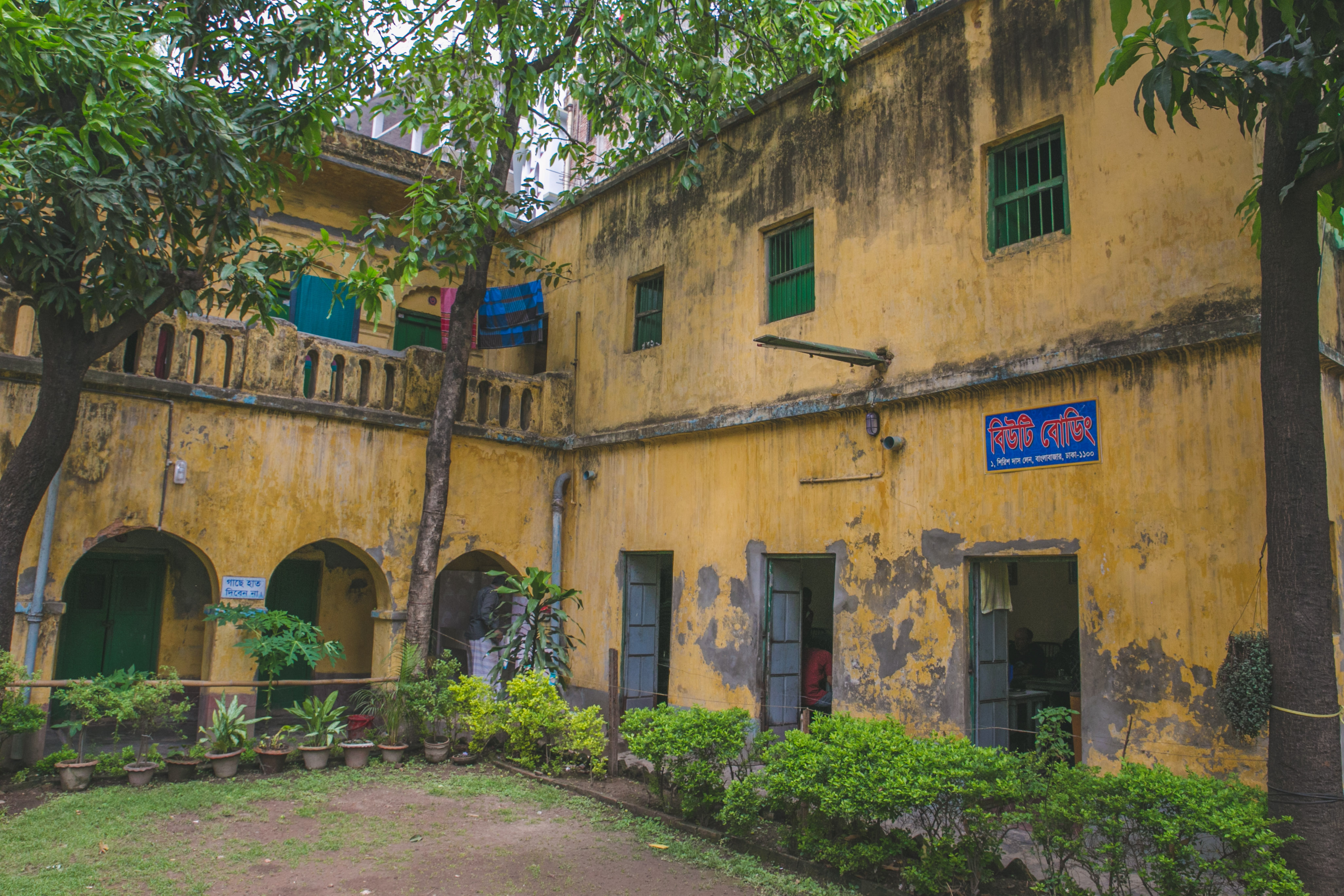
- Interactive map of the Beauty Boarding area

General information
- Location: Bangla bazar, Old Dhaka, Bangladesh
- Coordinates: 23.7063°N 90.4131°E
- List of Old Dhaka Heritage Sites

Beauty Boarding (Bengali: বিউটি বোর্ডিং) is a hotel and restaurant located in old Dhaka. It is a historical center of the intellectual gathering of Bengali authors, poets, cultural activists, and politicians. The place has been widely commemorated in their arts and writings. Currently, the place is popular for serving Bengali food.

== History ==
The building was originally a zamindar house and belonged to a zamindar named Shudheer Das. Before the Partition of India in 1947, the building was the office of the daily newspaper Shonar Bangla. By 1951, the newspaper had moved its office to Kolkata. When the newspaper left, the building was rented by a local neighbour, Nalini Mohon Saha, and he started a restaurant and boarding house there. The boarding house was named after Nalini Mohan Saha's eldest daughter, Beauty. Soon Beauty Boarding became a popular place to book traders from all over the country used to come to Banglabazar, the centre of book publishing, printing, and stationery wholesale market in Dhaka.

== Architecture ==
It is a two-storied building with an open central courtyard. There are long verandas in front of the boarding rooms.

== Photo Gallery ==
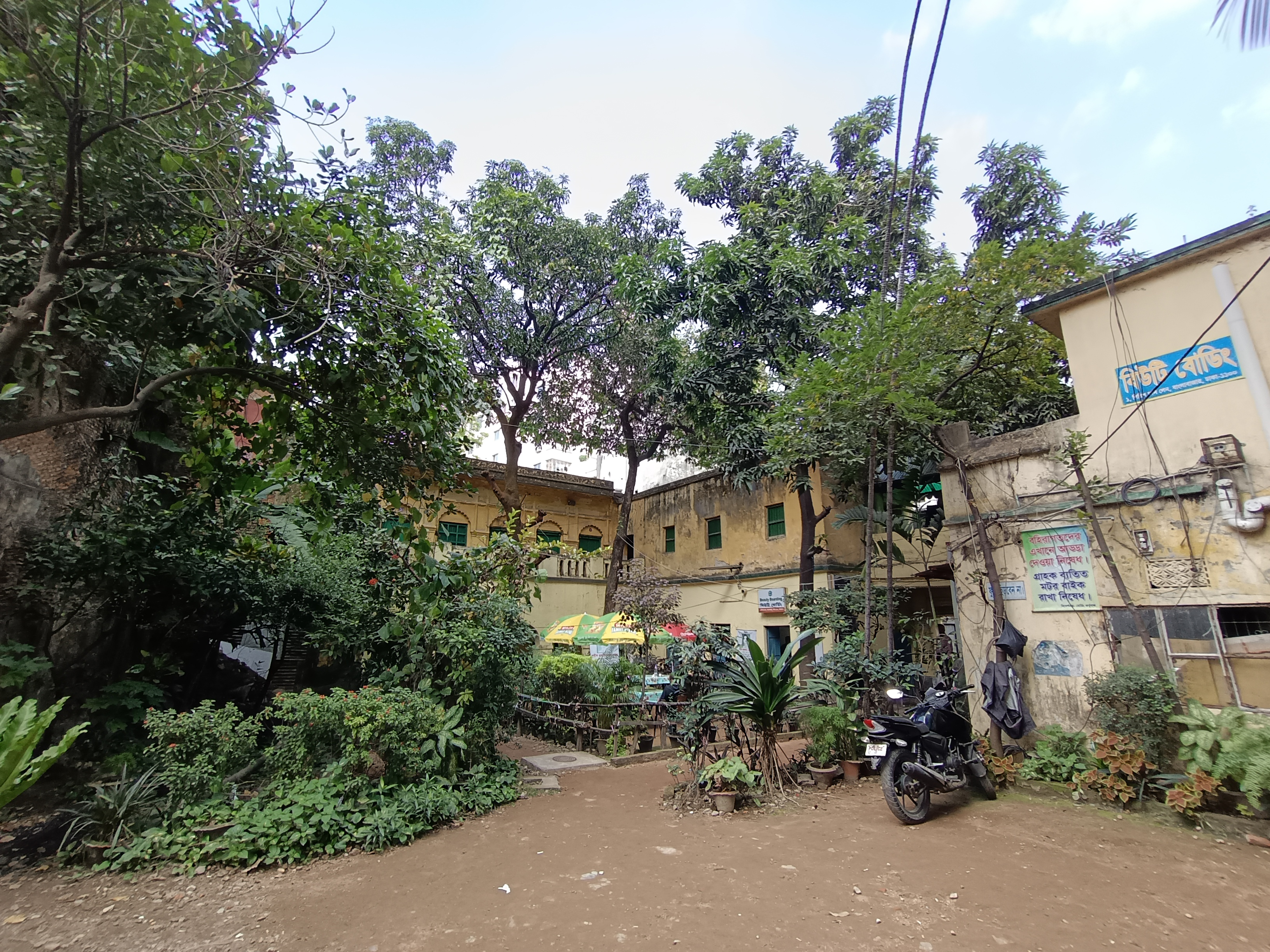

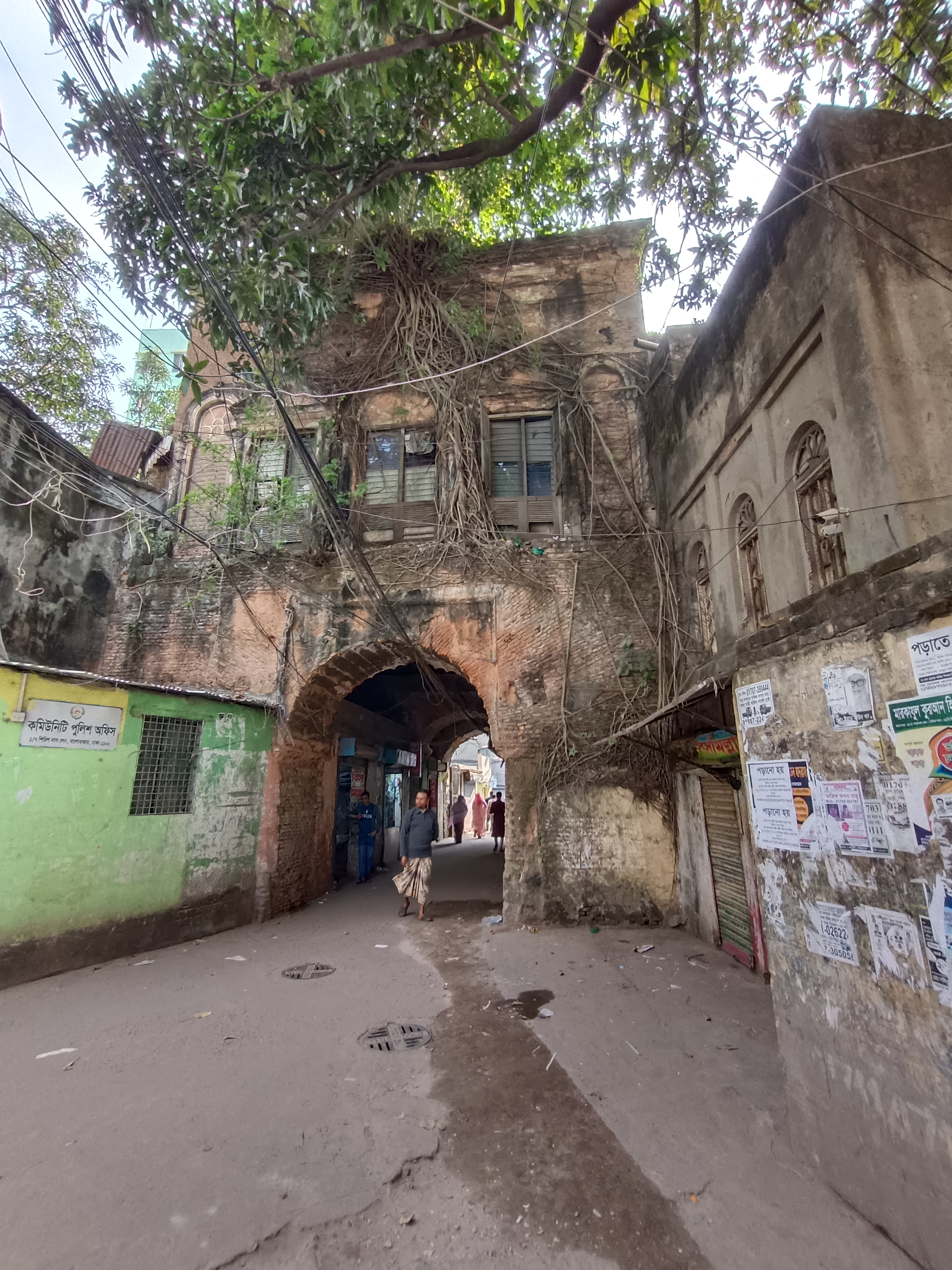

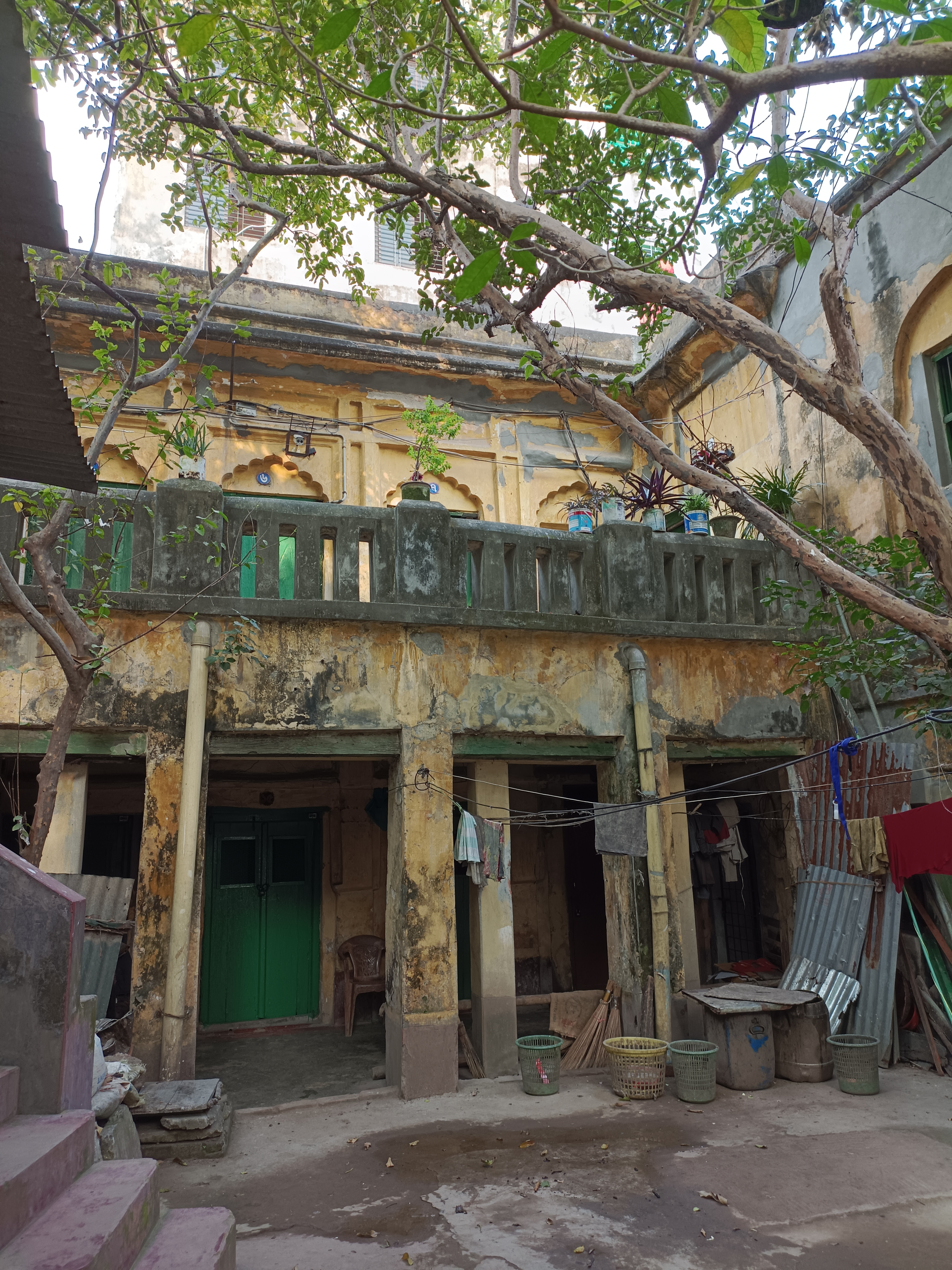

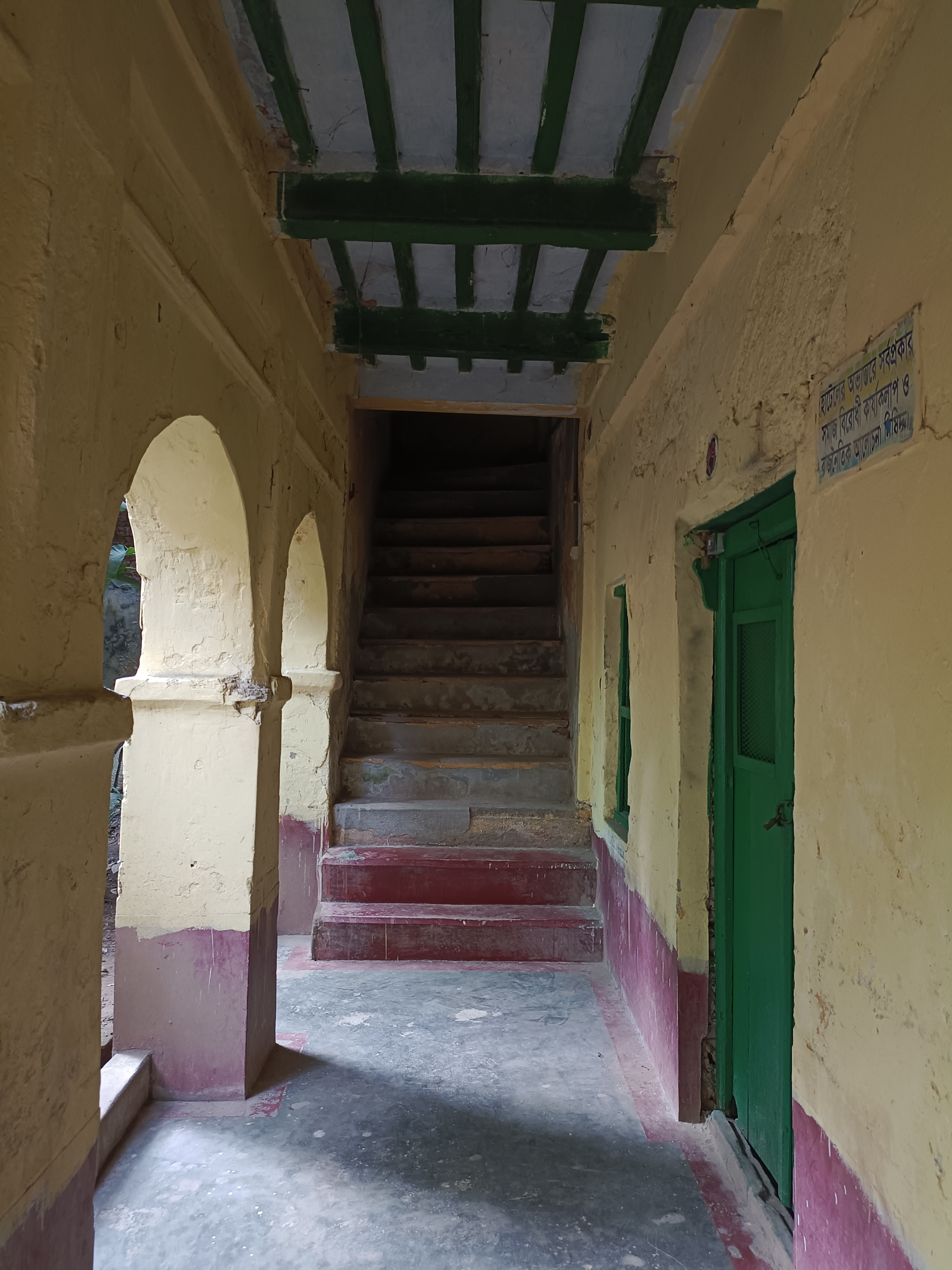

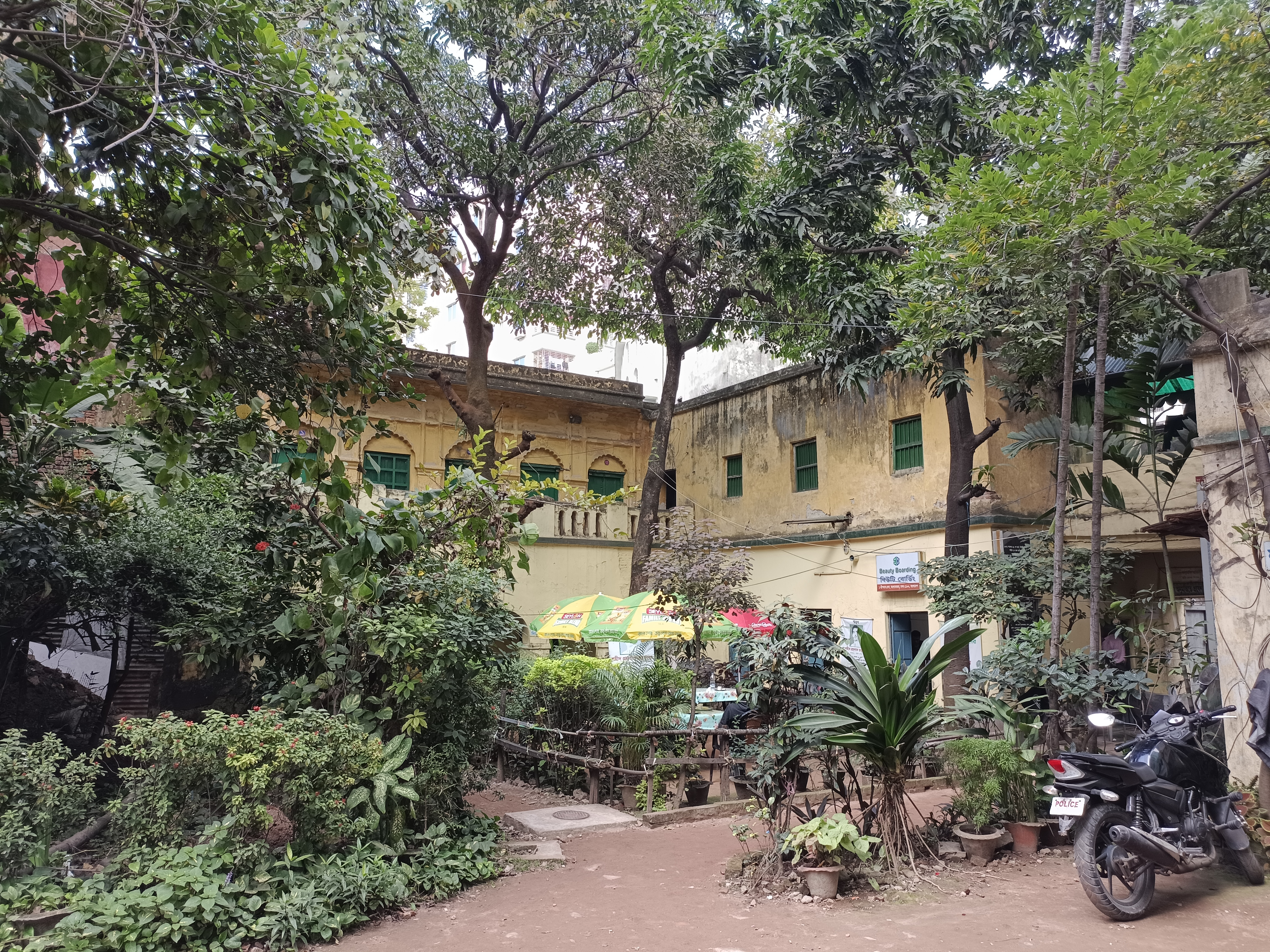

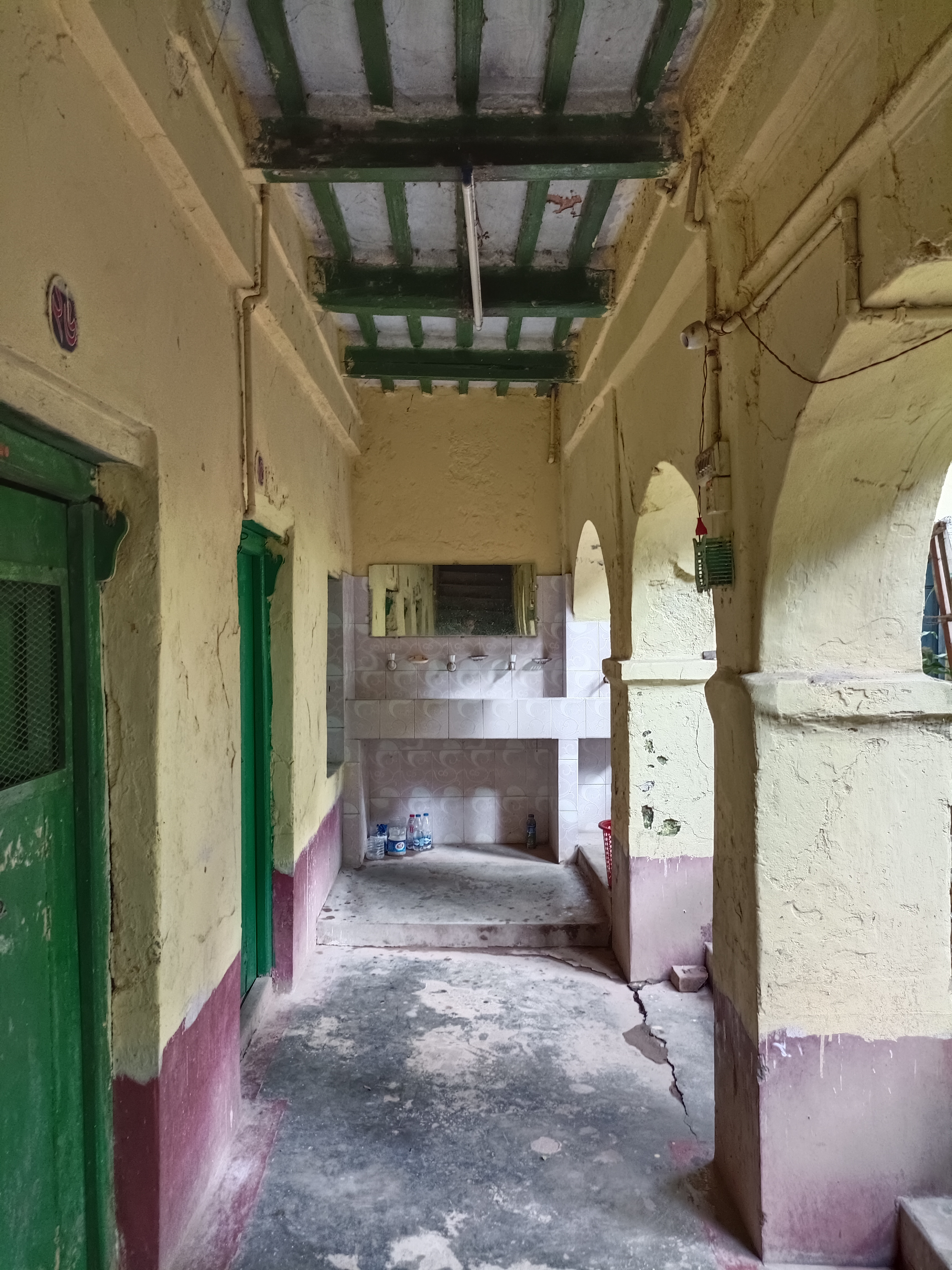

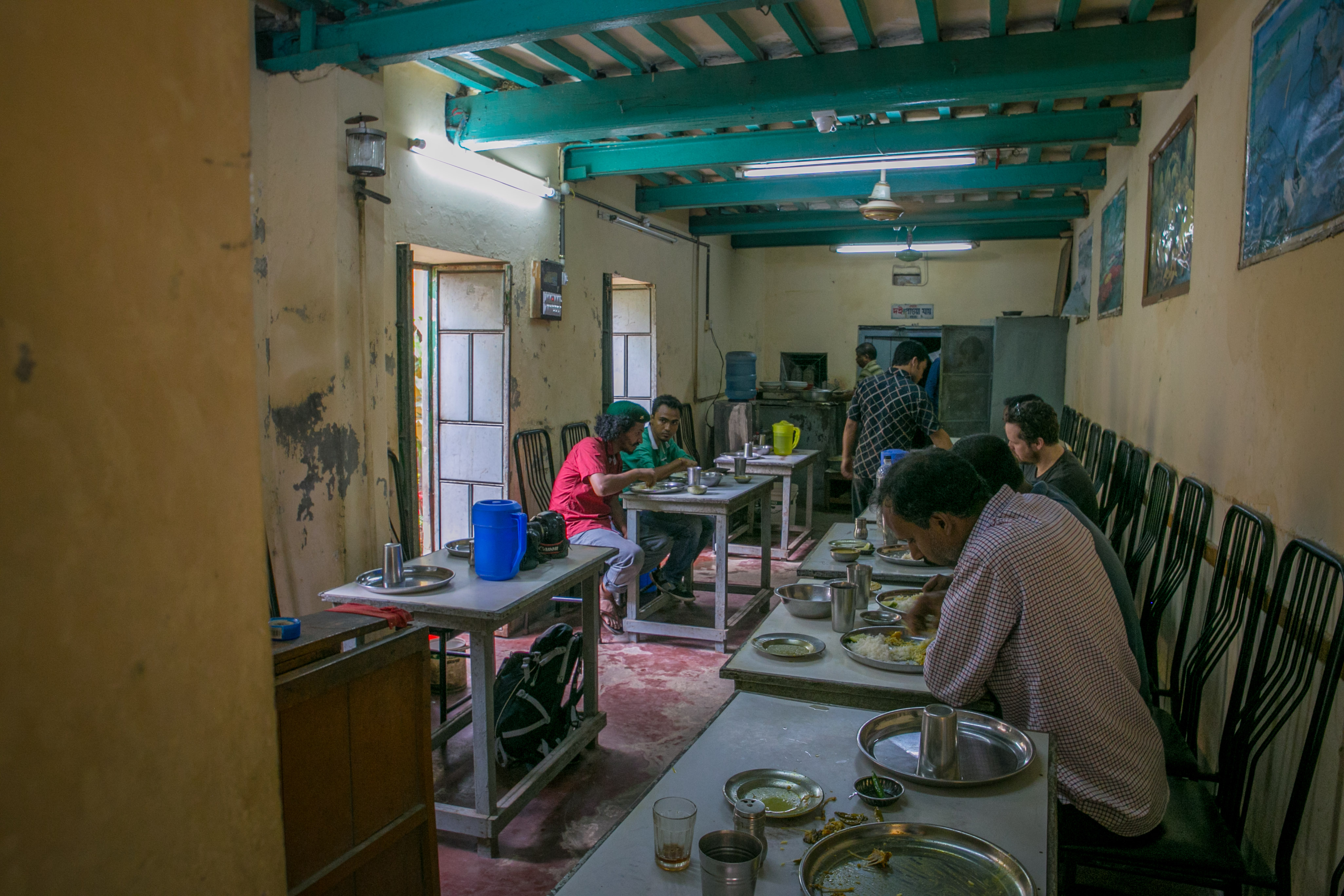

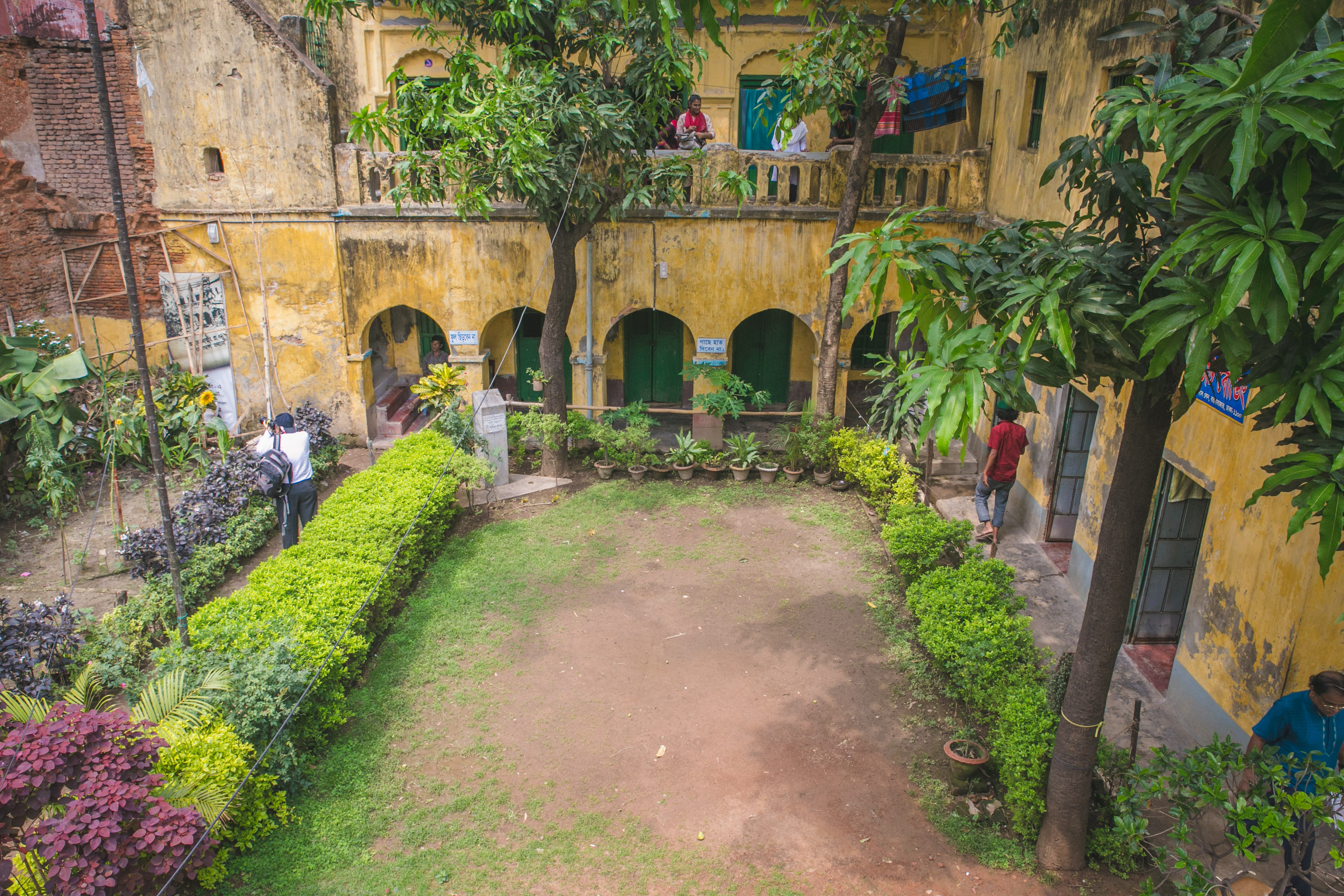

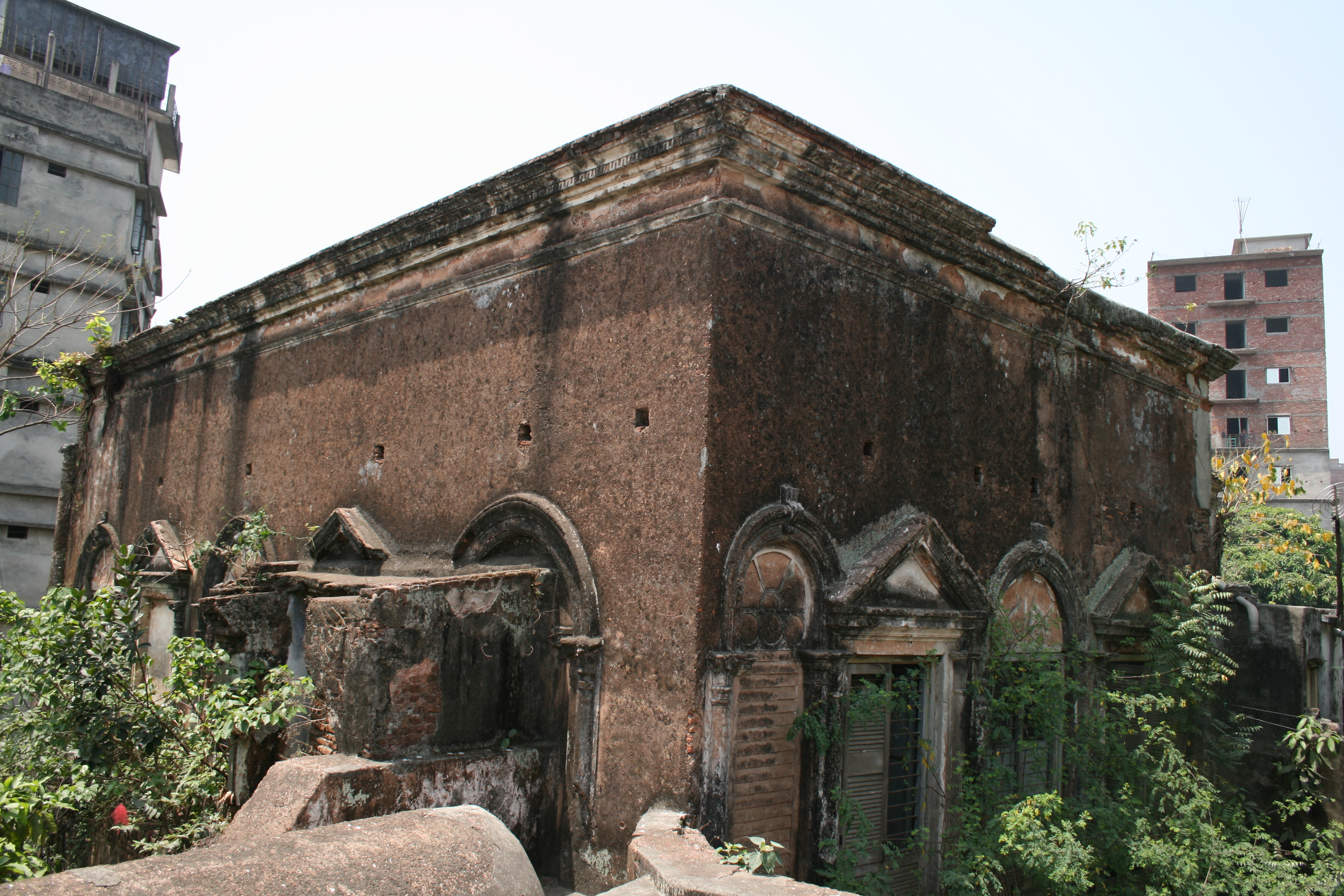

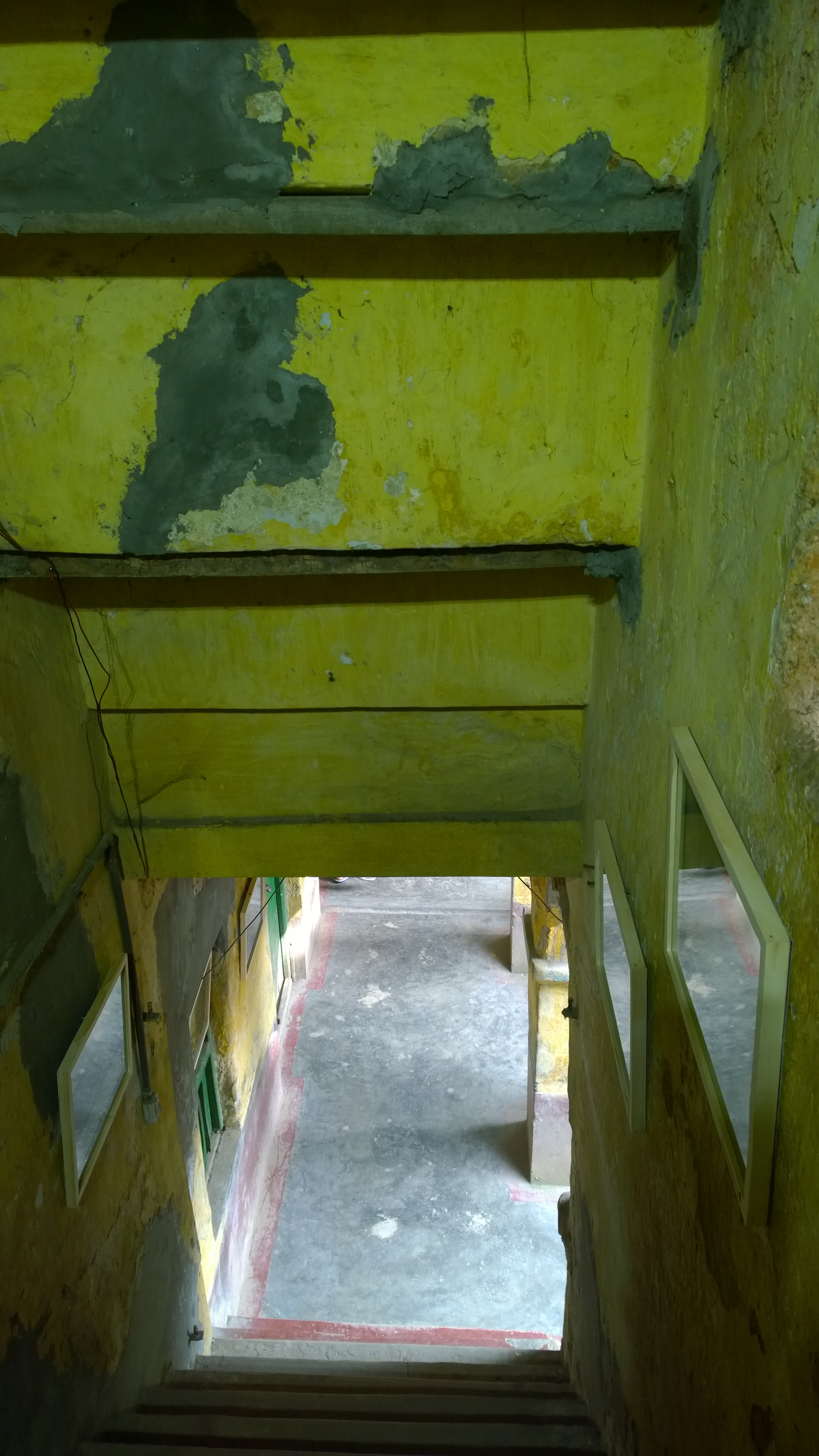

== Significance as a literary hub ==
It is said that Shahid Qadri, a renowned poet and writer of post-1947 modern Bangla poetry, first started literary gatherings there with his friends, and gradually the place became popular to poets and writers for its calm and green environment and availability of tea and snacks at a reasonable price. Famous Bengali poet Nirmalendu Goon lived in Beauty boarding for almost five years, and he notably mentioned this place in his autobiography. Poet and writer Syed Shamsul Huq created many of his famous works while in Beauty Boarding. Painter Debdas Chakrabartee and the poets Shamsur Rahman, Abu Zafar Obaidullah, Rafiq Azad, and Al Mahmud used to have their evening tea in this place.
