= Shah Amanat Bridge =

Shah Amanat Bridge Third Karnaphuli Bridge শাহ আমানত সেতু
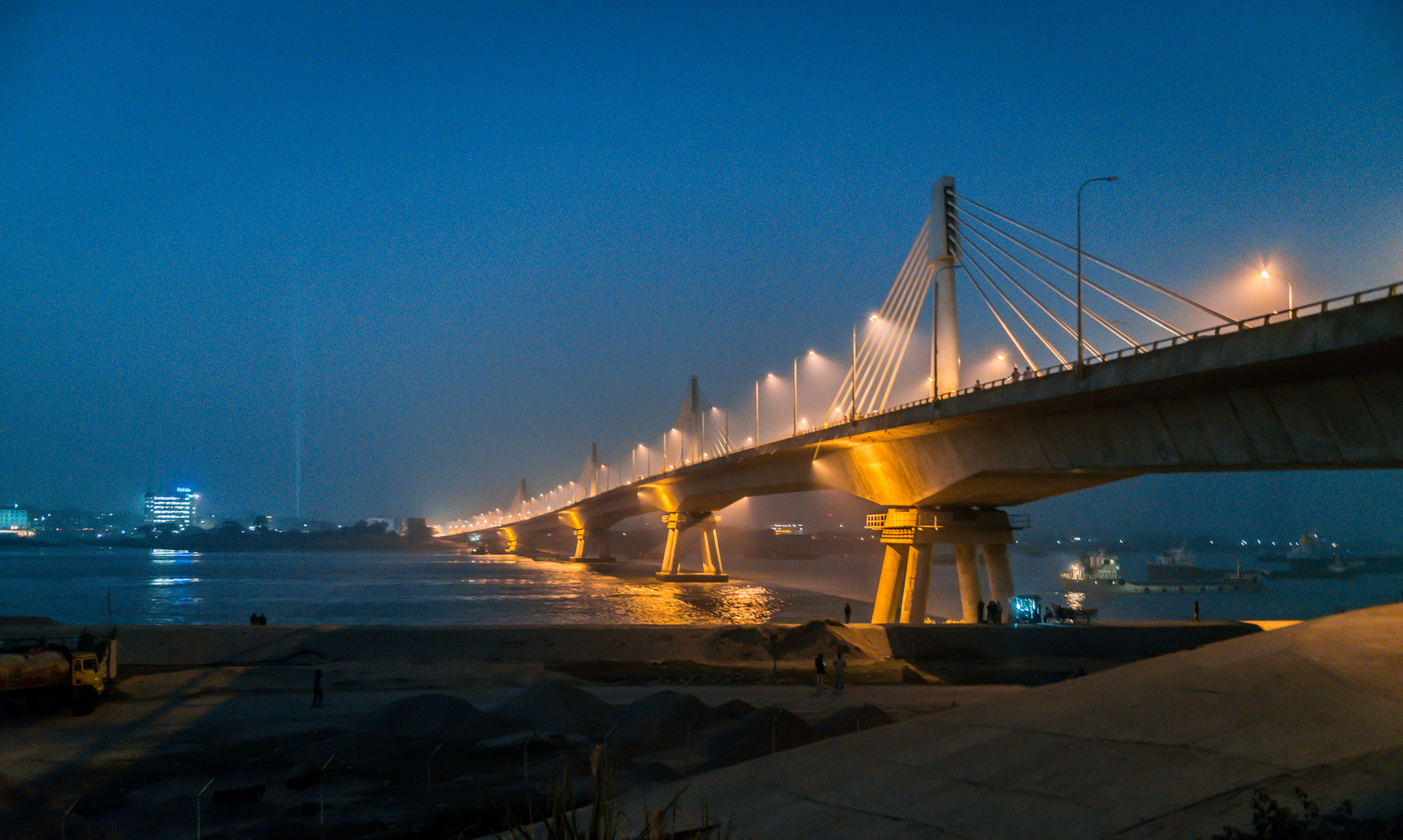
- Coordinates: 22.3253°N 91.8532°E
- Carries: National Highway 1
- Crosses: Karnaphuli River
- Locale: Karnaphuli, Chittagong, Bangladesh
- Other name: Natun (New) Bridge
- Named for: Karnaphuli River
- Owner: Government of Bangladesh
- Maintained by: Ministry of Road Transport and Bridges
- Preceded by: Second Karnaphuli Bridge

Characteristics
- Design: Extradosed bridge
- Material: Prestressed concrete
- Total length: 950 m (3,117 ft)
- Width: 24.47 m (80 ft)
- Traversable?: No
- Longest span: 200 m (656 ft)
- No. of spans: 3

History
- Designer: High-Point Rendel Limited
- Constructed by: China Major Bridge Construction
- Construction start: August 2006
- Construction end: July 2010
- Construction cost: 590 crore
- Opened: 8 September 2010; 15 years ago
- Replaces: Hazrat Shah Amanat Bridge

Location
- Interactive map of Shah Amanat Bridge; Third Karnaphuli Bridge

Shah Amanat Bridge, the second bridge constructed across the Karnaphuli River in Bangladesh, is the first major extradosed bridge in the country. It is located along the country's busiest national highway, N1. It connects the southern parts of Chittagong, Cox's Bazar, and the hilly district of Bandarban. It is named after Chittagong's 18th-century Islamic Saint Shah Amanat.

== Construction history ==
Construction of the bridge started in August 2006 and it was officially opened on 8 September 2010. The Chinese construction company Major Bridge Construction, China, built the bridge. The project involved a cost of Taka 590 crore, including a foreign exchange component of Taka 3.72 billion provided by the Kuwait Fund.

== Dimensions ==
The bridge is 950 m long and 24.47 m wide. It has five piers with three 200 m extradosed main spans, two 115 m side spans and a 130 m approach viaduct section. Alongside four lanes for vehicles, the bridge has two 1.5 m lanes for movement of 'manual transports' like rickshaws, push carts and vans. There is also a 1.5 m walkway on each side of the bridge. The bridge has a 0.5 km approach road in the city end and one km approach road at the Patiya end.

== Gallery ==
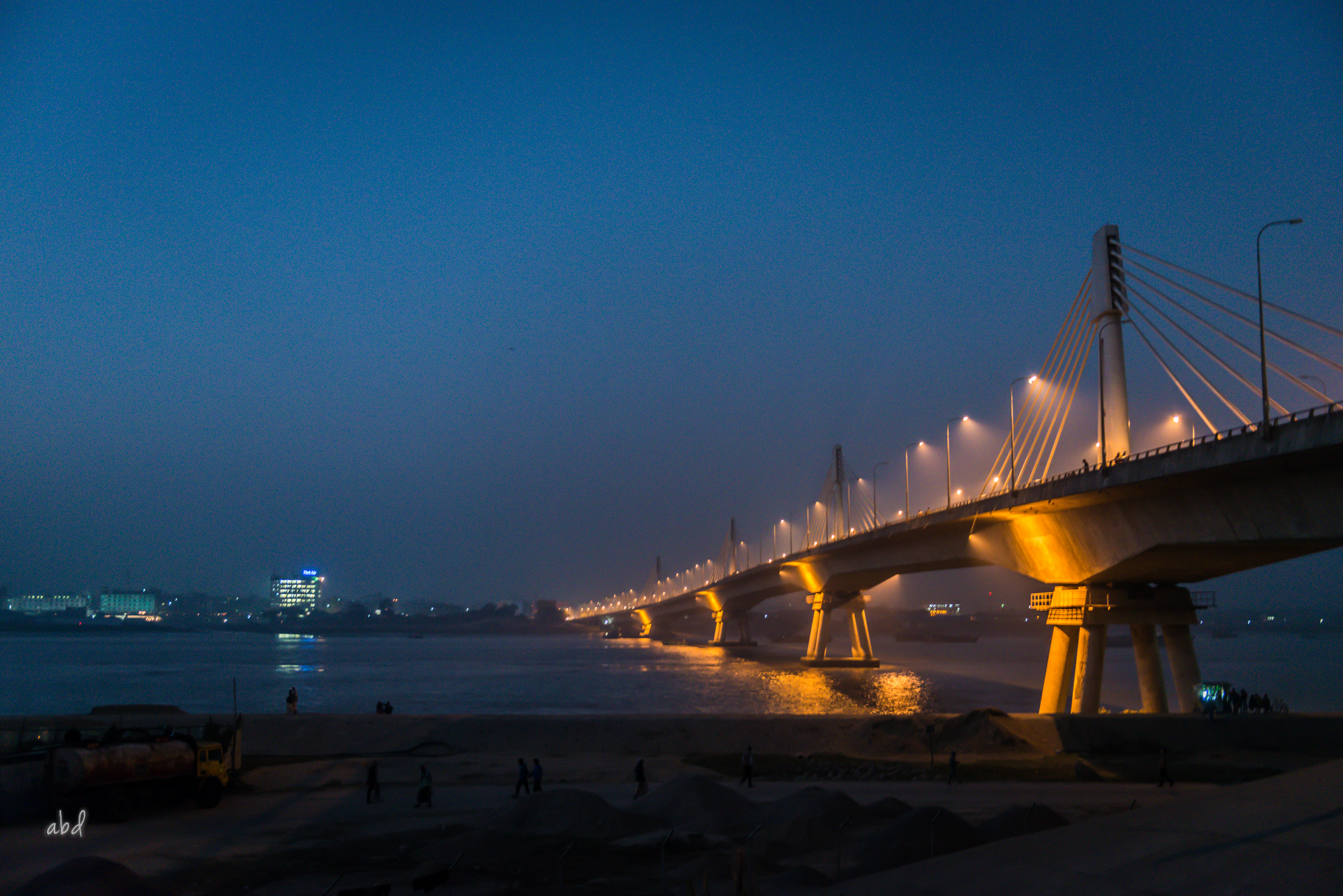

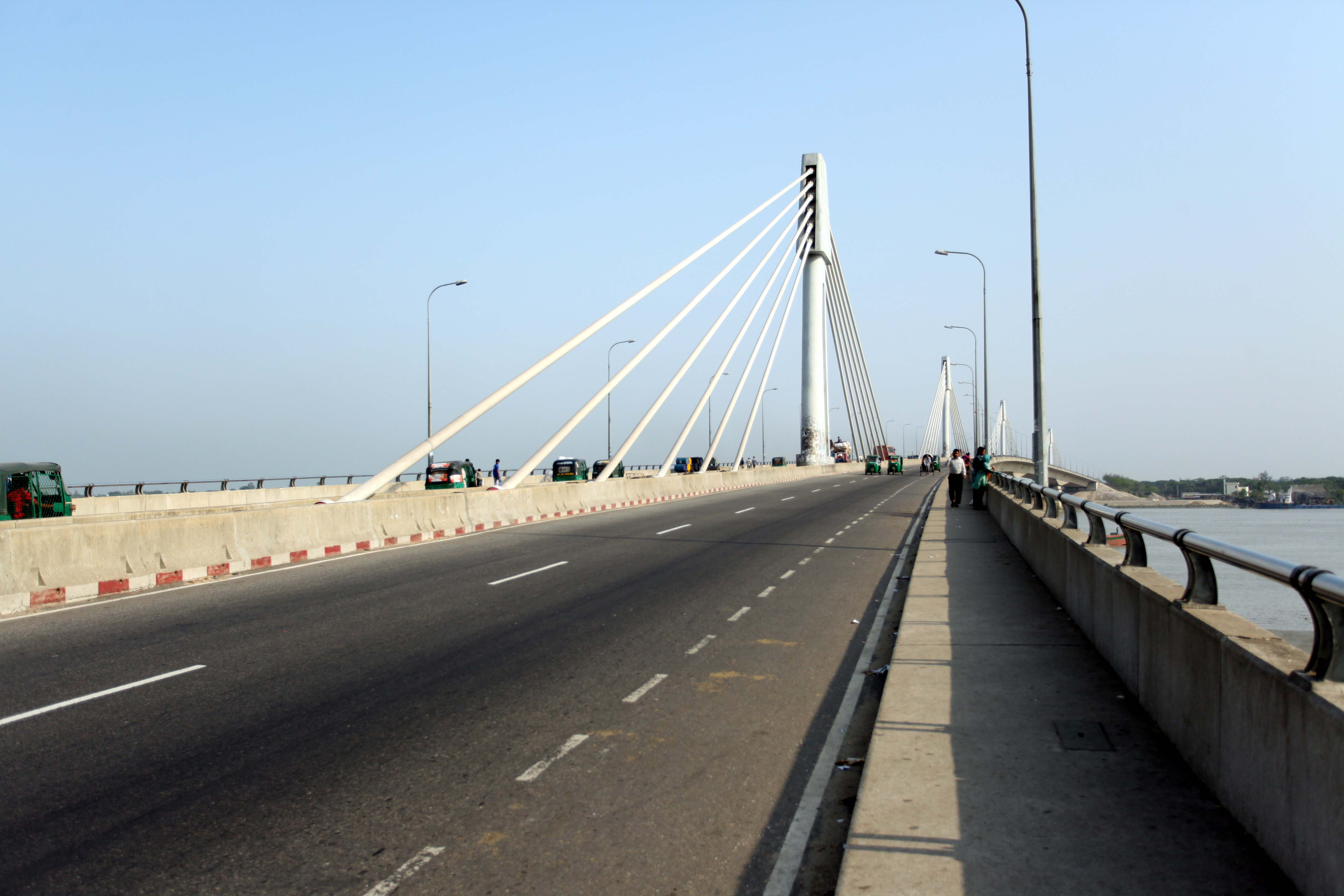

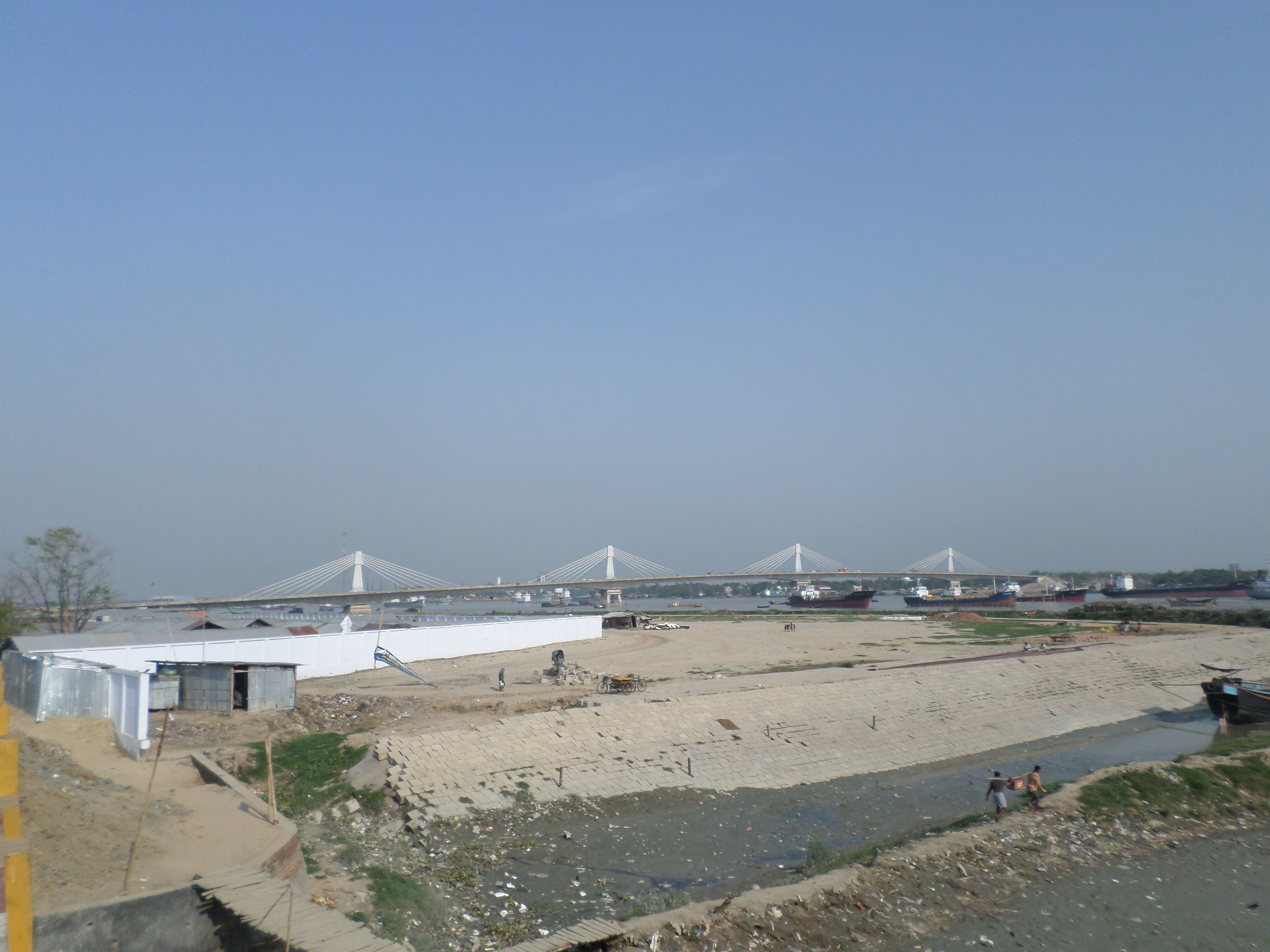

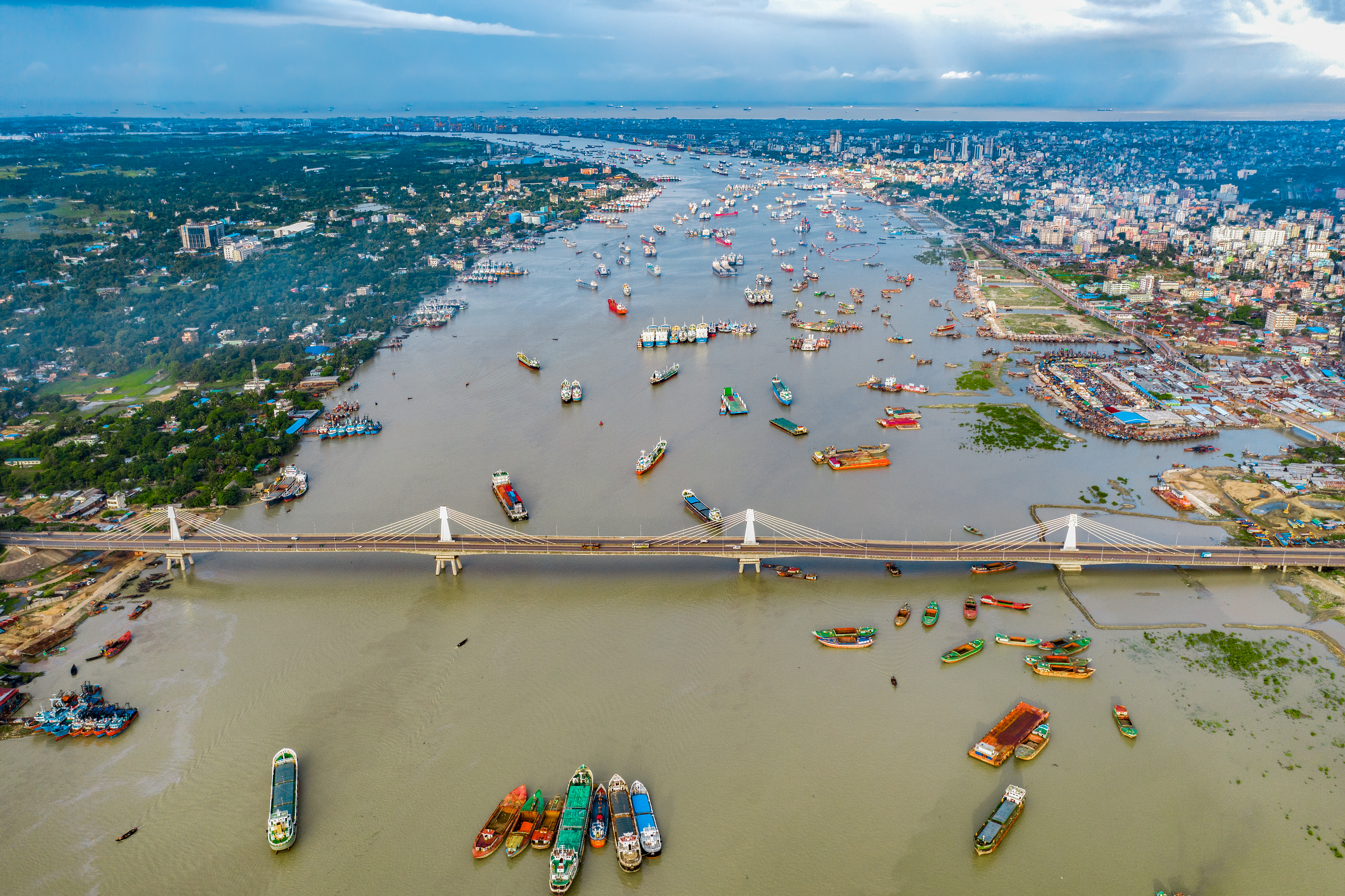
