= Azimpur Dayera Sharif Khanqah =

Khanquah in Dhaka, Bangladesh

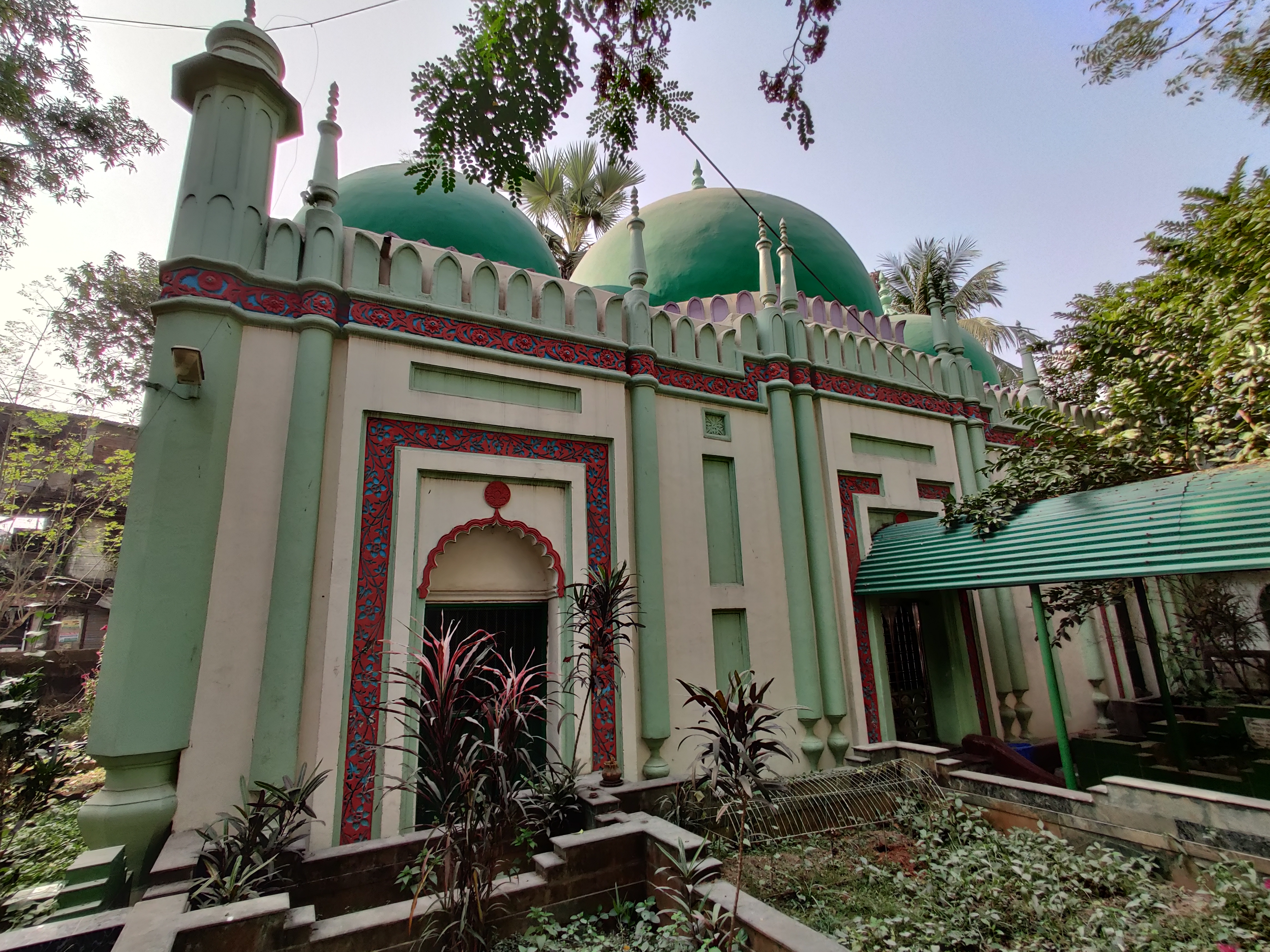
- Azimpur Dayera Sharif

- Location in Dhaka

Religion
- Affiliation: Sunni Islam
- Sect: Sufism
- Ecclesiastical or organizational status: Khanqah and mosque
- Status: Active

Location
- Location: Azimpur, Dhaka
- Country: Bangladesh
- Interactive map of Azimpur Dayera Sharif Khanqah
- Coordinates: 23°43′29.9″N 90°22′57.7″E

Architecture
- Style: Mughal architecture
- Founder: Sufi Mohammad Dayem Pak
- Completed: c. 1700s CE

Specifications
- Dome: Three
- Minaret: One
- List of Old Dhaka Heritage Sites

The Azimpur Dayera Sharif Khanqah, commonly known as the Bara Dayera Sharif, is the khanqah or historical Sufi shrine of Dayera Sharif Khanqah, situated in the Azimpur locality of Dhaka, in the Dhaka Division of Bangladesh. The complex includes a mausoleum and mosque.

The Persian word Dayera means "circle" or "work area". As a rule, the heirs of the Dayera Sharif never go outside the area, except for pilgrimage. The Azimpur Dayera Sharif was established by Shah Sufi Sayed Muhammad Dayem who came at Dhaka in 1766-68 CE. It is currently under the supervision of his seventh generation (tenth Gaddi-Nashin). Shah Sufi Syed Shah Ahmedullah Jubayer has been the overall supervisor of Dayera Sharif since 1998. The successor of the Sufi dynasty is known as Gaddi Nashin, who sits on the Gaddi to serve people.

The historical Azimpur Dayera Sharif represents the 700-year-old Sufi dynasty in Bengal. The representatives of the dynasty are one of the very few Persian-speaking people in Bangladesh. The place is also symbolic to the propagation of Islam not only in the province of Bengal but also across the greater Indian subcontinent.Endowment mark, stamp, and sign of Emperor Shah Jahan and the Quran gifted by Emperor Shah Jahan resembles a deep connection to the Sufi dynasty with the Mughal Empire.

== History ==
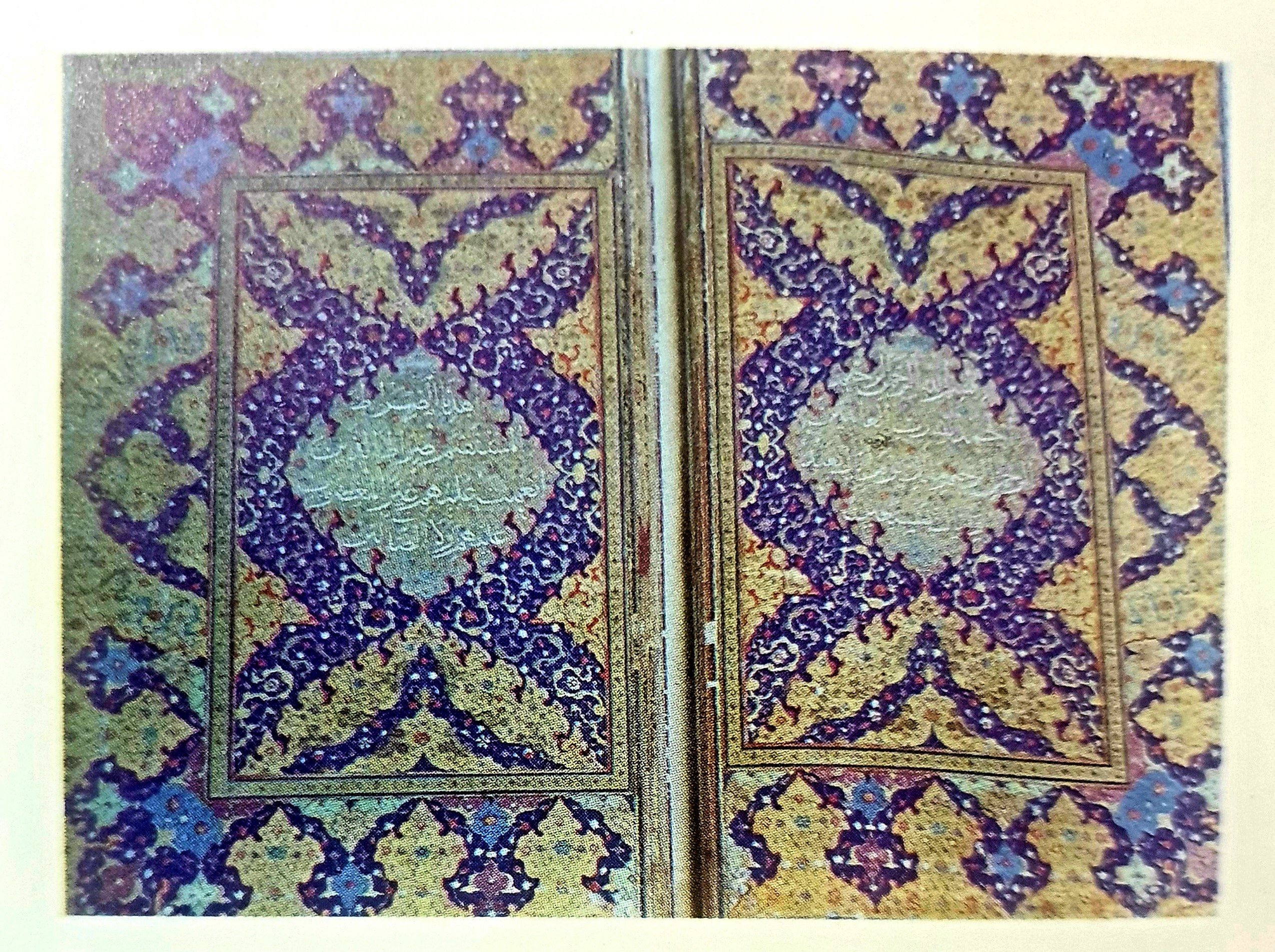
The Quran of 17th century preserved at Dayera Sharif

Bakhtiyar Mahiswar was a descendant the daughter of Muhammad, Fatimah. Two children were born in the womb of his wife who was a descendant of Abu Bakr Siddiq - Syed Jahan Shah and Syed Muhammad Haya Shah. Syed Haya Shah, the second son of Mohammad Bakhtiyar Mahi Swar, appeared in the lineage of Dayem, the founder of the Dayera Sharif.

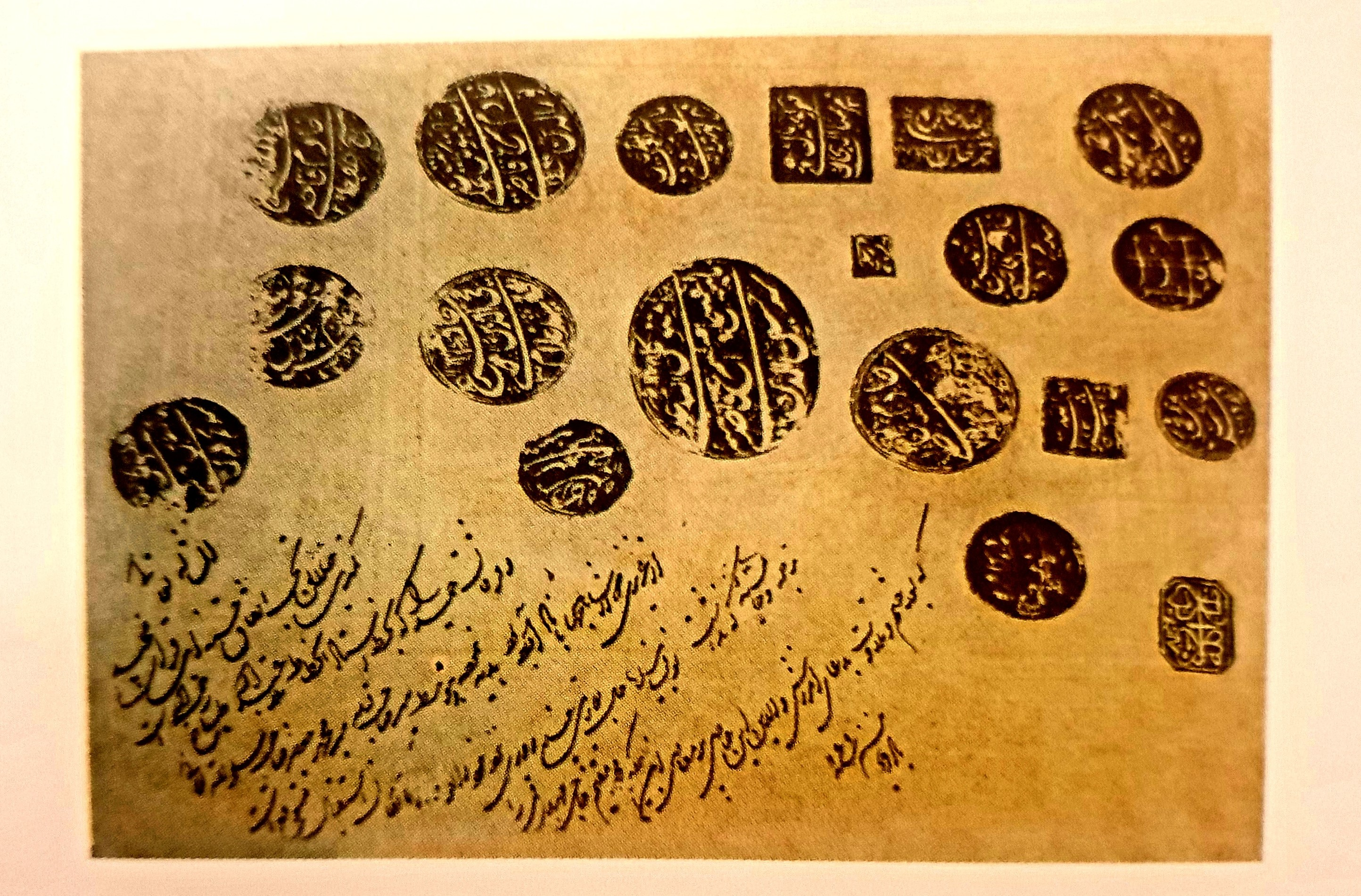
Endowment mark, stamp, and sign of Emperor Shah Jahan preserved at Dayera Sharif

Dayem, a disciple of Shah Amanat, is believed to have shown many miracles and divine activities. In the 18th century, his murshid asked him to follow four orders:

1. To stay in Dhaka city under siege (Dayera)
2. To put his trust in Allah in all matters and in all circumstances.
3. To take a spouse
4. To arrange feasts for the common and oppressed.

In response to this, he asked, "Where shall I stay in Dhaka?". Murshid ordered him to dive into the Laldighi, a lake of Chattogram; then engage himself in preaching Islam in the area where he would rise in Dhaka. Acting accordingly, he dived in and immediately floated in a pond in a crowded place of Azimpur in Dhaka. This is the place where the Dayera Sharif is situated at present.

== Architecture ==
The main mosque of the Dayera Sharif is a small rectangular building containing four octagonal corner towers, shooting high above the parapet and terminated by cupolas. The eastern wall of the mosque has three arched entrances, which are placed within half-dome. The interior of the mosque contains a single mihrab in the centre of the western wall. A dome, carried on squinches, covers the mosque's central space, which is placed over an octagonal drum. Two half-dome vaults have been made on either side of the central space to extend the inner space. The base of the drum is decorated by a row of merlon design. There were also some floral designs inside the mosque, signs of which are still found behind the whitewash.

The eastern side of the mosque was extended four times, and the original structure of the mosque is now only found from the west.

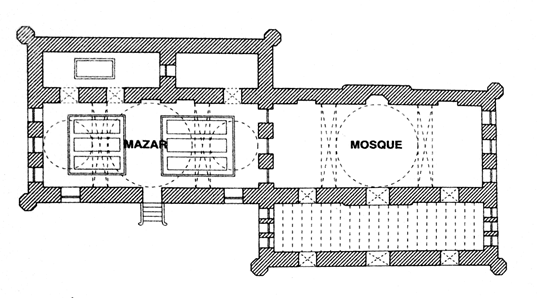
The Plan of Mosque and Mazar, Bara Dayera Sharif, Azimpur, Dhaka

The mosque was built by Shah Sufi Sayed Muhammad Dayem in 1769 CE. In 1776, it was rebuilt with permanent materials.

Shah Sufi Sayed Muhammad Dayem died in 1799 CE. He was buried on the southern side of the mosque. A three-domed building has been built over his grave. It is a rectangular structure, having four corner towers. This eastern wall has three arched entrances. Each doorway is placed within a projected wall, which is flanked by attached ferrets. Inside of the building, space is covered by three domes; the central dome is bigger than the others. The inner space contains other graves of the followers of Shah Sufi Muhammad Dayem. On the western side there is a verandah, probably extended in the later period.

The three-storied main gate of the Dayera Sharif was built in 1891 CE in Turkish architectural style under Nawab Ahsanullah. During the reign of Khalilullah, the first extension of the present wudu khana and mosque building was made of concrete. During this period, the Dayera Sharif and its periphery were officially included in the waqf state.

Shah Sufi Syed Khalilullah(R.a) built the minaret of the mosque in 1907 CE. At the same time the floor of the mosque was covered with marble stones. The domes of the Mazar Sharif were also built at that time.

== Gallery ==
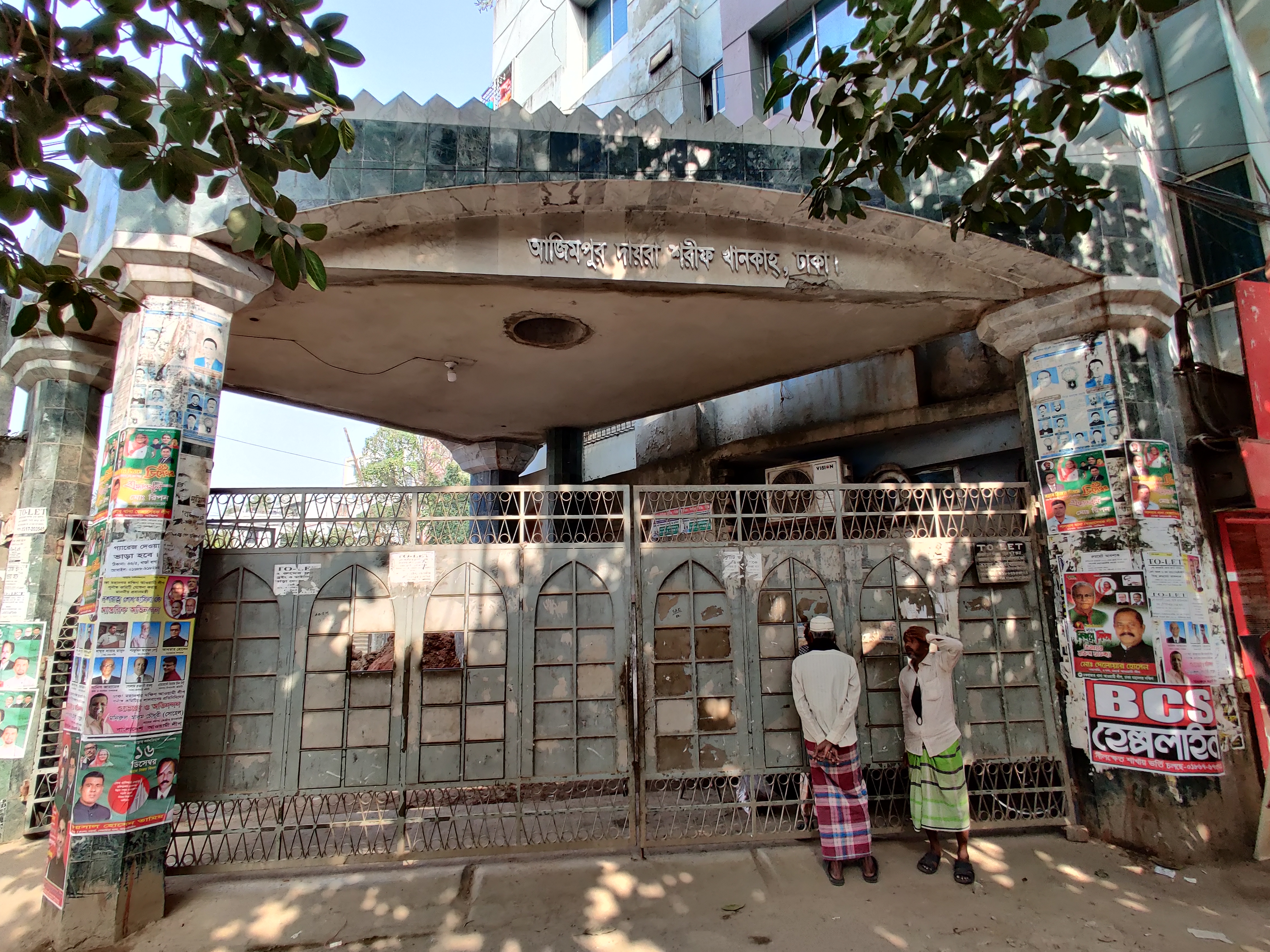
Main Gate of Azimpur Dayera Sharif

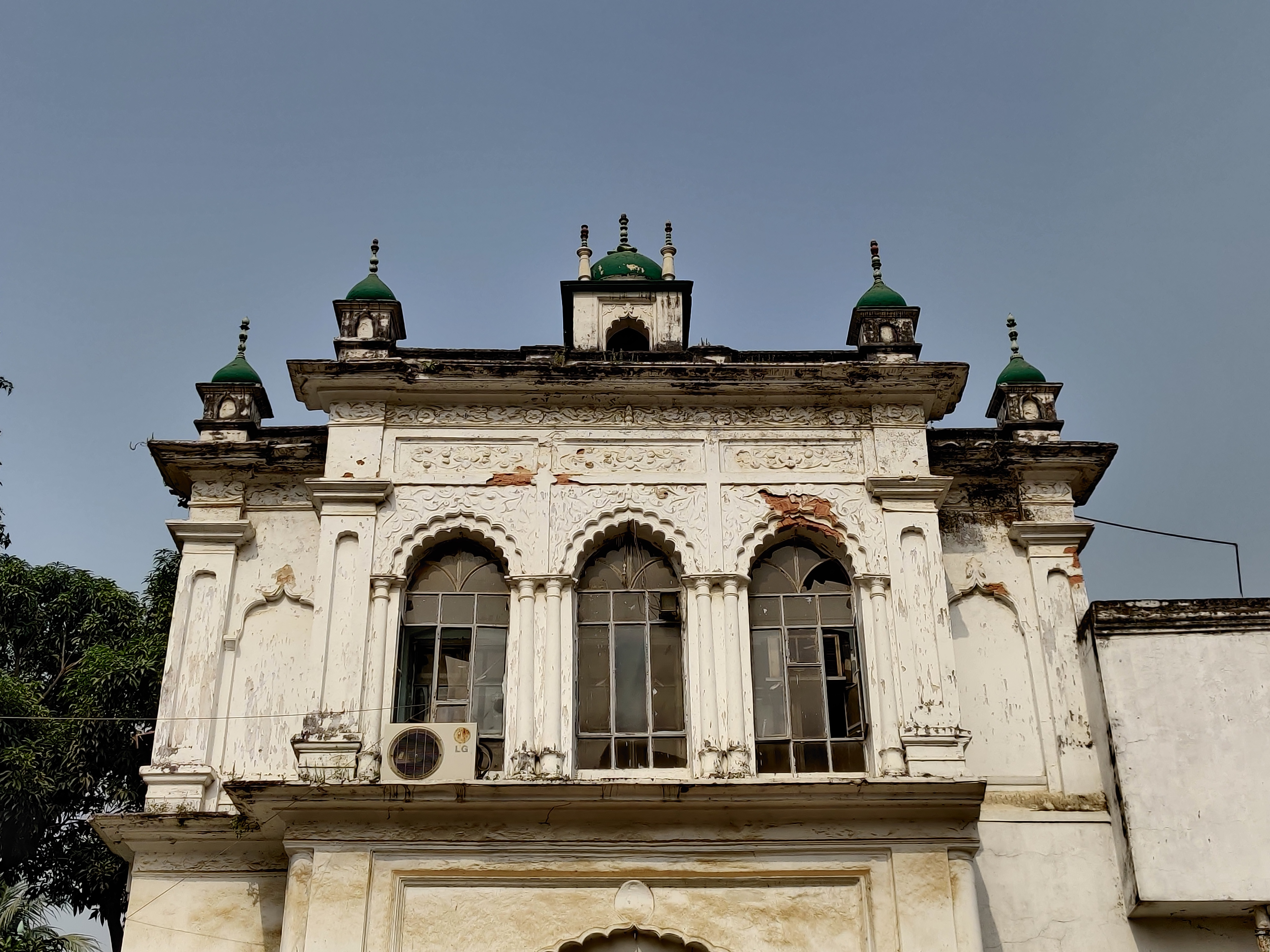
Azimpur Dayera Sharif entrance building

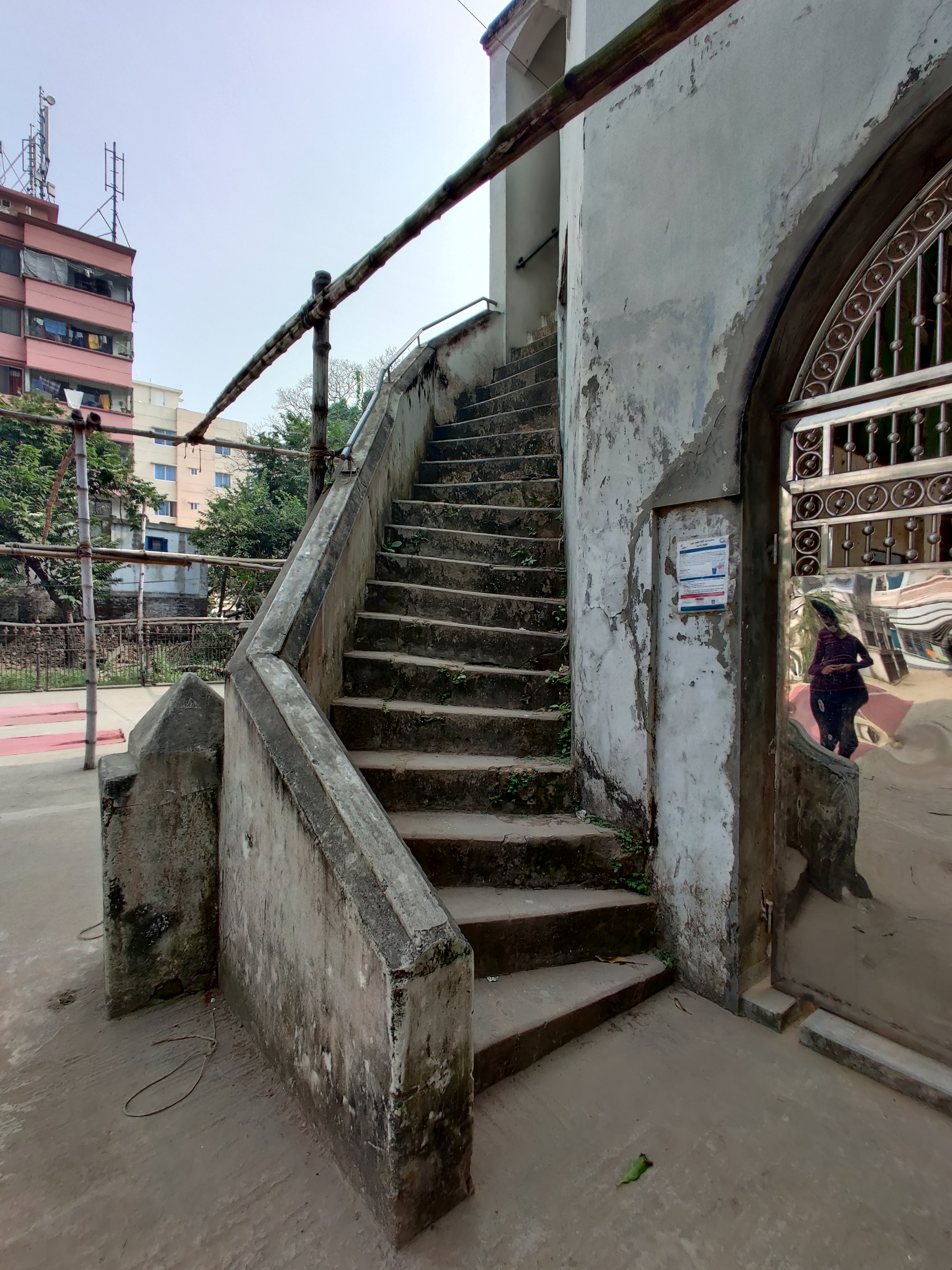
200 years old staircase at the entrance

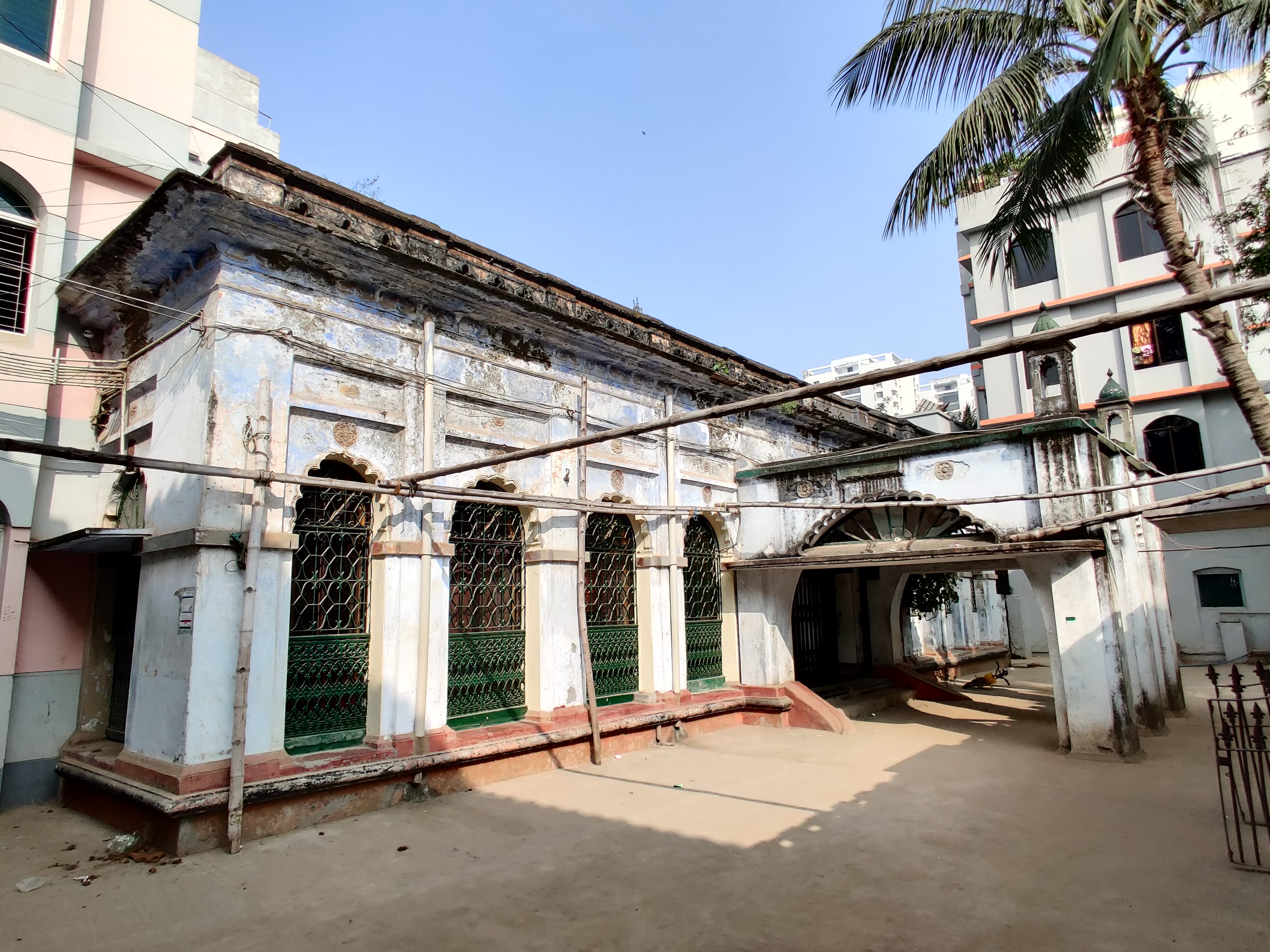
Darbar Sharif for meeting the supervisor and Gaddi Nashin of Azimpur Dayera Sharif

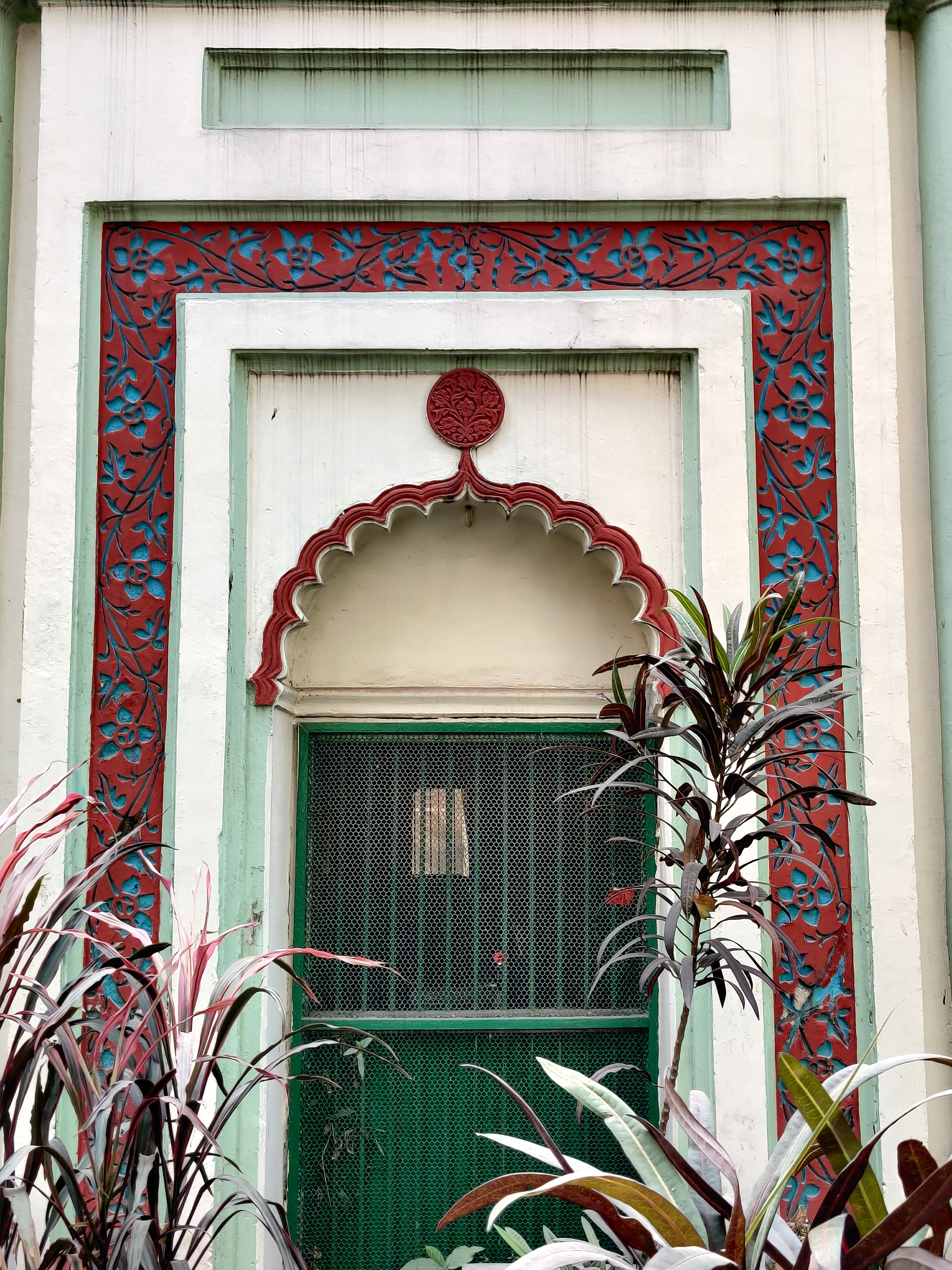
Artistically designed window inside Dayera Sharif

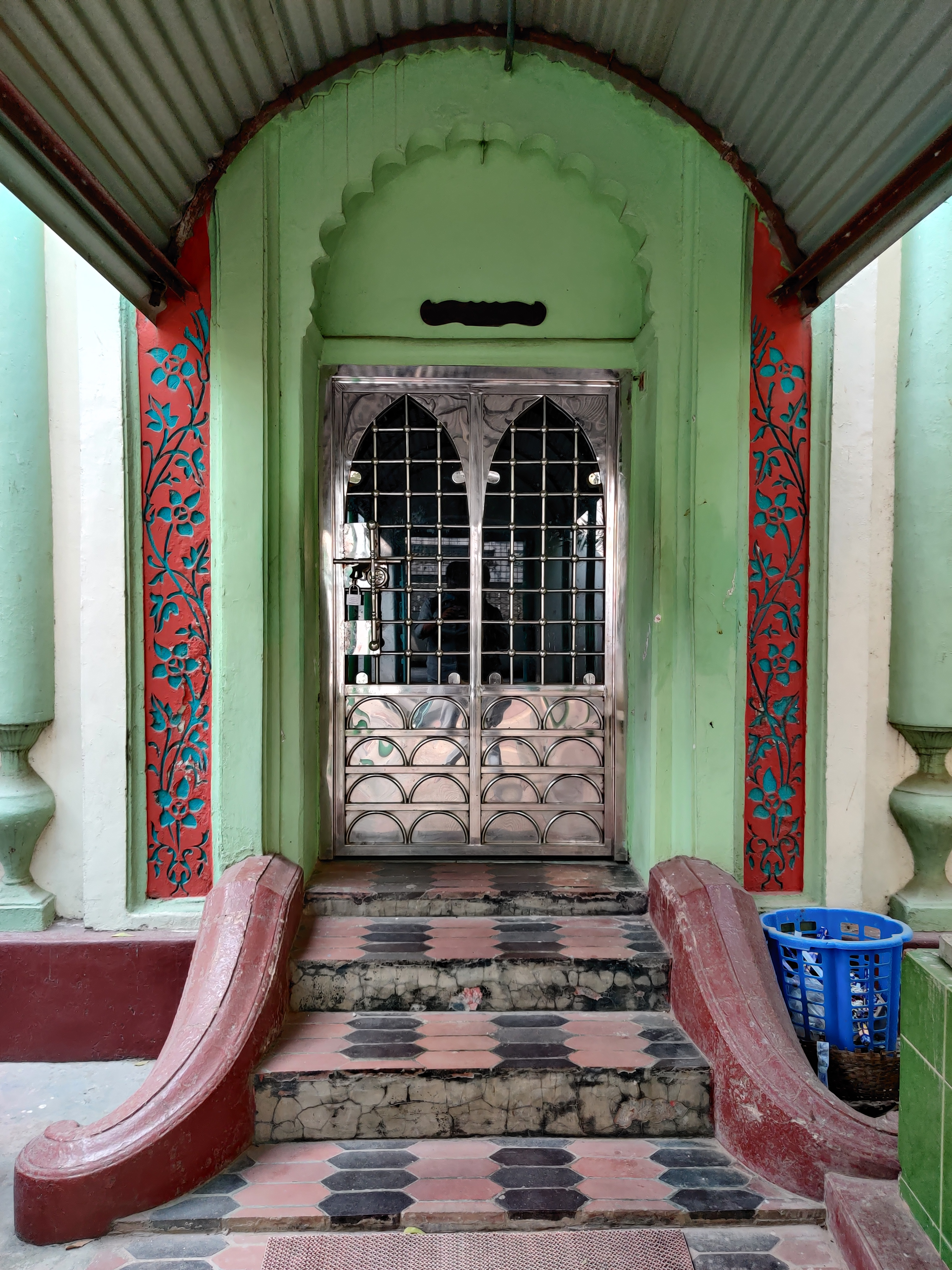
Arched way inside Azimpur Dayera Sharif

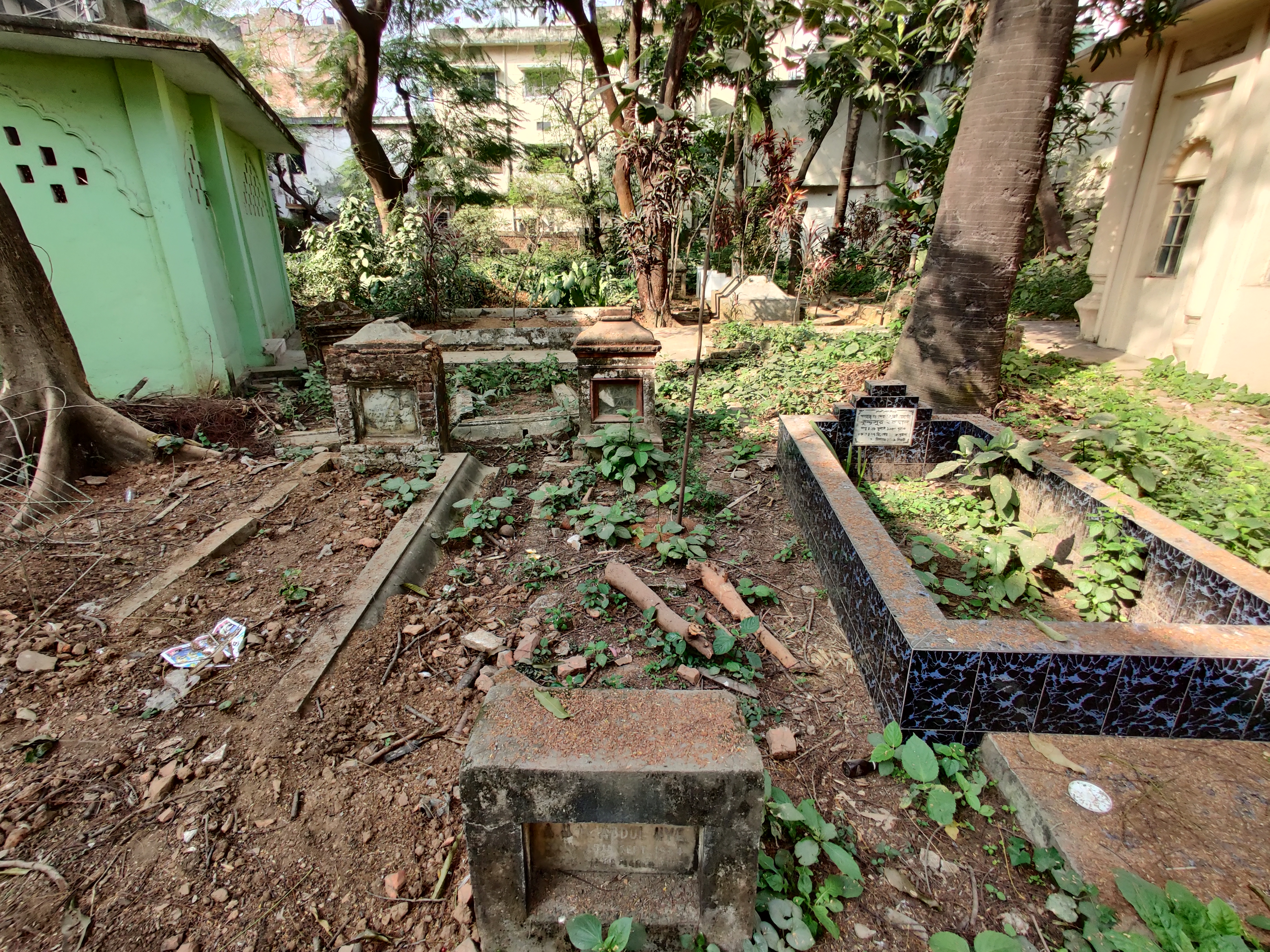
Graveyard inside Azimpur Dayera Sharif for past generations of Gaddi Nashins and their family members

== See also ==
- Islam in Bangladesh
- List of mosques in Bangladesh
- List of archaeological sites in Bangladesh
- List of Old Dhaka Heritage Sites
