= Muhammad Yasin Khan =

Faujdar of Islamabad (Chittagong)
- In office 1723–1727
- Monarch: Muhammad Shah
- Governor: Murshid Quli Khan
- Preceded by: Wali Beg Khan
- Succeeded by: Mirza Baqir

Muhammad Yasin Khan was a Faujdar of the Sarkar-e-Islamabad (Chittagong) in Mughal Bengal. He succeeded Wali Beg Khan, governing Chittagong under the first Nawab of Bengal Murshid Quli Khan and Mughal emperor Muhammad Shah. In the same year of his appointment, Khan commissioned the construction of the Qadam Mubarak Shahi Mosque in Chittagong. He served as the first mutawalli of the mosque and safeguarded within the compound two stone imprints, one of which is attributed to the Prophet Muhammad which Khan had acquired from his pilgrimage to Al-Madinah Al-Munawarrah. In 1727, he was succeeded as the Faujdar of Chittagong by Mirza Baqir.

== See also ==
- History of Chittagong

Political offices
Preceded by Wali Beg Khan	Faujdar of Islamabad (Chittagong); 1723-1727	Succeeded by Mirza Baqir
