= Mirai by Nirman =

High-rise building in Dhaka, Bangladesh

- মীরাই বায় নির্মাণ

General information
- Status: Under construction
- Location: Hatirjheel, Tejgaon I/A, Dhaka, 240, Tejgaon Commercial Area, Dhaka 1208, Dhaka, Bangladesh
- Construction stopped: summer 2027

Height
- Height: 138 metres

Technical details
- Floor count: 30
- Floor area: 11,600 sq. ft. per floor on avg.

Design and construction
- Architecture firm: ARCO

Other information
- Parking: 5 underground levels of parking

Website
- nirmaninternational.com

Mirai by Nirman is a 138 m (453 ft) 30-storey commercial high-rise building under construction in Dhaka, Bangladesh. The building is located in Tejgaon Industrial Area, adjacent to Hatirjheel Lake and is being developed by Dhaka-based Bangladeshi real estate firm Nirman International. Slated for completion in the summer of 2027, Mirai is expected to be among the tallest buildings in the city. Finnish architecture firm ARCO has designed the high-rise. The tower block is LEED Gold certified and will utilise a double-glazed facade for efficiency. It is being constructed using the building information modelling method.

== Naming ==
The name "Mirai" (Japanese: 未来, romanized: mirai, lit. 'future') is the Japanese word for future, and according to The Business Standard, the tower block "aims to bring the industry into the future with its futuristic design, technological innovation and aesthetics."

== See also ==
- List of tallest buildings in Bangladesh
- List of tallest buildings in Dhaka
- Shanta Pinnacle
- City Centre Dhaka
- Dhaka Tower
- MGI Tower
- Bangladesh Bank Building
- Bangladesh Shilpa Bank Bhaban
