= List of tallest buildings in Dhaka =

Dhaka, the capital of Bangladesh has over 800 high-rise buildings. The list below indicates the tallest buildings in Dhaka ranking from highest to lowest based on official heights. Currently, PINNACLE is the city's tallest building, with a height of 152.4 metres (500 ft).

As of mid-October 2026, Dhaka has 15-17 buildings rising at least 100 m (328 ft) in height.

== Tallest buildings ==
This list ranks buildings in Dhaka based on official height; unofficial or estimated height is included as reference(s). Buildings are ranked by architectural height; in cases of equal height, the building with more floors is listed first. All the buildings listed below are either completed or topped-out and rise at least 64 m (210 ft) from the ground.

Was Dhaka's tallest building upon completion.
Topped out & under construction.
Topped out, but construction has been halted indefinitely.

Rank	Name	Image	Height m (ft)	Floors	Area	Year	Use	Notes	Reference(s)
1	Shanta Pinnacle		152.4 m (500 ft)	40	Tejgaon I/A	2026	Commercial	First 40-storey skyscraper in both Dhaka & Bangladesh, as well as the largest skyscraper by GFA. It's the first skyscraper in South Asia to receive USGBC LEED v4 Platinum Certification under the Core and Shell rating system. Since its completion, it has been South Asia’s greenest skyscraper.	
	Hilton Dhaka		145–152.4 m (476–500 ft) (Note: According to the earliest available informations, Hilton Dhaka was supposed to be 152–152.4 m (499–500 ft) tall. Although, the author of this video claimed it to be approx. 145 m (476 ft) tall. @CityScraper. "Top 10 Tallest Buildings of Dhaka". YouTube.)	34	Gulshan 1	N/A	Hotel	Once completed, it'll be the tallest hotel in Bangladesh.	
2	City Centre Dhaka		118 m (387 ft) (Note: Widely misreported as 171 m (561 ft) before. Later, claimed to be 118 m (387 ft) tall. But City Centre Dhaka is considered well above 118 metres by many people. Unofficial estimates claim it to be at least 140 m (459 ft) tall.)	37	Motijheel	2012	Commercial	Formerly the tallest building, widely misreported as 171 m (561 ft).	
3	Innstar Trade Intercontinental		N/A (Note: There's no official height. But in this video, the author claimed it to be approx. 132 m (433 ft) tall. @CityScraper. "Top 10 Tallest Buildings of Dhaka". YouTube.)	32	Tejgaon I/A	2024	Commercial	USGBC LEED Platinum Pre-certified Green Skyscraper.	
4	Suvastu Skyline Avenue		N/A (Note: There's no official height. Although, Suvastu Skyline Avenue's approximate height will be around 120–128 m (394–420 ft) tall. But in this video, the author claimed it to be approx. 122 m (400 ft) tall. @CityScraper. "Top 10 Tallest Buildings of Dhaka". YouTube.)	32	Gulshan 1	2026	Commercial	Tallest skyscraper in Gulshan 1.	
5	Bangladesh Bank Building		115 m (377 ft)/ 137.16 m (450 ft)	31	Motijheel	1985	Commercial	It was the second-tallest building in South Asia upon completion.	
6	Sheraton Dhaka		121 m (397 ft)	29	Banani	2018	Hotel	Also known as Banani DCC-Unique Complex. It's the tallest skyscraper in Banani, as well as the tallest hotel of Dhaka.	
7	The Westin Dhaka		120 m (394 ft)	26 (Note: Officially, The Westin Dhaka has 24 floors. But unofficially, it has 26/ 29 floors.)	Gulshan 2	2006	Hotel	It's the tallest completed skyscraper in Gulshan 2, as well as the second-tallest hotel of Dhaka, right after Sheraton Dhaka.	
8	Doreen Tower		112 m (367 ft)	26	Gulshan 2	2013	Mixed-use	(Four Points by Sheraton)	
	Unique Acropolis		N/A (Note: There's no official height. Unofficially, it'll be approx. 110 m (361 ft) tall.)	27	Gulshan 2	N/A	Hotel	It's a concern of Borak Real Estates Ltd.	
9	Ahmed Tower		108.8 m (357 ft)	27	Banani	2017	Commercial	Second-tallest building in Banani.	
10	Bangladesh Shipping Corporation (BSC) Tower		N/A (Note: There's no official height. But in this video, the author claimed it to be approx. 107 m (351 ft) tall. @CityScraper. "Top 10 Tallest Buildings of Dhaka". YouTube.)	28	Motijheel	2017	Commercial	It has a GFA of 11,984.5 m^{2} (129,000 sq ft).	
11	Concord MBR Skyline*		106.67 m (350 ft)	26	Gulshan 1	2026	Commercial	A concern of Concord Real Estate Ltd.	
12	Simpletree GSR		N/A (Note: There's no official height. Although, Simpletree GSR's approximate height will be around 110 m (361 ft) tall. But in this video, the author claimed it to be approx. 100 m (328 ft) tall. @CityScraper. "How Gulshan is Changing Dhaka's Skyline". YouTube.)	25	Gulshan 2	2024	Commercial	USGBC LEED Gold-certified Skyscraper. Huawei's South Asia HQ is located in the building.	
13	Lily Pond Center		N/A (Note: There's no official height. Although, Lily Pond Center's approximate height will be around 100–112 m (328–367 ft).)	25	Motijheel	2019	Mixed-use		
14	Standard Bank HQ		N/A (Note: There's no official height. But in this video, the author claimed it to be approx. 100 m (328 ft) tall with 26 floors. @CityScraper. "How Gulshan is Changing Dhaka's Skyline". YouTube.)	26	Gulshan 1	2024	Commercial	Tallest HQ among the private banks in Bangladesh since 2024.	
15	Shanta Forum		105 m (344 ft)	25	Tejgaon I/A	2022	Commercial	First twin tower in Bangladesh with skybridge.	
16	IDLC Finance HQ*		N/A	26	Tejgaon I/A	N/A	Commercial		
17	Islam Assure Center		N/A	24	Mohakhali	2026	Commercial		
18	Janata Bank Bhaban		96.7 m (317 ft)	24	Motijheel	1985	Commercial		
19	Srom Bhaban Dhaka		96 m (315 ft)	22	Bijoynagar	2019	Government		
20	Gulshan Centre Point		94 m (308 ft)	23	Gulshan 2	2024	Commercial		
21	Confidence Tower		94 m (308 ft)	20	Shahjadpur	2013	Commercial	Reportedly the tallest building in Badda.	
22	Simpletree Attalika		N/A	20	Gulshan 2	2024	Commercial	USGBC LEED Gold-certified High-rise.	
23	Renaissance Dhaka Gulshan Hotel		90–95 m (295–312 ft)	19	Gulshan 1	2019	Hotel		
24	Navana Tower		92 m (302 ft)	23	Gulshan 1	2002	Commercial		
24	Uday Tower		92 m (302 ft)	23	Gulshan 1	2013	Commercial		
24	SKA Tower		92 m (302 ft)	23 (Note: Depending on the sources, it has 21-23 floors. Officially, it's known as a 23 storey building.)	Banani	2018	Commercial	Also known as Sayeed Khokon Autograph Tower; it's a concern of Sayeed Khokon Properties Ltd.	
24	Suvastu Muskan Tower		92 m (302 ft)	23	Gulshan 1	2023	Commercial		
24	Rupayan Centre		92 m (302 ft)	23	Mohakhali		Commercial		
25	Twin Tower Concord		92 m (302 ft)	22	Shantinagar		Mixed-use		
25	Gazi Bhaban		92 m (302 ft)	22	Motijheel	N/A	Commercial		
26	IDB Bhaban	IDB Bhaban, Dhaka.	92 m (302 ft)	20	Agargaon	1987	Commercial		
27	MG SAM Center		91.44 m (300 ft)	19	Mohakhali	2022	Commercial		
28	Sun Moon Star Tower		N/A	30	Motijheel	2019	Mixed-use		
29	Paltan China Town Shopping Complex		89 m (292 ft)	22	Paltan	2020	Commercial		
29	Sky View Park City		89 m (292 ft)	22	Shantinagar	2008	Residential		
30	NCC Bank Bhaban		89 m (292 ft)	20	Motijheel	2014	Commercial		
30	Peoples Insurance Bhaban		89 m (292 ft)	20	Motijheel	2005	Commercial		
30	Rahmaniya International Complex		89 m (292 ft)	20	Motijheel		Mixed-use		
30	Gause Pak AB Tower		89 m (292 ft)	20	Motijheel		Mixed-use		
30	Eastern Bailey Apartment		89 m (292 ft)	20	Baily Road		Residential		
31	Rupayan Trade Center		89 m (292 ft)	18	Banglamotors		Commercial		
31	Nafi Tower		89 m (292 ft)	18	Gulshan 1		Commercial		
32	Awal Centre		88 m (289 ft)	23	Banani		Commercial		
32	FR Tower		88 m (289 ft)	23	Banani		Commercial	One of the most notorious fire incidents involving a high-rise building in Bangladesh. Currently, the building is partially operational.	
33	Bangladesh Development Bank Limited (BDBL) Bhaban		88 m (289 ft) (Note: 90 m (295 ft) is included in many sources.)	21	Motijheel	1983	Commercial	Prior 2009, it was known as Bangladesh Shilpa Bank Bhaban.	
34	Sena Kalyan Bhaban		87 m (285 ft)	21	Motijheel	1990	Commercial		
34	BCIC Building		87 m (285 ft)	21	Motijheel	1987	Commercial		
35	Concord Grand		86 m (282 ft)	20	Shantinagar	2005	Mixed-use		
36	Bashundhara City		85 m (279 ft)	19	Panthapath	2004	Commercial	Upon completion, it was the second-largest shopping mall in South Asia.	
37	Finance Square		N/A	22	Gulshan 2		Commercial		
37	Tropical Metro Centre*		N/A	22	Motijheel	2026	Commercial		
38	Eunoos Trade Center		85 m (279 ft)	21	Motijheel	2004	Commercial		
38	Baitul View Tower		85 m (279 ft)	21	Motijheel	2010	Commercial		
39	Bangabandhu Sheikh Mujib Academic and Administrative Building*		N/A	20	Savar		Government	It's the main academic & administrative building of BPATC, as well as the tallest building in Savar.	
40	Cabinet Division New 20 Storey Building, Bangladesh Secretariat		N/A	20	Shegunbagicha	2024	Government	Main building of the Cabinet Division in Bangladesh Secretariat.	
41	Q Hotel Dhaka*		N/A (Note: There's no official height. But compared to Dhaka Eye, which is 91.44 m (300 ft) tall, Q Hotel Dhaka will be over 80 m (262 ft).)	20	Purbachal Sector 1	2026	Mixed-use		
42	Bangladesh Police HQ		N/A (Note: Bangladesh Police HQ is 69 m (226 ft) tall, which is widely known. But, height of this building varies, depending on the sources. 69 m (226 ft) is highly questionable according to various sources.)	20	Gulistan		Government		
43	Borak Zahir Tower		85 m (279 ft)	20	Panthapath	2019	Commercial		
43	Unique Heights		85 m (279 ft)	20	Paribagh	2012	Commercial		
44	Britannia Moonlight Tower		N/A	21	Gulshan 1	2020	Commercial		
45	Rangs Z Square		N/A	19	Gulshan 2	2024	Commercial		
46	Biswas Tower		85 m (279 ft)	19	Motijheel	N/A	Residential		
47	Suvastu Nazar Valley		85 m (279 ft)	17	Shahjadpur	2005	Mixed-use		
48	The Pearl Trade Center		85 m (279 ft)	15 (Note: Officially, The Pearl Trade Center has 15-16 floors. According to various sources, the building is reported to have 21 floors, which is highly questionable.)	Shahjadpur	2017 (Note: Completion year disputed; sources report either 2015 or 2017.)	Commercial		
49	Jiban Bima Tower		84.62 m (278 ft)	21	Motijheel	1980	Commercial		
50	অর্থ বিভাগ, অর্থ মন্ত্রণালয়, Bangladesh Secretariat Building No. 11		N/A	20	Shegunbagicha	2023	Government	Main building of the Finance Division & Ministry of Finance in Bangladesh Secretariat.	
51	Anabil Tower		N/A	19	Gulshan 2		Commercial		
52	Jabbar Tower		81 m (266 ft)	22	Gulshan 1	2006	Commercial		
52	Red Crescent Borak Tower		81 m (266 ft)	22	Old Elephant Road	2013	Mixed-use		
53	Tower Of Aakash		N/A	21	Gulshan 1	2024	Commercial		
54	Hotel Sarina		81 m (266 ft)	21	Banani	2003	Hotel		
54	Holiday Inn Dhaka City Centre		81 m (266 ft)	21	Tejgaon I/A		Hotel		
54	Bulu Ocean Tower		81 m (266 ft)	21	Banani		Commercial		
54	Rupayan Shelford		81 m (266 ft)	21	Sher-e-Bangla Nagar	2016	Commercial		
54	BRAC Centre		81 m (266 ft)	21	Mohakhali	1995	Commercial		
54	Rupayan Lotus		81 m (266 ft)	21	Segunbagicha		Residential		
55	Hosaf Skyline*		81 m (266 ft) (est.)	20	Mohakhali	N/A	Commercial		
56	Borak Mehnur		81 m (266 ft)	20	Banani	2017	Commercial		
56	Red Crescent Concord Tower		81 m (266 ft)	20	Mohakhali	N/A	Commercial		
56	Unique Trade Centre (UTC)		81 m (266 ft)	20	Panthapath	2002	Commercial		
56	Karnaphuli Garden City		81 m (266 ft)	20	Kakrail	1998	Mixed-use	The building comprises a shopping mall on the ground through third floors, a rooftop garden on the fourth floor, and residential floors from the fifth through nineteenth floors.	
56	Planners Tower		81 m (266 ft)	20	Banglamotors	N/A	Commercial		
56	Sanmar Tower 2		81 m (266 ft)	20	Gulshan 2	2018	Commercial		
56	Paltan Tower		81 m (266 ft)	20	Paltan	2013	Mixed-use		
56	Grameen Bank Building		81 m (266 ft)	20	Mirpur 2	1983	Commercial		
56	Razia Tower		81 m (266 ft)	20		2008	Commercial		
56	Sukonna Tower		81 m (266 ft)	20	Katabon, New Market	2003	Mixed-use		
56	Marium Tower		81 m (266 ft)	20	Shahjadpur	N/A	Residential		
56	Concord Regency		81 m (266 ft)	20	Panthapath	2003	Mixed-use		
56	Bangladesh Secretariat Building No. 6		81 m (266 ft)	20	Shegunbagicha	2021	Government		
56	Sheltech Rahman Villa		81 m (266 ft)	20	Shantinagar	2012	Residential		
56	Shegunbagicha Concord		81 m (266 ft)	20	Shegunbagicha	2003	Residential		
56	Rupayan Z.A. Tower		81 m (266 ft)	20	Shantinagar	2007	Residential		
57	BRAC University Old Campus Tower		N/A (Note: Officially 64 m (210 ft) tall. Realistically, it'll be around or over 80 m (262 ft).)	20	Mohakhali	2001	Educational	Reportedly the tallest educational institute building in Bangladesh.	
58	Navana Circular Height		81 m (266 ft)	19	Shahjahanpur	N/A	Mixed-use		
59	MMK Aakash Avenue		N/A	18	Gulshan 2		Commercial		
60	Rupayan Taj		81 m (266 ft)	17	Naya Paltan	2012	Mixed-use		
61	Bicharpati Bhaban		N/A (Note: There's no trustworthy official height. Different sources claim it to be 95–101 m (312–331 ft) tall, which is clearly wrong. Realistically, Bicharpati Bhaban will be around or over 77 m (253 ft).)	20	Kakrail	2017	Residential	Reportedly the tallest residential building in Dhaka, Bangladesh.	
62	Shatabdi Centre		77 m (253 ft)	20	Motijheel		Mixed-use		
62	Fareast Islami Life Tower		77 m (253 ft)	20	Paltan		Commercial		
63	Nitol-Niloy Tower		N/A	18	Mohakhali		Commercial		
64	Officer's Tower DU		N/A	20	Ramna		Residential		
64	Bangabandhu Tower DU		N/A	20	Ramna		Residential		

== Under construction ==
This list consists of skyscrapers that are under-construction or approved in Dhaka City. Most of them are located in Tejgaon Commercial Area which is rising to be the next Central Business District in Dhaka City. Projects with a height of 100 metres (328 ft) or above are included.

Sr	Name	Height m (ft)	Floors	Year	Notes
1-2	Jolshiri Twin Towers	250 metres (820 ft)	65	N/A	In early stages.
2	Tropical TA Tower	152.4 metres (500 ft)	45	2029	Actively under construction.
3	SKS Sky Reach	152.4 metres (500 ft)	41	N/A	Constructed by Sena Kalyan Constructions and Developments, the building is under construction.
4	MGI Tower	152.4 metres (500 ft)	39	2029	Actively under construction.
5	Dhaka Tower	152.4 metres (500 ft)	38	2028	Designed by OMA, located in Tejgaon Industrial Area. Shanta Holdings is behind the development. Upon completion, Dhaka Tower will be the largest skyscraper by GFA in Dhaka, Bangladesh. By GFA, it'll be one of the largest single skyscrapers in South Asia.
6	The Prism	N/A	37	N/A	
7	Shanta Vista	N/A	36	N/A	
8	Shanta Zenith	N/A	35	N/A	
9	Emnipur Tower	N/A	35	N/A	
10	Tropical Hannan Tower	N/A	34	N/A	It'll be located at Arambagh, Motijheel.
11	Mirai by Nirman	138 metres (453 ft)	30	2027	
12	NH Tower	134 metres (440 ft)	32	2028	Constructed by Nexteon Developments, the high-rise will be located in Tejgaon Industrial Area."NH Tower in Tejgaon".
13	St. Regis	N/A	30	N/A	It'll be one of the tallest hotels in Bangladesh. Situated right beside The Westin Dhaka in Gulshan 2.
14	Ventura Milestone	N/A	31	2027	Broken the ground already, under-construction opposite to Shanta Western Tower in Tejgaon I/A.
15	Eureka Tower	120 metres (394 ft)	30	2026	Will be the second-tallest skyscraper of Gulshan 1 upon completion.
16	Suvastu Nibash Tower	N/A	30	2022	
17	KS Tower	N/A	28	N/A	A concern of Diganta Sweaters Ltd. It'll be one of the tallest buildings in Gulshan 1.
18	Emerald Heights	N/A	28	N/A	Developed by Samsuddin Real Estate Ltd. in Shantinagar.
19	Pubali Bank new HQ	N/A	27	N/A	Initially planned as a Swissotel, purchased by Pubali Bank, from Bengal Group of Industries, to use it as its headquarters. Located at Gulshan-Tejgaon Link Road, between Hatirjheel and Niketon.
20	Rangs RK Square	N/A	26	2027	Located at Gulshan 1.
21	Muntasir Howladar Tower	N/A	26	N/A	It'll be located at Gulshan 2.
22	Desh TV Tower	N/A	26	N/A	It'll be located at Tejgaon I/A.
23	Tropical Electra Tower	N/A	26	N/A	It'll be located at Purana Paltan.
24	Ananta Terraces	N/A	22×9	Phase 1 handover in December 2026	Luxury Condominium project by Ananta Real Estate Ltd.
25	Luxe Heights	N/A	23	N/A	Designed by INSPACE Architects Ltd., the building is being developed by Rancon Properties Ltd. Located in United City, Vatara, Dhaka.
26	Evergreen Hannan Tower	N/A	23	N/A	
27	Green A Z Tower	N/A	22	N/A	
28	Tejgaon Substation Tower	N/A	22	N/A	DPDC 132/33/11KV Substation.

== Timeline of tallest buildings of Dhaka ==
Name	Image	Height m (ft)	Floors	Years as tallest
Adamjee Court		28 (92)	7	1950–1956
DIT Building		36 (118)	9	1956–1959
Janata Capital and Investment Ltd.		42 (138)	10	1959–1960
Hotel Purbani		42 (138)	9	1960–1962
WAPDA Building		44 (144)	10	1962–1966
InterContinental Dhaka		52 (171)	11	1966–1980
Jiban Bima Tower		84.62 (278)	21	1980-1983
BCIC Building		87 (285)	21	1987-?
Bangladesh Development Bank Limited (BDBL) Bhaban		88 (289)	21	1983–1985
Bangladesh Bank Building		115 (377)	31	1985–2012
City Centre Dhaka		118 (387)	37	2012–2026
Pinnacle		152.4 (500)	40	2026-present

== See also ==
- List of tallest buildings in Bangladesh
- List of tallest buildings in Chittagong
- List of tallest buildings in Sylhet
- List of tallest buildings and structures in South Asia
- List of tallest buildings in Asia
- List of tallest buildings in the World
- List of tallest structures in the world
