= MGI Tower =

Skyscraper in Dhaka, Bangladesh

- এমজিআই টাওয়ার
- Alternative names: Grand Hyatt Dhaka, Meghna Group of Industries Tower

General information
- Status: Under construction
- Location: Tejgaon Industrial Area, Dhaka, Hatirjheel, Tejgaon I/A, Dhaka, Bangladesh
- Construction started: 2024
- Construction stopped: December, 2029
- Owner: Meghna Group of Industries

Height
- Height: 152.4 metres

Technical details
- Floor count: 39+B6
- Floor area: 146,000 m2

Design and construction
- Architecture firm: Skidmore, Owings & Merrill
- Main contractor: China State Construction Engineering Corporation

MGI Tower (short for Meghna Group of Industries), is an under-construction 152.4 m (500 ft), 39-story skyscraper in Tejgaon Industrial Area, Dhaka. The skyscraper is a project of the Bangladeshi industrial conglomerate Meghna Group of Industries (MGI). Located beside the Lake of Hatirjheel, it is expected to house the Grand Hyatt Dhaka and become one of the tallest buildings in Dhaka and Bangladesh once completed. Skidmore, Owings & Merrill, based in Chicago, United States, has designed the skyscraper, while China State Construction Engineering Corporation has been contracted to construct the project.

Featuring 6 basement floors, the skyscraper is said to be 'Bangladesh's first ultra-high-rise building utilizing the top-down construction method', according to CSCES.

== See also ==
- City Centre Dhaka
- Shanta Pinnacle
- Tropical TA Tower
- List of tallest buildings in Dhaka
- List of tallest buildings in Bangladesh
