= List of tallest buildings in Bangladesh =

This list of tallest buildings in Bangladesh ranks skyscrapers in Bangladesh based on official height. Most of the high-rise buildings & skyscrapers in Bangladesh are in the capital Dhaka. Currently, PINNACLE is the country's tallest building, with a height of 152.4 metres (500 ft).

As of mid-October 2026, Bangladesh has 19-21 buildings rising at least 100 m (328 ft) in height.

== Tallest buildings ==
This list ranks buildings in Bangladesh based on official height; unofficial or estimated height is included in the "Notes" section. Buildings are ranked by architectural height; in cases of equal height, the building with more floors is listed first. All the buildings listed below rise at least 80 metres (262 ft) from the ground. An asterisk (*) indicates that the building is still under-construction, but has been topped-out. The "Year" column indicates the year in which a building was completed.

Was the tallest building in Bangladesh upon completion.
Topped out & under construction.
Topped out, but construction has been halted indefinitely.
Cancelled/ Abandoned/ Teared down/ Somehow got destroyed.

Rank	Name	Location	Height (architectural) m (ft)	Floors	Year	Coordinates	Building type	Reference(s)
1	Shanta Pinnacle	Dhaka	152.4 metres (500 ft)	40	2026	23.7703°N 90.4075°E	Commercial	
	Hilton Dhaka	Dhaka	145–152.4 m (476–500 ft) (Note: According to the earliest available informations, Hilton Dhaka was supposed to be 152–152.4 m (499–500 ft) tall. Although, the author of this video claimed it to be approx. 145 m (476 ft) tall. @CityScraper. "Top 10 Tallest Buildings of Dhaka". YouTube.)	34	N/A	23.793100°N 90.415300°E	Hotel	
2	City Centre Dhaka	Dhaka	118 m (387 ft) (Note: Widely misreported as 171 m (561 ft) before. Later, claimed to be 118 m (387 ft) tall. But City Centre Dhaka is considered well above 118 metres by many people. Unofficial estimates claim it to be at least 140 m (459 ft) tall.)	37	2012	23°43′44.9″N 90°25′2.6″E	Commercial	
3	Innstar Trade Intercontinental	Dhaka	N/A (Note: There's no official height. But in this video, the author claimed it to be approx. 132 m (433 ft) tall. @CityScraper. "Top 10 Tallest Buildings of Dhaka". YouTube.)	32	2024	23°46′15.6″N 90°24′30.6″E	Commercial	
4	Suvastu Skyline Avenue	Dhaka	N/A (Note: There's no official height. Although, Suvastu Skyline Avenue's approximate height will be around 120–128 m (394–420 ft) tall. But in this video, the author claimed it to be approx. 122 m (400 ft) tall. @CityScraper. "Top 10 Tallest Buildings of Dhaka". YouTube.)	32	2026	23°47′6.7″N 90°25′1.2″E	Commercial	
5	Bangladesh Bank Building	Dhaka	115 m (377 ft)/ 137.16 m (450 ft)	31	1985	23.726600°N 90.423230°E	Commercial	
6	Aziz Court Imperial	Chittagong	112 m (367 ft)/ 128 m (420 ft) (Note: Officially, Aziz Court Imperial's height is 112 m (367 ft). But 128 m (420 ft) is shown here in this Wikipedia article:- Chittagong's Tallest Buildings.)	29	2017	22°19′35.4″N 91°48′58.3″E	Commercial	
7	Sheraton Dhaka Residences	Dhaka	121 metres (397 ft)	29	2020	23°47′37″N 90°24′23.4″E	Hotel	
8	Courtyard by Marriott Chittagong*	Chittagong	120 metres (394 ft)	30	2026	22.3215757°N 91.8115452°E	Hotel	
9	The Westin Dhaka	Dhaka	120 metres (394 ft)	26 (Note: Officially, The Westin Dhaka has 24 floors. But unofficially, it has 26/ 29 floors.)	2006	23°47′36.2″N 90°24′52.2″E	Hotel	
10	Mövenpick Hotel Khulna*	Khulna	N/A	29	N/A	22°50′31″N 89°32′22″E	Hotel	
11	Doreen Tower	Dhaka	112 metres (367 ft)	26	2013	23°47′41.3″N 90°24′50″E	Mixed-use	
	Unique Acropolis	Dhaka	N/A (Note: There's no official height. Unofficially, it'll be approx. 110 m (361 ft) tall.)	27	N/A	23°47′39″N 90°24′48.7″E	Hotel	
12	Ahmed Tower	Dhaka	108.8 metres (357 ft)	27	2018	23°47′37.5″N 90°24′16.5″E	Commercial	
13	Bangladesh Shipping Corporation Tower	Dhaka	N/A (Note: There's no official height. But in this video, the author claimed it to be approx. 107 m (351 ft) tall. @CityScraper. "Top 10 Tallest Buildings of Dhaka". YouTube.)	28	2017	23°43′46.6″N 90°24′54″E	Commercial	
14	Concord MBR Skyline*	Dhaka	106.67 metres (350 ft)	26	2026	23°46′36.5″N 90°24′59.4″E	Commercial	
15	Simpletree GSR	Dhaka	N/A (Note: There's no official height. Although, Simpletree GSR's approximate height will be around 110 m (361 ft) tall. But in this video, the author claimed it to be approx. 100 m (328 ft) tall. @CityScraper. "How Gulshan is Changing Dhaka's Skyline". YouTube.)	25	2024	23°47′27.6″N 90°24′57.6″E	Commercial	
16	Lily Pond Center	Dhaka	N/A (Note: There's no official height. Although, Lily Pond Center's approximate height will be around 100–112 m (328–367 ft).)	25	2019	23°43′18″N 90°25′17.6″E	Mixed-use	
17	Standard Bank HQ	Dhaka	N/A (Note: There's no official height. But in this video, the author claimed it to be approx. 100 m (328 ft) tall with 26 floors. @CityScraper. "How Gulshan is Changing Dhaka's Skyline". YouTube.)	26	2024	23°46′34″N 90°24′58.7″E	Commercial	
18	Shanta Forum	Dhaka	105 metres (344 ft)	25	2022	23°46′13.1″N 90°24′25.2″E	Commercial	
19	Tower 71	Chittagong	104 metres (341 ft)	25	2019	22°19′38″N 91°48′50″E	Commercial	
20	IDLC Finance HQ*	Dhaka	N/A	26	N/A	23°45′56.5″N 90°24′18.5″E	Commercial	
21	Islam Assure Center	Dhaka	N/A	24	2026	23°46′51.1″N 90°24′8.5″E	Commercial	
22	Meridian Kohinoor City	Chittagong	97.7 metres (321 ft)	23	2026	22°21′10.8″N 91°49′19.2″E	Mixed-use	
23	Jananta Bank Bhaban	Dhaka	96.7 metres (317 ft)	24	1985	23°43′44″N 90°25′2″E	Commercial	
24	Srom Bhaban Dhaka	Dhaka	96 metres (315 ft)	22	2019	23°44′5.5″N 90°24′36.6″E	Government	
25	Gulshan Centre Point	Dhaka	94 metres (308 ft)	23	2024	23°47′43.2″N 90°24′54″E	Commercial	
26	Aerial Legend	Chittagong	94 metres (308 ft)	20	2020	22°21′41″N 91°49′17.5″E	Commercial	
26	Makkah Madinah Trade Centre	Chittagong	94 metres (308 ft)	20	2012	22°19′35.7″N 91°48′55.5″E	Commercial	
26	Confidence Tower Badda	Dhaka	94 metres (308 ft)	20	2013	23°47′32.6″N 90°25′28″E	Commercial	
27	Simpletree Attalika	Dhaka	N/A	20	2024	23°47′33.5″N 90°24′55.1″E	Commercial	
28	Renaissance Dhaka Gulshan Hotel	Dhaka	90–95 m (295–312 ft) (est.)	19	2019	23°47′4″N 90°25′1.2″E	Hotel	
29	Navana Tower	Dhaka	92 metres (302 ft)	23	2002	23°46′49.5″N 90°24′59.3″E	Mixed-use	
29	Uday Tower	Dhaka	92 metres (302 ft)	23	2013	23°46′54.5″N 90°24′59.9″E	Commercial	
29	SKA Tower	Dhaka	92 metres (302 ft)	23 (Note: Depending on the sources, it has 21-23 floors. Officially, it's known as a 23 storey building.)	2018	23°47′38.9″N 90°24′14″E	Commercial	
29	Suvastu Muskan Tower	Dhaka	92 metres (302 ft)	23	2023	23°46′53.5″N 90°25′0.5″E	Commercial	
29	Rupayan Center	Dhaka	92 metres (302 ft)	23		23°46′50″N 90°24′21.6″E	Commercial	
30	Twin Tower Concord	Dhaka	92 metres (302 ft)	22		23°44′34″N 90°24′46.6″E	Mixed-use	
30	Gazi Bhaban	Dhaka	92 metres (302 ft)	22		23.72662°N 90.42159°E	Commercial	
30	Tokyo Plaza 1	Narayanganj	92 metres (302 ft)	22	N/A	23°36′47.8″N 90°30′8″E	Commercial	
30	Amirabad Sampreeti Tower	Mymensingh	92 metres (302 ft)	22	2025		Mixed-use	
31	Radisson Blu Chittagong Bay View	Chittagong	92 metres (302 ft)	20	2015	22°20′49.2″N 91°49′21.2″E	Hotel	
32	Sanmar Tower 1	Chittagong	91.44 metres (300 ft)	20	N/A	22°21′46″N 91°49′16″E	Commercial	
33	MG SAM Center	Dhaka	91.44 metres (300 ft)	19	2022	23°46′51.4″N 90°24′4.2″E	Commercial	
34	Sun Moon Star Tower	Dhaka	N/A	29	2019	23°43′33″N 90°25′8.9″E	Mixed-use	
35	World Trade Center Chittagong	Chittagong	90.7 metres (298 ft)	21	2016	22°19′33.5″N 91°48′54″E	Commercial	
36	Paltan China Town Shopping Complex	Dhaka	89 metres (292 ft)	22	2020	23°44′9.5″N 90°24′54.9″E	Commercial	
36	Sky View Park City	Dhaka	89 metres (292 ft)	22	2008	23°44′21.7″N 90°24′55″E	Residential	
37	NCC Bank Bhaban	Dhaka	89 metres (292 ft)	20	2014	23°43′39″N 90°25′16.5″E	Commercial	
37	Peoples Insurance Bhaban	Dhaka	89 metres (292 ft)	20	2005	23°43′33″N 90°25′14″E	Commercial	
37	Rahmania International Complex	Dhaka	89 metres (292 ft)	20		23°43′52.6″N 90°24′56.4″E	Mixed-use	
37	Gaus Pak AB Tower	Dhaka	89 metres (292 ft)	20		23°43′50.6″N 90°25′0.9″E	Mixed-use	
37	Eastern Baily Apartment	Dhaka	89 metres (292 ft)	20		23°44′27.5″N 90°24′30″E	Residential	
38	Rupayan Trade Center	Dhaka	89 metres (292 ft)	18		23°44′44.7″N 90°23′42″E	Commercial	
38	Nafi Tower	Dhaka	89 metres (292 ft)	18		23°46′52.5″N 90°24′59.7″E	Commercial	
39	Awal Centre	Dhaka	88 metres (289 ft)	23	2005	23°47′37.5″N 90°24′18″E	Commercial	
39	FR Tower	Dhaka	88 metres (289 ft)	23	2008	23°47′37.5″N 90°24′17.4″E	Commercial	
40	Bangladesh Development Bank Limited (BDBL) Bhaban	Dhaka	88 m (289 ft) (Note: 90 m (295 ft) is included in many sources.)	21	1983	23°43′40.9″N 90°24′54″E	Commercial	
41	Sena Kalyan Bhaban	Dhaka	87 metres (285 ft)	21	1990	23°43′35.5″N 90°25′19.5″E	Commercial	
41	BCIC Building	Dhaka	87 metres (285 ft)	21	1987	23°43′35.7″N 90°25′10.8″E	Commercial	
42	Concord Grand	Dhaka	86 metres (282 ft)	20	2005	23°44′22″N 90°24′54.3″E	Mixed-use	
43	Bashundhara City	Dhaka	85 metres (279 ft)	19	2004	23°45′1.8″N 90°23′26.5″E	Commercial	
44	Finance Square	Dhaka	80–90 metres (262–295 ft)	22	N/A	23°47′33″N 90°25′8″E	Commercial	
44	Tropical Metro Centre*	Dhaka	80–90 m (262–295 ft)	22	2026	23°44′0.5″N 90°25′8″E	Commercial	
45	Eunoos Trade Center	Dhaka	85 metres (279 ft)	20	2004		Commercial	
45	Baitul View Tower	Dhaka	85 metres (279 ft)	21	2010		Commercial	
46	Bangabandhu Sheikh Mujib Academic and Administrative Building*	Dhaka	N/A	20	N/A		Government	
47	Cabinet Division New 20 Storey Building Bangladesh Secretariat	Dhaka	N/A	20	2024		Government	
48	Q Hotel Dhaka*	Dhaka	N/A (Note: There's no official height. But compared to Dhaka Eye, which is 91.44 m (300 ft) tall, Q Hotel Dhaka will be over 80 m (262 ft).)	20	2026	23°50′13.4″N 90°27′27.6″E	Mixed-use	
49	Bangladesh Police HQ	Dhaka	N/A (Note: Bangladesh Police HQ is 69 m (226 ft) tall, which is widely known. But, height of this building varies, depending on the sources. 69 m (226 ft) is highly questionable according to various sources.)	20			Government	
50	Borak Zahir Tower	Dhaka	85 metres (279 ft)	20	2019		Commercial	
50	Unique Heights	Dhaka	85 metres (279 ft)	20	2012		Commercial	
51	Britannia Moonlight Tower	Dhaka	N/A	21	2020	23°46′54.5″N 90°25′0.4″E	Commercial	
52	Rangs Z Square	Dhaka	N/A	19	2024	23°47′21.9″N 90°24′59″E	Commercial	
53	Biswas Tower	Dhaka	85 metres (279 ft)	19	N/A		Residential	
54	Suvastu Nazar Valley	Dhaka	85 metres (279 ft)	17	2005		Mixed-use	
55	The Pearl Trade Center	Dhaka	85 metres (279 ft)	15 (Note: Officially, The Pearl Trade Center has 15-16 floors. According to various sources, the building is reported to have 21 floors, which is highly questionable.)	2017 (Note: Completion year disputed; sources report either 2015 or 2017.)		Commercial	
56	Jiban Bima Tower	Dhaka	84.62 metres (278 ft)	21	1980	23°43′39″N 90°24′57″E	Commercial	
57	অর্থ বিভাগ, অর্থ মন্ত্রণালয়, Bangladesh Secretariat Building No. 11	Dhaka	N/A	20	2023		Government	
58	Anabil Tower	Dhaka	N/A	19	N/A		Commercial	
59	Jabbar Tower	Dhaka	81 metres (266 ft)	22	2006		Commercial	
59	Red Crescent Borak Tower	Dhaka	81 metres (266 ft)	22	2013		Mixed-use	
59	YNT Trade Centre	Chittagong	81 metres (266 ft)	22	2022		Commercial	
60	Tower Of Aakash	Dhaka	N/A	21	2024	23°46′52.5″N 90°25′0.2″E	Commercial	
61	Hotel Sarina	Dhaka	81 metres (266 ft)	21	2003		Hotel	
61	Holiday Inn Dhaka City Centre	Dhaka	81 metres (266 ft)	21			Hotel	
61	Bulu Ocean Tower	Dhaka	81 metres (266 ft)	21	N/A	23°47′37.5″N 90°24′19.7″E	Commercial	
61	Rupayan Shelford	Dhaka	81 metres (266 ft)	21	2016		Commercial	
61	Northern Hi-Tech Hospital Tower	Rajshahi	81 metres (266 ft)	21	2022		Hospital	
61	BRAC Centre	Dhaka	81 metres (266 ft)	21	1995		Commercial	
61	Rupayan Lotus	Dhaka	81 metres (266 ft)	21			Residential	
62	Hosaf Skyline*	Dhaka	N/A	20	N/A	23°46′51.4″N 90°24′3″E	Commercial	
63	Borak Mehnur	Dhaka	81 metres (266 ft)	20	2017	23°47′37.5″N 90°24′23.8″E	Commercial	
63	Red Crescent Concord Tower	Dhaka	81 metres (266 ft)	20	N/A		Commercial	
63	Unique Trade Centre (UTC)	Dhaka	81 metres (266 ft)	20	2002		Commercial	
63	Karnaphuli Garden City	Dhaka	81 metres (266 ft)	20	1998		Mixed-use	
63	Planners Tower	Dhaka	81 metres (266 ft)	20	N/A	23°44′48.7″N 90°23′34″E	Commercial	
63	Sanmar Tower 2	Dhaka	81 metres (266 ft)	20	2018		Commercial	
63	Paltan Tower	Dhaka	81 metres (266 ft)	20	2013		Mixed-use	
63	Grameen Bank Building	Dhaka	81 metres (266 ft)	20	1983		Commercial	
63	Razia Tower	Dhaka	81 metres (266 ft)	20	2008		Residential	
63	Best Western Alliance	Chittagong	81 metres (266 ft)	20	2017	22.325945°N 91.81288°E	4 Star Hotel	
63	IDB Bhaban	Dhaka	81 metres (266 ft)	20	1987		Commercial	
63	Delta Life Tower	Khulna	81 metres (266 ft)	20	2013	22.81327°N 89.542293°E	Commercial	
63	Sukonna Tower	Dhaka	81 metres (266 ft)	20	2003		Mixed-use	
63	Marium Tower	Dhaka	81 metres (266 ft)	20	N/A		Residential	
63	Concord Regency	Dhaka	81 metres (266 ft)	20	2003		Mixed-use	
63	Bangladesh Secretariat Building No.6	Dhaka	81 metres (266 ft)	20	2021		Government	
63	Sheltech Rahman Villa	Dhaka	81 metres (266 ft)	20	2012		Residential	
63	Shegunbagicha Concord	Dhaka	81 metres (266 ft)	20	2003	23°44′5.5″N 90°24′23.3″E	Residential	
63	Rupayan Z.A. Tower	Dhaka	81 metres (266 ft)	20	2007		Residential	
64	BRAC University Old Campus Tower	Dhaka	N/A (Note: Officially 64 m (210 ft) tall. Realistically, it'll be around or over 80 m (262 ft).)	20	2001		Educational	
65	Multiplan Shahjalal City Tower	Sylhet	81 metres (266 ft)	20			Residential	
66	Navana Circular Height	Dhaka	81 metres (266 ft)	19	N/A		Mixed-use	
67	MMK Aakash Avenue	Dhaka	N/A	18		23°47′39″N 90°24′44.8″E	Commercial	
68	Rupayan Taj	Dhaka	81 metres (266 ft)	17	2012		Mixed-use	
69	The Peninsula Chittagong	Chittagong	81 metres (266 ft)	16	2015		5 Star Hotel	
70	Sena Kalyan Trade Centre	Chittagong	80 metres (262 ft)	20			Commercial	
70	Finlay South City	Chittagong	80 metres (262 ft)	20	2024	22°22′2.2″N 91°50′34.8″E	Mixed-use	
70	Sadiq Tower	Sylhet	80 metres (262 ft)	20	2026		Mixed-use	
70	Progoti Tower	Mymensingh	80 metres (262 ft)	20			Mixed-use	
70	CDA Housing Agrabad Tower I	Chittagong	80 metres (262 ft)	20	2024	22°19′30″N 91°48′21″E	Residential	
70	CDA Housing Agrabad Tower II	Chittagong	80 metres (262 ft)	20	2024	22°19′30″N 91°48′21″E	Residential	
70	CDA Housing Agrabad Tower III	Chittagong	80 metres (262 ft)	20	2024	22°19′30″N 91°48′21″E	Residential	
70	CDA Housing Agrabad Tower IV	Chittagong	80 metres (262 ft)	20	2024	22°19′30″N 91°48′21″E	Residential	
70	CDA Housing Agrabad Tower V	Chittagong	80 metres (262 ft)	20	2024	22°19′30″N 91°48′21″E	Residential	
70	CDA Housing Agrabad Tower VI	Chittagong	80 metres (262 ft)	20	2024	22°19′30″N 91°48′21″E	Residential	
70	CDA Housing Agrabad Tower VII	Chittagong	80 metres (262 ft)	20	2024	22°19′30″N 91°48′21″E	Residential	
70	CDA Housing Agrabad Tower VIII	Chittagong	80 metres (262 ft)	20	2024	22°19′30″N 91°48′21″E	Residential	
70	CDA Housing Agrabad Tower IX	Chittagong	80 metres (262 ft)	20	2024	22°19′30″N 91°48′21″E	Residential	
71	TMSS Medical College and Hospital	Bogra	80 metres (262 ft)	19			Hospital	
71	Fareast Islamic Insurance Tower	Rajshahi	80 metres (262 ft)	19	2022		Commercial	
71	Khulna City Medical College Hospital	Khulna	80 metres (262 ft)	19	2016	22.813143°N 89.556407°E	Hospital	

== Under construction ==
This article list's buildings that are under-construction in Bangladesh and are planned to rise at least 120 m (394 ft). Buildings that have already been topped out are excluded.

Name	Location	Height m (ft)	Floors	Year* (est.)	Notes	Ref.
Jolshiri Twin Towers - Tower 1	Dhaka	250 m (820 ft)	65	N/A	The tallest buildings of the Jolshiri Abashon business circle. The Jolshiri Twin Towers are the landmarks of the smart city, with their height reaching 250m.	
Jolshiri Twin Towers - Tower 2	Dhaka	250 m (820 ft)	65	N/A	The tallest buildings of the Jolshiri Abashon business circle. The Jolshiri Twin Towers are the landmarks of the smart city, with their height reaching 250m.	
Tropical TA Tower	Dhaka	152.4 m (500 ft)	45	2029	Constructed by Tropical Homes Limited replacing Malibagh Supermarket. Will contain hotel and shopping center.	
SKS Sky Reach	Dhaka	152.4 m (500 ft)	41	N/A	Constructed by Sena Kalyan Constructions and Developments, the building is under construction.	
MGI Tower	Dhaka	152.4 m (500 ft)	39	2029	MGI Tower is a project of Meghna Group of Industries (MGI). It'll be one of the tallest skyscrapers as well as the 2nd largest skyscraper by GFA in Dhaka, Bangladesh once completed.	
Dhaka Tower	Dhaka	152.4 m (500 ft)	38	2028	Designed by OMA, located in Tejgaon I/A. Shanta Holdings is behind the development. Upon completion, Dhaka Tower will be the largest skyscraper by GFA in Dhaka, Bangladesh.	
The Prism	Dhaka	N/A	37	N/A	The Prism is the biggest project by Amin Mohammad Foundation Ltd. till now.	
Shanta Vista	Dhaka	N/A	36	N/A	It has been developed by Shanta Holdings. Vista will be one of the tallest buildings in Dhaka & Bangladesh once completed.	
Shanta Zenith	Dhaka	N/A	35	N/A	It has been developed by Shanta Holdings. Zenith will be one of the tallest buildings in Dhaka & Bangladesh once completed.	
Emnipur Tower	Dhaka	N/A	35	N/A		
Mirai by Nirman	Dhaka	138 m (453 ft)	30	2027	It has been developed by Nirman International. Finnish architecture firm ARCO has designed the high-rise.	
Mövenpick Hotel Khulna	Khulna	N/A or 141 m (463 ft)	29	2026	Five Star Hotel complex under the Mövenpick Hotels & Resorts brand.	
NH Tower	Dhaka	134 m (440 ft)	32	2028	Commercial skyscraper, constructed by Nexteon Developments Limited.	
Eureka Tower	Dhaka	120 m (394 ft)	30		Developed by Amin Mohammad Foundation Ltd. It'll be the second tallest skyscraper of Gulshan 1 upon completion.	

== Proposed, approved, or on hold ==
This list ranks buildings that were once under construction and are now on hold and are planned to rise at least 140 metres (460 ft) or 40 floors tall.

=== Approved ===
This lists buildings that are under-construction in Bangladesh and are planned to rise at least 152.4 m (500 ft). Buildings that have already been topped-out are excluded.

Name	Location	Height ft (m)	Floors	Year* (est.)	Notes
Purbachal Convention Center	Purbachal	720 ft (219 m)	45	2030	
Purbachal Grade A Offices	Purbachal	650 ft (198 m)	45	2030	
Purbachal Business Hotel	Purbachal	640 ft (195 m)	42	2030	
Bangladesh Jute Mills Corporation Headquarters	Dhaka	620 ft (189 m)	47	2026	
Borak Hatirjheel	Dhaka	607 ft (185 m)	45	2026	
Purbachal Residential Towers	Dhaka	558 ft (170 m)	10 X 42	2032	
Purbachal Infra Zone Towers	Dhaka	558 ft (170 m)	10 X 42	2032	
Chittagong Port Administrative Building	Chittagong	525 ft (160 m)	40	2026	

=== Proposed ===
This lists buildings that are under-construction in Bangladesh and are planned to rise at least 152.4 m (500 ft). Buildings that have already been topped-out are excluded.

Name	Location	Height ft (m)	Floors	Year* (est.)	Notes
Legacy Tower	Purbachal Sector-19	1,552 ft (473 m)	111	2030	Upon completion, Legacy Tower will be the tallest building in Bangladesh, and also its first supertall skyscraper. The tower is also projected to be the tallest building in South Asia.
Liberation Tower	Purbachal Sector-19	1,109 ft (338 m)	71	2030	If completed before Legacy Tower, it'll be the tallest building in Bangladesh.
Language Tower	Purbachal Sector-19	850 ft (259 m)	52	2029	If completed before Legacy Tower & Liberation Tower, it'll be the tallest building in Bangladesh.
Twin Chittagong	Chittagong	540 ft (165 m)	41	2030	
BSRM Tower	Chittagong	525 ft (160 m)	32	2028	
One Chittagong T1-T4	Chittagong	500 ft (152 m)	37	2030	

== Timeline of tallest buildings ==
This is a list of buildings that once held the title of tallest building in Bangladesh.

Name	Image	City	Height	Floors	Years as Tallest
Adamjee Court		Dhaka	30 metres (98 ft)	7	1950-1956
DIT Building		Dhaka	40 metres (131 ft)	9	1956-1959
Janata Capitals and Investment Ltd.		Dhaka	45 metres (148 ft)	10	1959-1960
Hotel Purbani		Dhaka	46 metres (151 ft)	9	1960-1962
WAPDA Building		Dhaka	50 metres (164 ft)	10	1962-1966
Hotel Intercontinental		Dhaka	58 metres (190 ft)	11	1966-1971
Jiban Bima Tower		Dhaka	85 metres (279 ft)	21	1971-1976
BCIC Building		Dhaka	87 metres (285 ft)	20	1976-1983
Bangladesh Development Bank Limited (BDBL) Bhaban		Dhaka	90 metres (295 ft)	22	1983-1985
Bangladesh Bank Building	Bangladesh Bank Building at right with Sena Kalyan Bhaban at left	Dhaka	115 metres (377 ft)	30	1985-2012
City Centre Dhaka		Dhaka	118 metres (387 ft)	37	2012–2026
Shanta Pinnacle		Dhaka	152.4 metres (500 ft)	40	2026-present

== See also ==
- List of tallest buildings in Dhaka
- List of tallest buildings in Chittagong
- List of tallest buildings in Sylhet
- List of tallest buildings and structures in South Asia
- List of tallest buildings in the World
- List of future tallest buildings
- List of tallest structures in the world
