= Eastern Federal Credit Union Insurance Building =

Coordinates: 23.732972°N 90.417231°E

- Interactive map of the Eastern Federal Credit Union Insurance Building area

Record height
- Tallest in Bangladesh from 1972 to 1985^{[I]}
- Preceded by: Jiban Bima Tower
- Surpassed by: Bangladesh Bank Building

General information
- Type: Commercial Building
- Location: Dhaka, Bangladesh
- Completed: 1972
- Owner: Eastern Federal Credit Union Insurance

Height
- Roof: 86.82 m (284.84 feet)
- Top floor: 27

Technical details
- Floor count: 27

Eastern Federal Credit Union Insurance Building is a tall building located in Dhaka, Bangladesh. It is located in Motijheel, the central business district of the metropolis. It rises to a height of 86.82 m (285 ft) and comprises a total of 27 floors. It houses the headquarters of Eastern Federal Credit Union Insurance. Built in 1972, it was the tallest building in Bangladesh until 1985, when Bangladesh Bank Building completed out at 137.1 m (450 ft). Currently, it is one of the tallest High-rises in Bangladesh.

== See also ==
- List of tallest buildings in Dhaka
