= Courtyard by Marriott Chittagong =

Courtyard Marriott
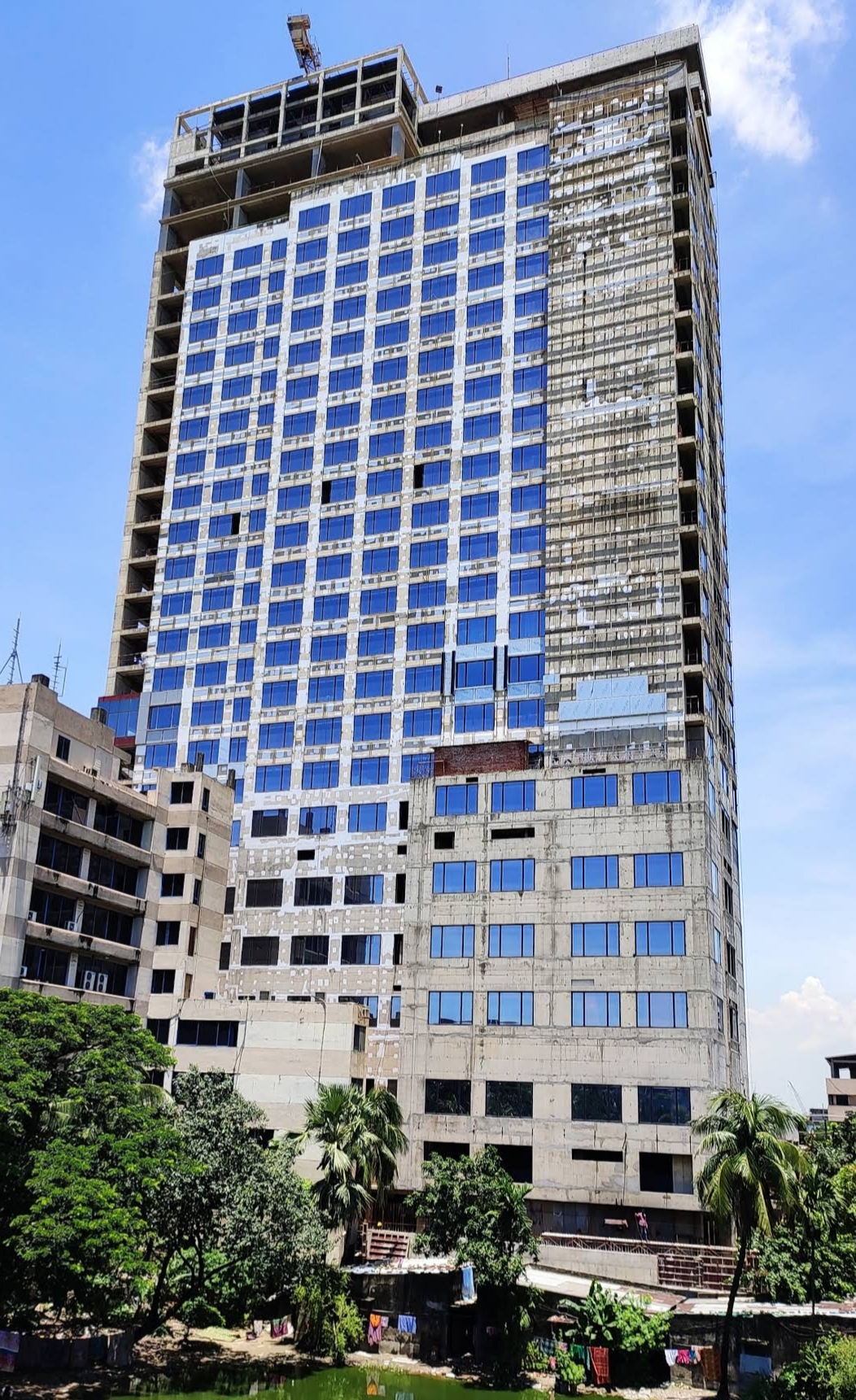
- Interactive map of the Courtyard Marriott area
- Alternative names: Courtyard Marriott Hotel

General information
- Status: Under construction
- Type: five-star hotel
- Location: Nimtala, Sheikh Mujib Road, Chattogram, Bangladesh
- Coordinates: 22.3215757°N 91.8115452°E
- Estimated completion: 2021
- Owner: Marriott International

Height
- Height: 120 m (394 ft)

Technical details
- Floor count: 30

Design and construction
- Developer: Pacific Jeans Group

Other information
- Parking: yes

Courtyard by Marriott Chittagong is an under construction five star hotel by Courtyard by Marriott. It is located in Agrabad, the central business area in Chattogram, Bangladesh. It is the second five-star hotel in the port city.

== See also ==
- List of tallest buildings in Chittagong
- List of tallest buildings in Bangladesh
