= Sena Kalyan Bhaban =

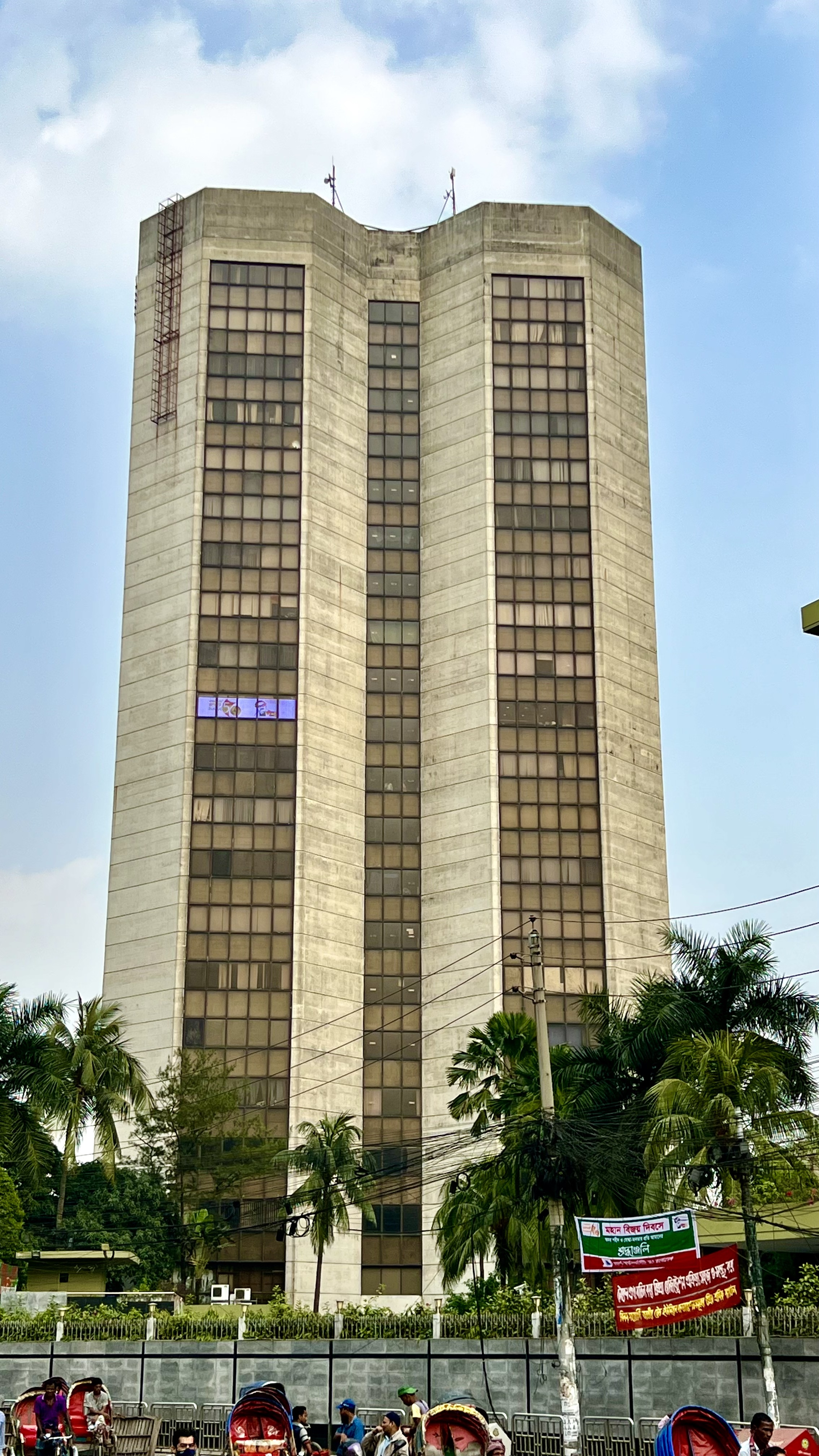
- Rear view
- Interactive map of the Sena Kalyan Bhaban area

General information
- Status: Completed
- Type: Commercial building
- Location: Plot 195, Motijheel, Dhaka, Bangladesh
- Coordinates: 23.7269°N 90.4228°E
- Construction started: April 1982
- Completed: August 1990
- Cost: Taka 600.0 million
- Owner: Sena Kalyan Sangstha

Height
- Roof: 69 metres (226 ft)
- Top floor: 21

Technical details
- Floor count: 21
- Floor area: 321,000 ft2 (29821.88 m2)
- Grounds: 27.00 Katha

Design and construction
- Main contractor: Sena Kalyan Sangstha

Sena Kalyan Bhaban is a 21-storied commercial building located at 195, Motijheel Commercial Area, Dhaka on an area of 1.35 bighas of land. Previously, on the same space there was a rest house for ex-armed forces personnel. The foundation stone of the 21-storied Sena Kalyan Bhaban was laid in April 1982. Construction was completed in August 1990. The total floor space of the building is 321,000 sq. ft. and the rentable space is 213,239 sq. ft. It is a building for the Sena Kalyan Sangstha.

== See also ==
- List of tallest buildings in Dhaka
- List of tallest buildings in Bangladesh
