= Janata Bank Bhaban =

Coordinates: 23.7289°N 90.4171°E

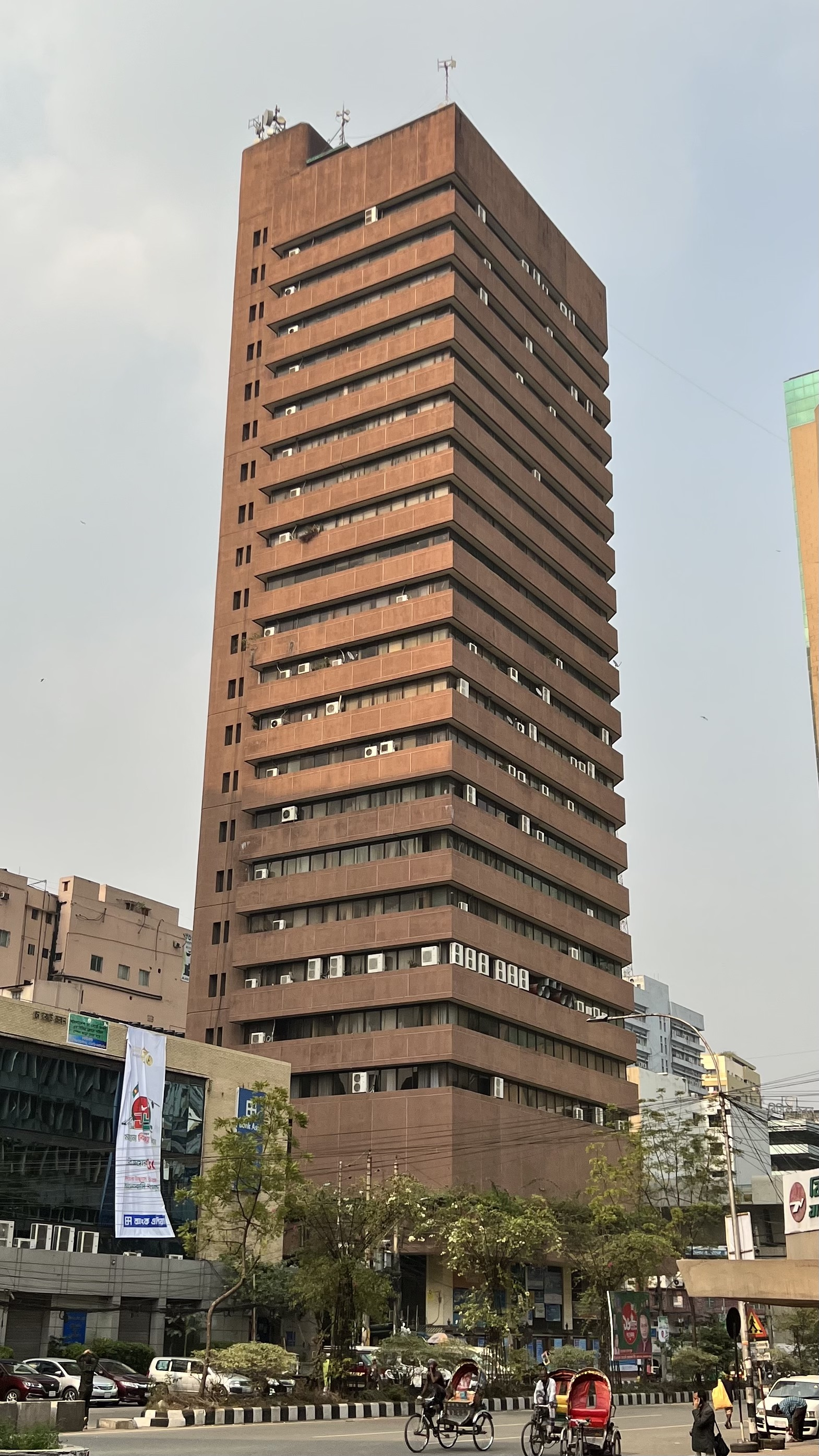
- Janata Bank Bhaban at night
- Interactive map of the Janata Bank Bhaban area

General information
- Status: Completed
- Type: Commercial
- Location: 110, Motijheel, Dhaka, Bangladesh
- Completed: 1985
- Owner: Janata Bank

Height
- Roof: 78 metres (256 ft)
- Top floor: 24

Technical details
- Floor count: 24
- Floor area: 180000 sft

Design and construction
- Developer: Concord Engineers and Construction Limited

Janata Bank Tower is a high-rise office building located in Dhaka, Bangladesh. It is located in Motijheel, the central business district of the metropolis. It rises to a height of 77.18 metres (253.2 ft) and has 24 floors. It houses the headquarters of Janata Bank, the premier financial institution of the country. Bangladesh Bank Building is one of the earliest high-rises that the city constructed. Built in 1985, it is one of the tallest buildings in Bangladesh. Currently, it is the nation's 37th tallest building. This 24-storey Head office building of Janata Bank at Motijheel was built by Concord Group.

== See also ==
- List of tallest buildings in Dhaka
