= Hilton Dhaka =

Dhaka Hotel

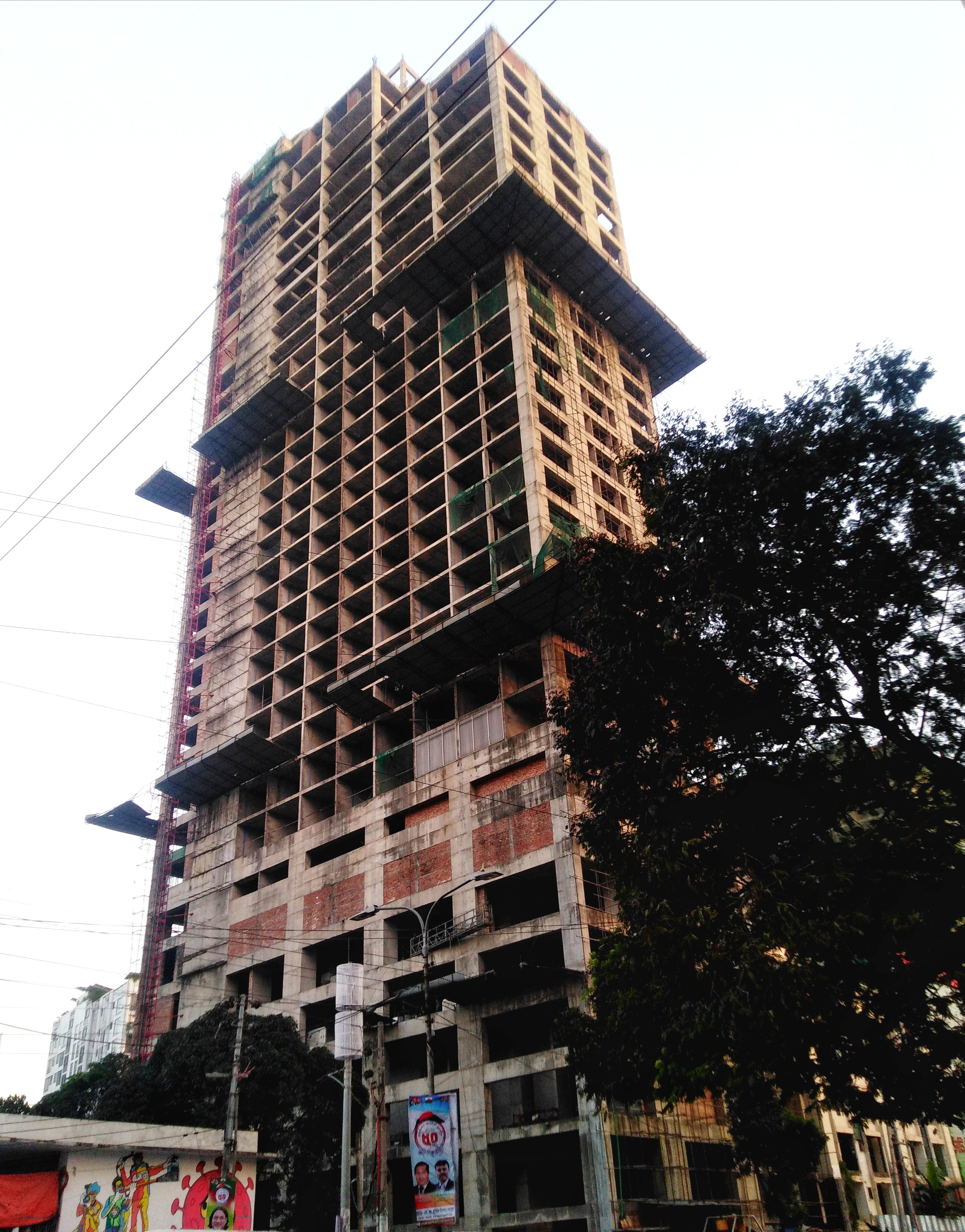
- Hotel chain: Hilton Worldwide

General information
- Status: Topped out & on hold
- Type: Hotel
- Location: Main Gulshan Avenue, Gulshan 2, Gulshan, Dhaka, Bangladesh
- Opening: 2025
- Owner: Premier Hotels & Resorts
- Operator: Hilton Hotels & Resorts

Height
- Height: 152–152.4 m (499–500 ft)

Technical details
- Floor count: 34

Other information
- Number of rooms: 250
- Parking: Yes, multi-level

Website
- hilton.com

Hilton Dhaka is a Hilton brand hotel located at Gulshan Avenue in Dhaka, Bangladesh. The building is topped out, and the hotel was expected to open by 2025. At the estimated height of 152 or 152.4 metres, it is one of the tallest buildings in Dhaka, and the tallest hotel building in Bangladesh. The building has 34 floors, including a 5-floor underground basement.

== See also ==
- List of tallest buildings in Bangladesh
- List of tallest buildings in Dhaka
