= Concord Grand =

- কনকর্ড গ্রান্ড
- Interactive map of the Concord Grand area

General information
- Status: Completed
- Type: Mixed-use
- Location: 169/1, Shantinagar, Dhaka-1217, Bangladesh
- Construction started: 1999
- Completed: 2005
- Owner: Concord Group

Height
- Roof: 86 metres (282 ft)
- Top floor: 25

Technical details
- Floor count: 25

Design and construction
- Developer: Concord Group

Concord Grand is a mixed-use building located at 169/1, Shantinagar, Dhaka-1217, Bangladesh. It is one of the tallest buildings in Dhaka with a height of 86 metres (282 ft). It is constructed by Concord Group. The building has 25 floors, which are used for commercial and residential purposes. There has office and mosque and mount2ocean Travel and Tours located at 4th floor

== See also ==
- List of tallest buildings in Bangladesh
- List of tallest buildings in Dhaka
