= List of tallest buildings in Sylhet =

Sylhet is a north-eastern city of Bangladesh. It is also the divisional headquarters of Sylhet Division. With more than 1.2 million population, the city is one of the largest in Bangladesh.

== Tallest buildings ==
This lists ranks buildings in Sylhet based on their official height. All the buildings listed below rise at least 50 metres (164 ft) from the ground. They are either completed or topped-out. An equals sign (=) following a rank indicates the same height between two or more buildings. The "Year" column indicates the year in which a building was completed.

=== Buildings above 50m ===
Rank	Name	Location	Image	Height	Floors	Year	Building Type
1	Multiplan Shahjalal City 1 (Syed plaza)	Shahjalal uposhohor		81 metres (266 ft)	20	2015	Residential
2	Sadiq Tower	Noyashorok		80 metres (262 ft)	20	2023	Commercial
3	Syl Valley Castle 1	VIP road		64 metres (210 ft)	16	2015	Residential
4	Mount Adora Hospital	Akhalia		65 metres (213 ft)	16	2015	Commercial
5	Excel Tower	Subidbazar		64 metres (210 ft)	16	2015	Residential
6	Hotel holly city	Dorgah gate		64 metres (210 ft)	16	2014	Residential
7	Tahsin Tower	Akhalia		64 metres (210 ft)	16	2016	Residential
8	Hotel Noorjahan Grand	Dorgah gate		65 metres (213 ft)	16	2015	Hotel
9	La rose hotel	West dorga gate		56 metres (184 ft)	14	2014	Hotel
10	Arcadia Shopping Mall	Housing estate road		56 metres (184 ft)	14	2017	Commercial
11	Surma Tower	VIP road		56 metres (184 ft)	14	2015	Mixed-use
12	Elegant shopping city	Zindabazar		60 metres (197 ft)	15	2015	Commercial
14	Hill view tower 1	Khadim para		56 metres (184 ft)	14	2014	Hotel
15	Hill view tower 2	Khadim para		56 metres (184 ft)	14	2014	Hotel
16	Rupayan mubashwir palace	Shibhonj		56 metres (184 ft)	14	2017	Residential
17	Barvuiya siddique plaza	Jindabazar		56 metres (184 ft)	14	2014	Mixed-use
18	Merlin tower	Subidbazar		56 metres (184 ft)	14	2014	Residential
19	Movenpick hotel	Khadim nogor		56 metres (184 ft)	13	2019	Hotel
20	Apon white house	Sagardighi road		56 metres (184 ft)	13	2015	Residential
21	Apon blue tower	Sagardighi road		56 metres (184 ft)	13	2015	Residential
22	Sylhet independent college			56 metres (184 ft)	13	2014	Educational
23	Noorjahan tower	Sobhanighat		56 metres (184 ft)	13	2014	Residential
24	Garden city tower	Bishwa road		56 metres (184 ft)	13	2012	Mixed-use
25	Shikder tower			56 metres (184 ft)	13	2018	Residential
26	Crystal High Tower	Roynagar		56 metres (184 ft)	13		Residential
27	Hotel Garden Inn	Bishwa road		52 metres (171 ft)	13	2012	Hotel

== Tallest Under Construction ==
Rank	Name	Location	Height	Floors	Year	Building Type
1	Sylhot city	Shibgonj	100 metres (328 ft)	25	2024	Commercial
2	Sky city	Akhalia	100 metres (328 ft)	25	2024	Commercial
3	IT centre	Zindabazar	80 metres (262 ft)	20	2024	Commercial
4	Impulse Tower	Rikabibazar	90 metres (295 ft)	22		Commercial
5	Kibria Urban Tower	Mirabazar	72 metres (236 ft)	18		Commercial
6	Star plaza	Jindabazar	60 metres (197 ft)	15		Commercial
7	TAC hotel and resort	Shibgonj	60 metres (197 ft)	15		Hotel

== See also ==
- List of tallest buildings in Bangladesh
- List of tallest buildings in Dhaka
- List of tallest buildings in Chittagong
- List of tallest buildings and structures in South Asia
- List of tallest buildings in Asia
- List of tallest buildings in the World
- List of tallest structures in the world
