= List of tallest buildings in Chittagong =

This list of tallest buildings in Chittagong enumerates high-rises in Chittagong, Bangladesh. Chittagong is one of the major cities in Bangladesh. By October 2026, there're 3-4 buildings in Chittagong rising at least 100 metres (328 ft), as well as, numerous buildings rising at least 80 metres (262 ft), which is second-highest in Bangladesh. Chittagong has many high-rise buildings, both residential and commercial. Aziz Court Imperial is the tallest building in Chittagong with a height of 128 metres (420 ft) since 2017.

As of late 2025, there're more than 500 high-rise buildings exceeding ten floors in the city.

== Tallest buildings ==
This lists ranks buildings in Chittagong based on their official height. All the buildings listed below rise at least 60 metres (197 ft) from the ground. They are either completed or topped-out. An equals sign (=) following a rank indicates the same height between two or more buildings. The "Year" column indicates the year in which a building was completed.

=== Buildings above 60m ===
Was Chittagong's tallest building upon completion.
Topped out & under construction.
Topped out, but construction has been halted indefinitely.

Rank	Name	Image	Height m (ft)	Floors	Year	Reference(s)	Notes
1	Aziz Court Imperial		128 metres (420 ft)	29	2017		Commercial
2	Courtyard Marriott Hotel*		120 metres (394 ft)	30	2026		5 Star Hotel
3	Tower 71		104 metres (341 ft)	25	2016		Commercial
4	CDA Square 3		100 metres (328 ft)	25	2024		Residential
5	Meridian Kohinoor City		97.7 metres (321 ft)	23	2026		Mixed-use
6	World Trade Center Chittagong		96 metres (315 ft)	23	2016		Commercial
7	CDA Square 2		96 metres (315 ft)	23	2024		Residential
8	Aerial Legend		94 metres (308 ft)	20	2020		Commercial
9	Makkah Madina Trade Centre		93 metres (305 ft)	20	2012		Commercial
10	Radisson Blu Chittagong Bay View		92 metres (302 ft)	20	2015		5 Star Hotel
11	Sanmar Tower 1		85 metres (279 ft)	20	N/A		Commercial
12	CDA Square 1		85 metres (279 ft)	20	2024		Residential
13	Best Western Alliance		81 metres (266 ft)	20	2017		4 Star Hotel
14-22	CDA Housing Agrabad Tower I, II, III, IV, V, VI, VII, VIII, IX		80 metres (262 ft)	20	2024		Govt. Residence
23	Finlay South City		80 metres (262 ft)	20	2024		Mixed-use
24	The Peninsula Chittagong		81 metres (266 ft)	16	2015		4 Star Hotel
25	YNT TRADE CENTER		81 metres (266 ft)	20	2022		Commercial
26	CDA Avenue Tower (Zia Park)		81 metres (266 ft)	20	2019		Residential
27	Evercare Hospital		72 metres (236 ft)	17	2018		Hospital
28	Zila Parishad Administrative Building		72 metres (236 ft)	18	2022		Govt. Office
29	CPDL Galleria		70 metres (230 ft)	18	2021	Galleria	Mixed-use
30	USTC University		70 metres (230 ft)	18	2021	University of Science and Technology Chittagong	Educational
31	Finlay Square		68 metres (223 ft)	17	2016		Mixed-use
32	Government Residence, Katalganj		65 metres (213 ft)	17	2022		Govt. Residence

(*) Indicates still under-construction, but has been topped-out.

== Under construction, proposed and approved ==
This list features buildings that are currently in under construction, proposed and approved in the city. All the buildings listed below stand at least 20 floors.

Sr No	Name	Floors	Height	Location	Type	Status
1	Chittagong City Center	51	204.2 m (670 ft)	Agrabad	Mixed Use	Approved
2	A.K. Khan Tower	47	200 m (656 ft)	Agrabad	Mixed Use	Approved
3	Twin Chittagong	41	165 m (541 ft		Mixed Use	Proposed
5	Chittagong Port Administrative Building	40	160 m (525 ft)	Mooring road	Commercial	Under construction
6	BSRM Tower	32	160 m (525 ft)	Agrabad	Commercial	Proposed
7	Concord Barik Tower	37	152 m (499 ft)	Agrabad	Commercial	Proposed
8	One Chittagong T1-T4	37×4	150 m (492 ft)		Residential	Proposed
12	Younusco Tower	32	128 m (419 ft)	Nasirabad	Commercial	Proposed
13	NBR Chittagong	32	128 m (419 ft)	Agrabad	Commercial	Approved
14	Doreen tower	30	122 m (400 ft)	Agrabad	Commercial	Proposed
15	Sanmar Green Park Tower 1	29	116 m (381 ft)	Jalalabad Byzid Bostami	Residential	Under construction
16	Sanmar Green Park Tower 2	29	116 m (381 ft)	Jalalabad Byzid Bostami	Residential	Under construction
17	Sanmar Green Park Tower 3	29	116 m (381 ft)	Jalalabad Byzid Bostami	Residential	Under construction
18	Port Tower	28	115 m (377 ft)	Port	Commercial	Approved
19	Epic Tower	27	110 m (361 ft)	Muradpur	Commercial	Approved
20	Novotel Chittagong	27	110 m (361 ft)	Akhtaruzzaman flyover	Hotel	Under construction
21	Equity well trade centre	26	110 metres (361 ft)	OR Nizam Road	Commercial	Under construction
22	Sanmar Knightsbridge	26	104 m (341 ft)	Duncan Hills	Residential	Under construction
23	KSRM Condo	25	100 m (328 ft)	Khulshi	Residential	Under Construction
25	Padma Oil Company Tower	25	100 m (328 ft)	Sadarghat	Commercial	Approved
27	Sanmar Orchard Garden	25	100 metres (328 ft)	Yakub future park	Residential	Under construction
29	CDA Square 3	25	100 metres (328 ft)	Nasirabad	Residential	Under construction
30	Chittagong city corporation building	25	100 metres (328 ft)	Tiger pass	Office building	Under construction
31	Meridian Hospitality ltd.	25	100 metres (328 ft)	Wasa Circle	Hotel	Under construction
32	ELG Skypark	23	92 m (302 ft)	Baddarhat Circle	Residential	Under Construction
33	CDA Square 2	22	88 metres (289 ft)	Nasirabad	Residential	Under construction
34	Sanmar Sky Tower	21	88 metres (289 ft)	Panchlaish	Residential	Under construction
36	Karmajibi Nari Dorm	21	88 m 289 ft)	Saltgola	Mixed Use	Under Construction
37	CDA Square 1	20	81 metres (266 ft)	Nasirabad	Residential	Under construction
38	Finlay South City	20	81 metres (266 ft)	Bahaddarhat Circle	Mixed use	Under construction
39	Meghna Bhaban	20	81 metres (266 ft)	Agrabad	Mixed use	Under construction
40	Chittagong WASA	20	81 metres (266 ft)	Dampara	Mixed use	Under construction
41	Sanmar Edenia Ayub	20	81 metres (266 ft)	Kapashgola	Residential	Under construction
43	Finlay MN Marigold	20	81 metres (266 ft)	Panchlaish	Residential	Under construction
44	Navana Jalal Palace	20	81 metres (266 ft)	Mehedibagh	Residential	Under construction
45	Sanmar Ocho Harmanas	20	81 metres (266 ft)	Katalganj	Residential	Under construction
47	Sanmar Daxinayana	20	81 metres (266 ft)	DC hill	Residential	Under construction
49	Ranks FC Khan Tower	20	81 metres (266 ft)	Sheikh Mujib Road	Mixed use	Under construction
50	Aziz Colony	20	81 m (266 ft)	Nawab Sirajuddoula Road	Residential	Under Construction
52	CPDL Ayesha Icon	20	81 m 266 ft)	Jamal Khan	Mixed Use	Under Construction
53-55	One Chittagong T5-T7	20-30	81–120 m(266–393 ft)		Residential	Proposed

== See also ==
- List of tallest buildings in Bangladesh
- List of tallest buildings in Dhaka
- List of tallest buildings in Sylhet
- List of tallest buildings and structures in South Asia
- List of tallest buildings in Asia
- List of tallest buildings in the World
- List of tallest structures in the world
