= Navana Tower =

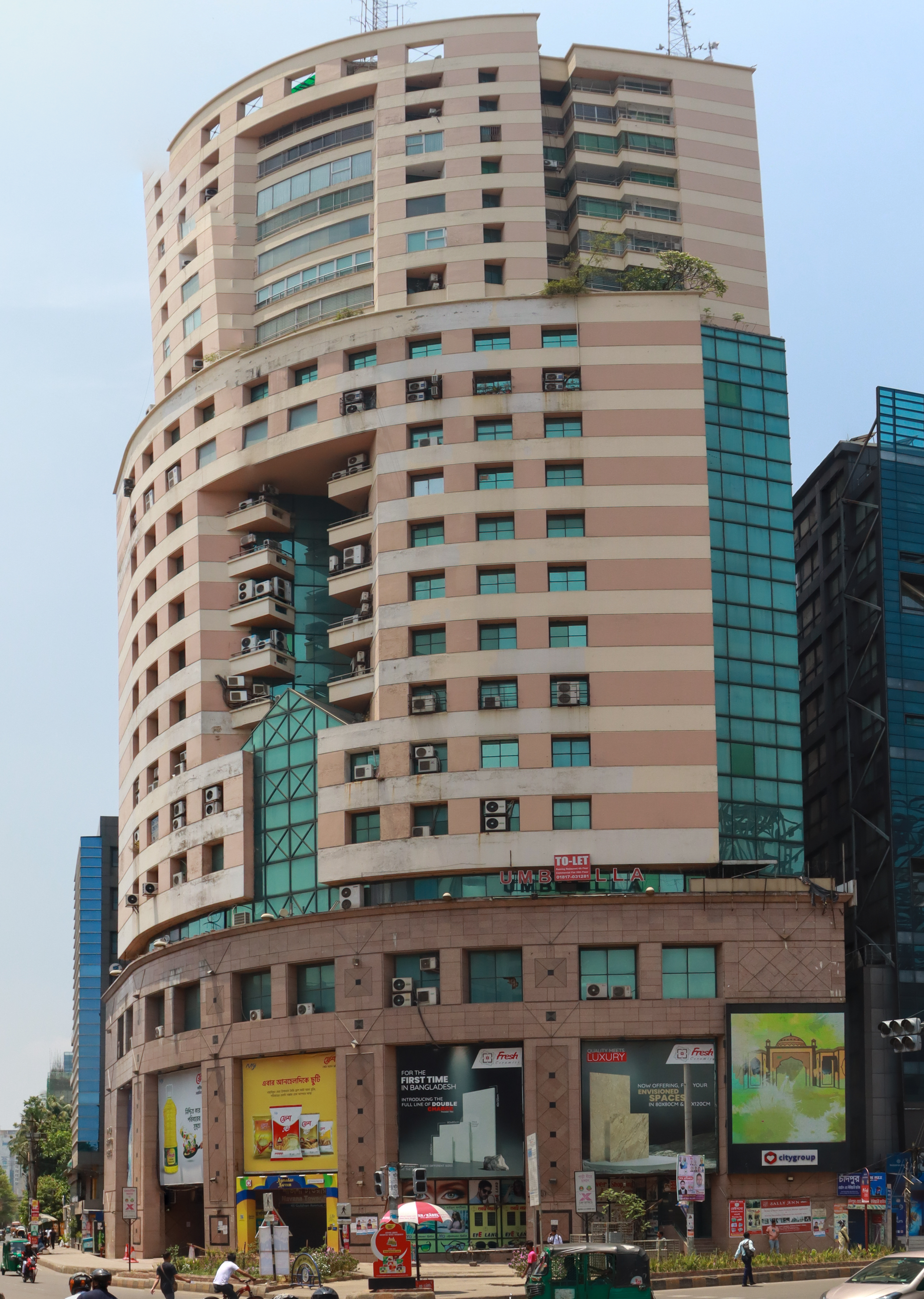
- Navana Tower in Gulshan-1 circle

General information
- Type: Mixed use building
- Location: 45 Gulshan Avenue, Gulshan-1 Circle, Dhaka-1212
- Coordinates: 23.7806°N 90.4163°E
- Completed: 2002

Height
- Roof: 74.07 m (243 ft)
- Top floor: 23

Technical details
- Floor count: 23
- Lifts/elevators: 2

Navana Tower is a high-rise located in Dhaka, Bangladesh. It is located in Gulshan, one of the central business districts of the metropolis. It rises up to a height of 74.07 m (243 ft) and has 23 floors. Navana Tower is the nineteenth tallest high-rise in Dhaka.

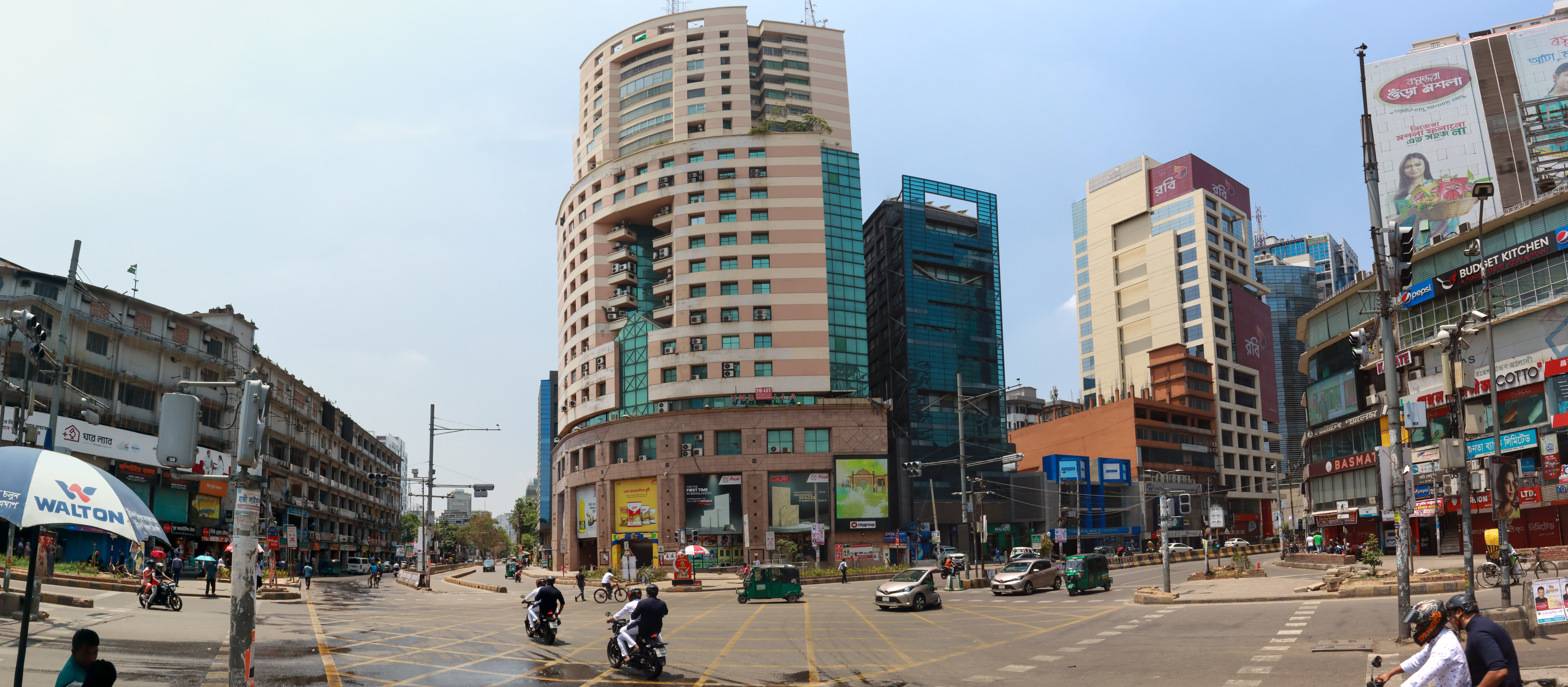
In front road of Navana Tower

== See also ==
- List of tallest buildings in Bangladesh
- List of tallest buildings in Dhaka
