= Doreen Tower =

Hotel building in Dhaka, Bangladesh

- ডোরিন টাওয়ার
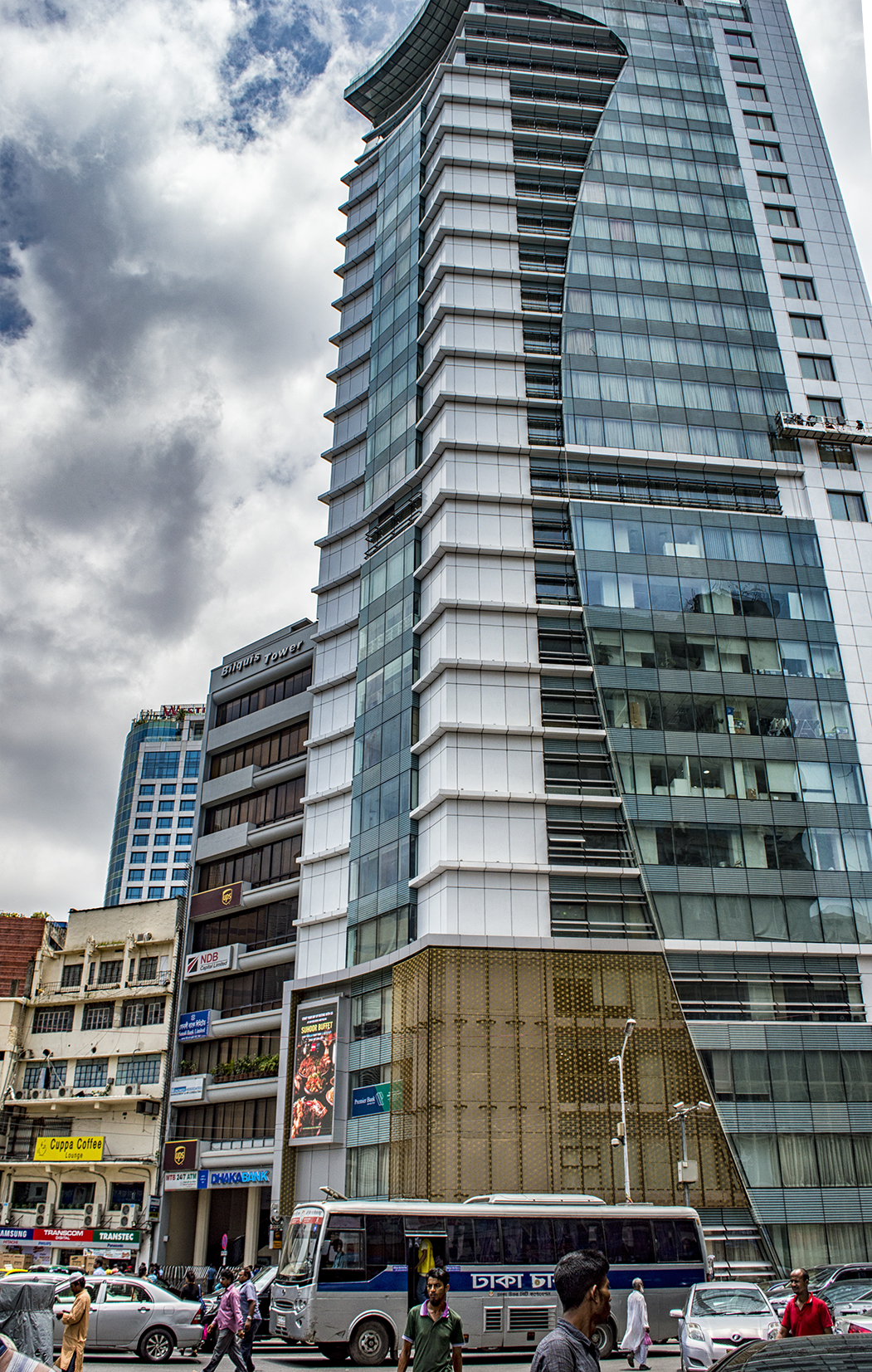
- Interactive map of the Doreen Tower area

General information
- Status: Completed
- Type: Office; Luxury Hotel
- Location: Gulshan, 6-A North Avenue, Gulshan-2, Dhaka-1212, Bangladesh
- Coordinates: 23.7944°N 90.4138°E
- Completed: 2013

Height
- Architectural: 112 m (367 ft)

Technical details
- Floor count: 25 (2 basement)
- Floor area: 151,275 sq ft (14,054 m^{2})

Design and construction
- Developer: Doreen Developments Ltd

Doreen Tower is a high-rise skyscraper centered in the Gulshan-2 circle of Dhaka. The 25-story building has a height of 112 meters (367 feet), and is the 11th tallest building in Bangladesh. It comprises the luxury hotel Four Points by Sheraton.

== History ==
Rajdhani Unnayan Kartripakkha (RAJUK), the public authority responsible for overseeing urban development in Dhaka, approved the building plans in January 1998. Their approval came despite the fact that the building is twice the height allowed for the area, does not have the required setback, provides less than a third of the required parking, and lacks mandatory fire safety measures, including a fire-protected emergency staircase, fire fighting lift, and shelter space.

== See also ==
- List of tallest buildings in Bangladesh
- List of tallest buildings in Dhaka
