= Aziz Court Imperial =

- আজিজ কোর্ট ইম্পেরিয়াল
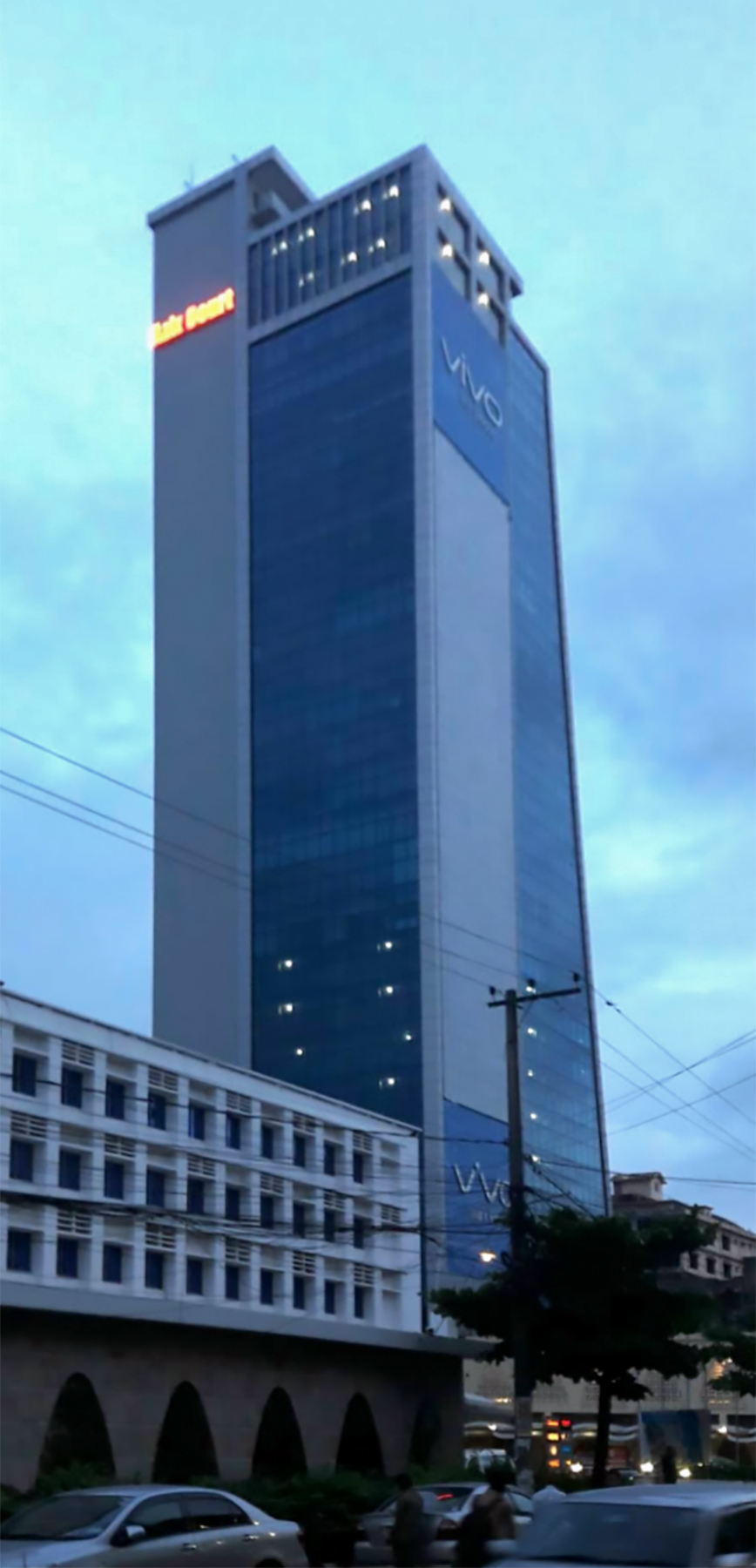
- Aziz Court Imperial 2019
- Interactive map of the Aziz Court Imperial area

General information
- Status: Completed
- Type: Office
- Location: 1413/1414 Commerce College Road, Chittagong 4100 Commerce College Road, Chittagong 4100, Bangladesh, Agrabad, Chittagong, Bangladesh
- Coordinates: 22.3283989°N 91.8149382°E
- Owner: Aziz Group

Height
- Architectural: 112 metres (367 ft)
- Tip: 112 metres (367 ft)

Technical details
- Floor count: 29

Design and construction
- Developer: Aziz Group

Aziz Court Imperial is a high-rise building in Chittagong, Bangladesh. It is Located in Agrabad, the central business district. It rises to a height of 112 metres (367 ft) and has 29 floors. The construction of this building started in 2014 and was completed in 2017. It is the tallest building in Chittagong and the fifth tallest in Bangladesh.

== See also ==
- List of tallest buildings in Bangladesh
- List of tallest buildings in Chittagong
