= Bangladesh Shilpa Bank Bhaban =

Coordinates: 23.7281°N 90.4147°E

- Interactive map of the Bangladesh Shilpa Bank Bhaban area

General information
- Status: Completed
- Type: commercial office
- Location: 8, Rajuk Avenue, Dhaka, Bangladesh
- Construction started: 1980
- Completed: 1983
- Opening: 1983
- Owner: Bangladesh Shilpa Bank

Height
- Roof: 71 metres (233 ft)
- Top floor: 22

Technical details
- Floor count: 21+(1 Basement)

Design and construction
- Developer: Concord Group

Bangladesh Shilpa Bank Bhaban is a tall high-rise located in Dhaka, Bangladesh. It is located in Motijheel, the central business district of the metropolis. It rises up to a height of 71 metres (233 ft) and comprises a total of 22 floors. It houses the headquarters of Bangladesh Shilpa Bank, the premier financial institution of the country. Bangladesh Shilpa Bank Bhaban is currently the 28th to 32nd tallest building in Dhaka which is constructed by Concord Engineers and Construction Limited, a concern of Concord Group.

== See also ==
- List of tallest buildings in Dhaka
