= Bangladesh Bank Building =

- বাংলাদেশ ব্যাংক ভবন
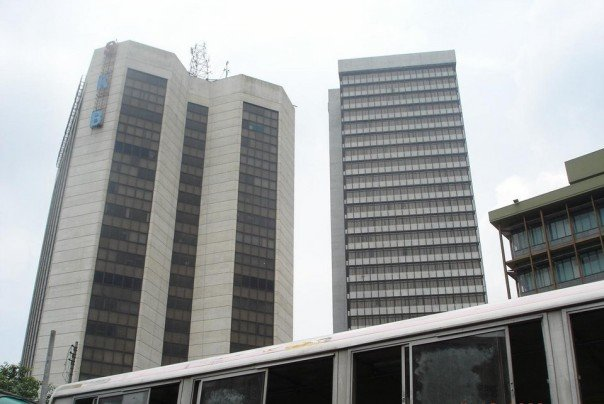
- Bangladesh Bank Building at right

Record height
- Tallest in Bangladesh from 1985 to 2012^{[I]}
- Preceded by: Eastern Federal Credit Union Insurance Building
- Surpassed by: City Centre Dhaka

General information
- Status: Completed
- Type: Head Office
- Location: Toyenbee Road, Hatkhola/হাটখোলা, Dhaka - 1000, Bangladesh, Motijheel, Dhaka, Bangladesh
- Coordinates: 23.7266°N 90.42323°E
- Completed: 1985
- Owner: Bangladesh Bank

Height
- Architectural: 115 metres (377 ft)

Technical details
- Floor count: 31

Design and construction
- Architects: Mohd. Shafiul Quader (MIAB Q-002)
- Architecture firm: Design Associates Limited
- Developer: Bangladesh Bank

Bangladesh Bank Building is a high-rise skyscraper located in Dhaka, Bangladesh. It is located in Motijheel, the central business district. It rises to a height of 115 metres (377 ft) and has 31 floors. It houses the headquarters of Bangladesh Bank. The building is one of the earliest high-rises in the city. Built in 1985, it was the tallest building in Bangladesh for 27 years, until 2012, when City Centre Dhaka Topped-out at 171 metres (561 ft). Currently, the Bangladesh Bank Building is the third to ninth tallest building in Bangladesh.

== See also ==
- List of tallest buildings in Dhaka
- List of tallest buildings in Bangladesh
