= Metropolitan Chamber of Commerce and Industry, Dhaka =

- মেট্রোপলিটন চেম্বার অব কমার্স অ্যান্ড ইন্ড্রাস্ট্রি, ঢাকা
- Formation: 1904
- Type: Non-profit organization
- Legal status: Association
- Purpose: Business advocacy
- Location: Dhaka, Bangladesh
- Region served: Bangladesh
- Key people: Mr. Kamran T. Rahman (President)
- Website: www.mccibd.org
- Formerly called: Narayanganj Chamber of Commerce; Dhaka-Narayanganj Chamber of Commerce; Dhaka-Narayanganj Chamber of Commerce and Industry

Metropolitan Chamber of Commerce and Industry, Dhaka (MCCI), established in 1904, is the oldest trade organization of Bangladesh.

== History, mission and vision ==
MCCI is represented in many Advisory Councils as well as Committees formed by various ministries of Government of Bangladesh. Also maintains effective working relations with development partners like World Bank Group, Asian Development Bank (ADB), Japan External Trade Organization (JETRO), Japan International Cooperation Agency (JICA), Asia Foundation. MCCI has a long history of joint collaboration and corporate understanding. The chamber published regular publications based on Bangladesh's economy and business sector. Also published research report.
