= Shahjadpur =

Neighbourhood in Dhaka Division, Bangladesh

Shahjadpur City (Bengali: শাহজাদপুর) is a neighborhood of Dhaka Division, Bangladesh. Shahjadpur is a city of Dhaka Division. The area of Shahjadpur is surrounded by Shahjadpur Upazila, Dhaka Division, Notunbazar and Khilbarirtek.
