= Radisson Blu Hotel, Chittagong =

Hotel in Bangladesh

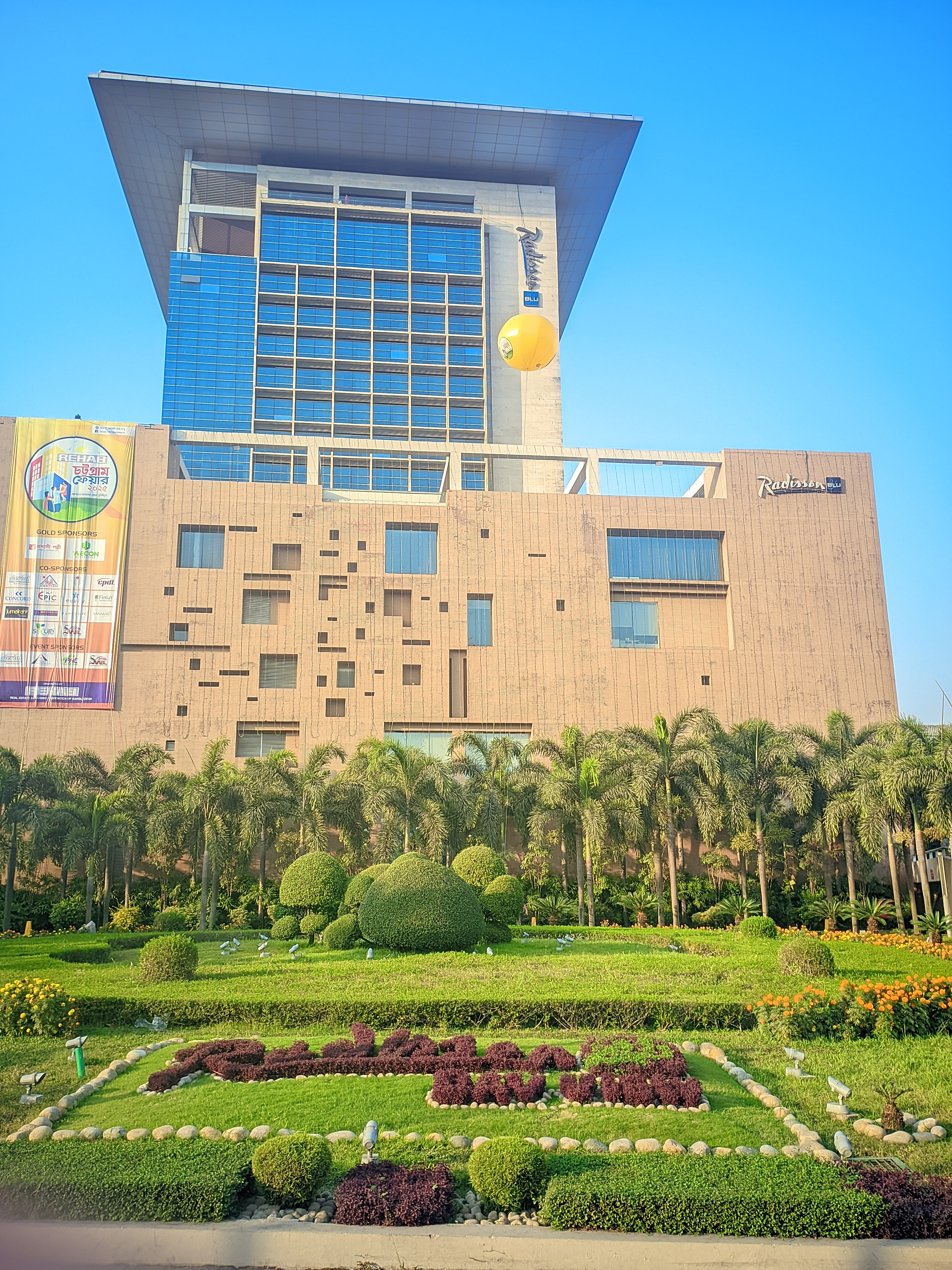
- Front view of the hotel
- Interactive map of the Radisson Blu Hotel, Chittagong area

General information
- Location: Lal Khan Bazar, Chittagong, Bangladesh
- Coordinates: 22.3476°N 91.8231°E
- Opening: April 14, 2015; 10 years ago
- Management: Radisson Hotel Group

Website
- www.radissonblu.com/en/hotel-chittagong

Radisson Blu Hotel, Chittagong is a five-star hotel located in Chittagong, Bangladesh. It is a hotel of Radisson Blu brand owned by Radisson Hotel Group. It is the first five-star hotel in Chittagong.

== History ==
Sena Hotel Development, in partnership with Radisson Hotel Group (formerly known as Carlson Rezidor Hotel Group) took three and a half years to build the hotel. Prime Minister Sheikh Hasina opened the hotel on March 1, 2015, and the hotel opened for customers on April 14, 2015, the first day of Bengali New Year.

== Features ==
The hotel has 241 bedrooms, four international restaurants, three bars, two banquet halls, a swimming pool, an outdoor tennis court and a spa centre.
