= City Centre Dhaka =

Commercial high-rise in Dhaka, Bangladesh

- সিটি সেন্টার ঢাকা
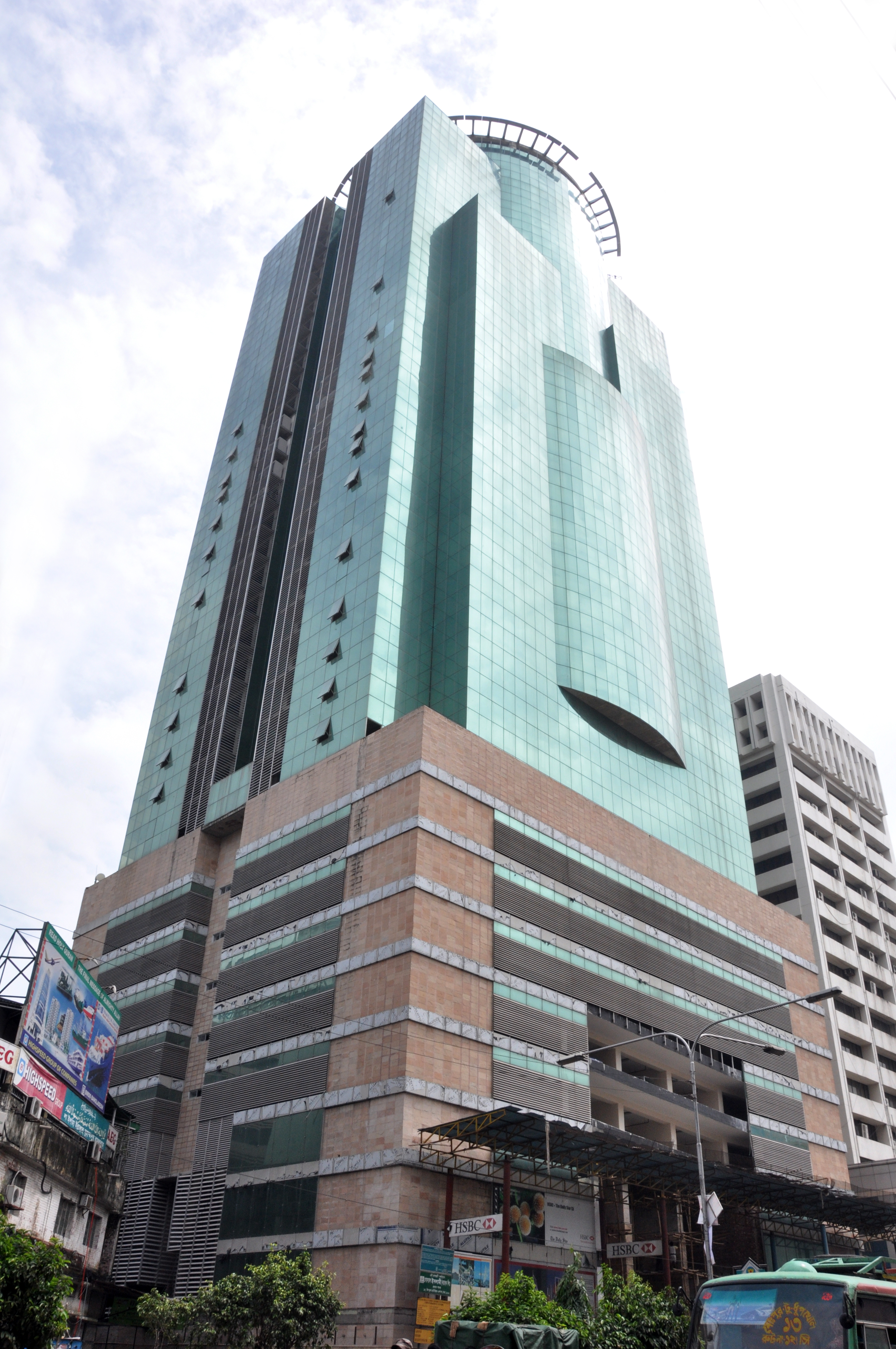
- Alternative names: City Centre Motijheel, City Centre Bangladesh

Record height
- Tallest in Bangladesh from 2012 to 2026^{[I]}
- Preceded by: Bangladesh Bank Building
- Surpassed by: Pinnacle

General information
- Status: Completed
- Type: Office
- Location: 90/1 Motijheel Road, দিলকুশা - Dilkusha, Dhaka - 1000, Bangladesh, Motijheel,, Dhaka, Bangladesh
- Coordinates: 23°43′46″N 90°25′3″E
- Construction started: 21 September 2004
- Topped-out: 2012
- Completed: 31 December 2012
- Opened: 14 April 2013
- Owner: Orion Group (Bangladesh)

Height
- Height: 118 m (387 ft)

Technical details
- Floor count: 37 (10 for parking)
- Floor area: 482,413 sq ft (44,817.6 m^{2})

Design and construction
- Developer: Orion Group

Website
- orion-group.net/city-centre

City Centre Dhaka is a commercial high-rise building located in Motijheel, Dhaka, and is the second tallest building in Bangladesh. It is located at the heart of Motijheel, It rises up to a height of 118 m (387 ft). It topped-out in 2012, and was the tallest building in both Dhaka and Bangladesh until the Pinnacle was topped out in 2025, and completed in 2026. It has 37 floors, ten of which are devoted to parking.

== Facilities ==
The building houses a small indoor convention center and recreational area, as well as a wide atrium filled with greenery. The building is constructed for commercial use but is open to the public. City Centre features 'Glasshouse', a premier restaurant open to the city. There used to be a Krispy Kreme store at ground floor.

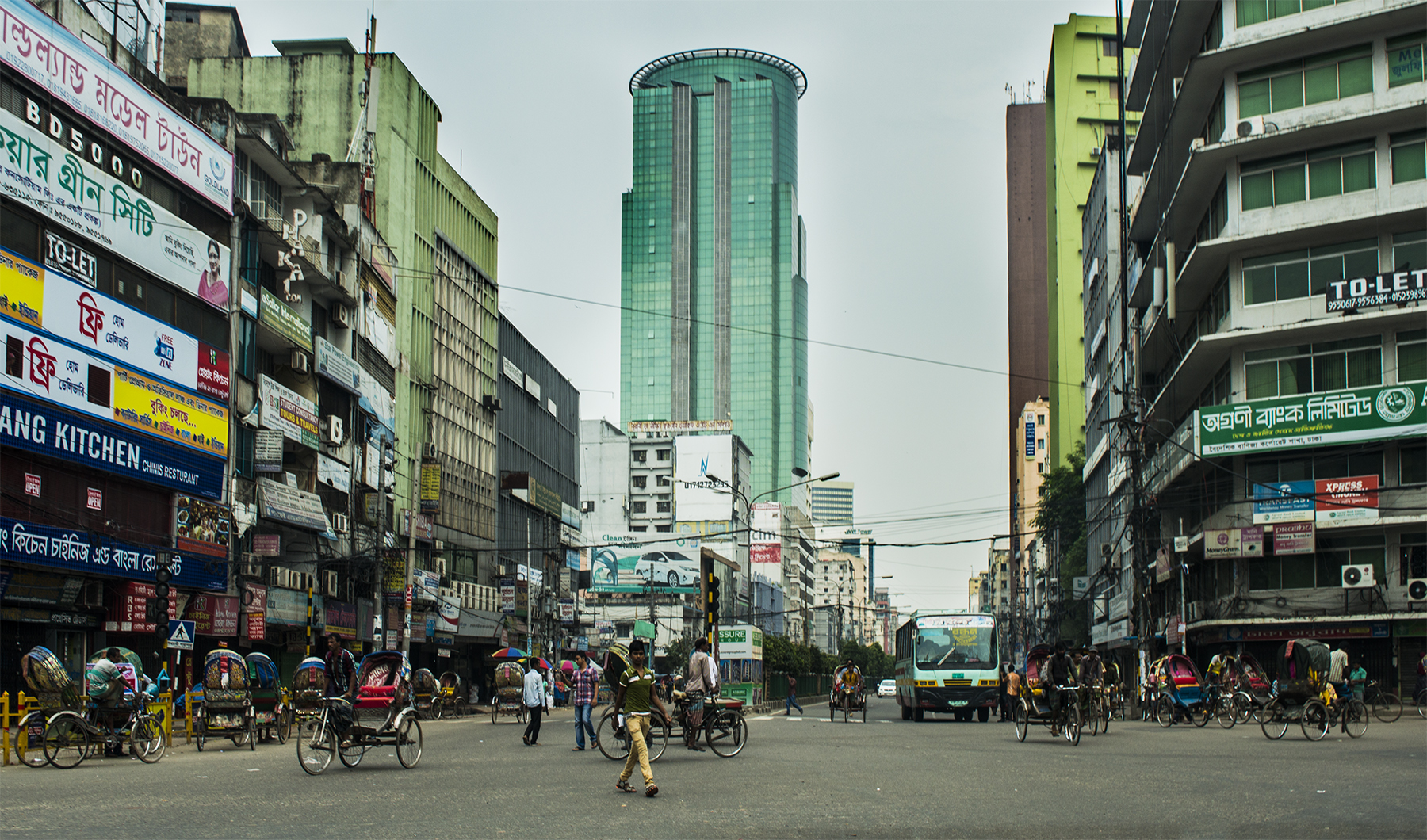

== See also ==
- List of tallest buildings in Bangladesh
- List of tallest buildings in Dhaka
- List of tallest buildings and structures in the Indian subcontinent
- List of tallest buildings and structures in the world by country
