= TA Tower =

Skyscraper in Dhaka, Bangladesh

Tropical TA Tower
- ট্রপিক্যাল টিএ টাওয়ার
- Former names: Tropical Ayesha Millennium Tower

General information
- Status: Under construction
- Location: 468, DIT Road, Malibagh, Dhaka, Bangladesh
- Construction started: 2024
- Completed: 2029
- Owner: Tropical Homes Ltd.

Height
- Height: 152.4 m (500 ft)

Technical details
- Floor count: B6+G+44
- Floor area: 888,500 sq ft (82,540 m^{2})

Design and construction
- Architecture firm: Dcon Design Studio

Other information
- Parking: 328 total parking spaces

Website
- https://www.tropicalhomesltd.com/projects/ta-tower

Tropical TA Tower is an under-construction 45-storey, 152.4-metre-tall skyscraper in Malibagh, Dhaka, Bangladesh. It is being constructed by Tropical Homes Ltd., a Bangladeshi real estate company based in Dhaka. The Tropical TA Tower lies adjacent to the Motijheel Commercial Area, Dhaka's main financial and commercial district. Once completed, the skyscraper will be one of the tallest buildings in Dhaka. The tower is being constructed on the lands of the now-demolished Malibagh Supermarket.

== Overview ==
The building is expected to feature

- Commercial, office and retail spaces
- A boutique hotel with an open terrace
- Indoor gaming zone
- 3D movie theater
- VR room
- Kids' play area
- Clinic
- Swimming pool and equipped gymnasium
- Sauna and steam room
- Jacuzzi
- Convention hall and rooftop coffee bar
- Observation deck
- Helipad

The building is located at 468, DIT Road, Malibagh and is expected to boast at a total floor area of 888,500 square feet. The expected completion date of this skyscraper is December 2029.
