= Shanta Pinnacle =

Skyscraper in Dhaka, Bangladesh

- শান্তা পিনাকল
- Alternative names: The Pinnacle

Record height
- Tallest in Bangladesh since 2026^{[I]}
- Preceded by: City Centre Dhaka

General information
- Status: Completed
- Type: Commercial
- Location: 190/A, Bir Uttam Mir Shawkat Sarak, Tejgaon Industrial Area, Dhaka, Bangladesh
- Coordinates: 23.7703°N 90.4075°E
- Construction started: 2019
- Completed: 18 April 2026
- Owner: Shanta Holdings

Height
- Height: 152.4 m (500 ft)

Technical details
- Floor count: 40
- Floor area: 62,155 m^{2} (669,030 sq ft)
- Lifts/elevators: 8

Design and construction
- Architect: Ehsan Khan (architect)
- Architecture firm: EK Architects

Other information
- Parking: 5 levels

Website
- www.shantapinnacle.com shantaholdings.com/projects/pinnacle

Shanta Pinnacle (Bengali: শান্তা পিনাকল) is a 152.4 m (500 ft) 40-storey commercial skyscraper in Tejgaon I/A, Dhaka, Bangladesh and is the tallest building in both the city and the country. It is the first 40-storey building in Bangladesh and the country's largest skyscraper by GFA, surpassing City Centre Dhaka. Shanta Pinnacle is a record-breaking skyscraper in South Asia, completed in 2026. It's the first skyscraper in South Asia to receive USGBC LEED v4 Platinum Certification under the Core and Shell rating system. Since its completion, it has been South Asia’s greenest skyscraper. Shanta Pinnacle received its LEED Platinum Pre-certification announcement around early August 2022, and later achieved full LEED Platinum Certification (earning 80 points) finalized on July 27, 2026.

Construction of the tower began in July 2019 and was topped out in 2025. It was handed over in 18 April, 2026. The building is owned by Shanta Holdings Limited and designed by Ehsan Khan. Shanta Pinnacle is the first skyscraper in Dhaka to undergo a wind tunnel test. It is a LEED Platinum-certified green building that brings together a high-performance double-glazed unitised facade, an intelligent Building Management System.

Notable companies with offices in the building include Japan Tobacco International, BRAC Bank, City Bank, Premier Bank and Haddad Brands.

== See also ==
- List of tallest buildings in Bangladesh
- List of tallest buildings in Dhaka
- List of tallest buildings and structures in the Indian subcontinent
- List of tallest buildings and structures in the world by country
