= Motijheel Thana =

Central business district and Thana in Dhaka South City Corporation, Bangladesh

Motijheel Thana মতিঝিল থানা
- Central business district and Thana
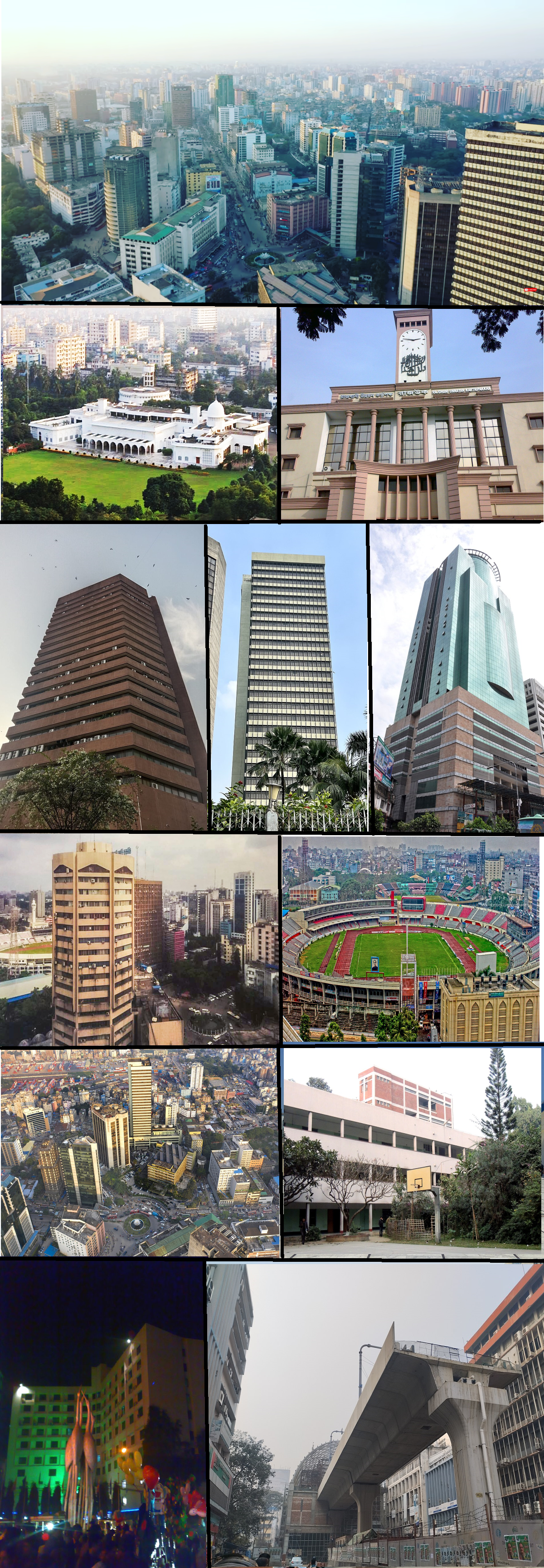
- From top: Skyline of Motijheel, Bangabhaban, RAJUK, Janata Bank Tower, Bangladesh Bank Building, City Centre Dhaka, Jiban Bima Tower and Bangladesh Development Bank, National Stadium, Shapla Square, Notre Dame College, Balaka Square, Motijheel metro station
- Expandable map of vicinity of Motijheel Thana
- Coordinates: 23.72681°N 90.42163°E
- Country: Bangladesh
- Division: Dhaka Division
- District: Dhaka District
- Established as a thana: 1976

Area
  - Total: 3.69 km^{2} (1.42 sq mi)
- Elevation: 23 m (75 ft)

Population (2022)
  - Total: 83,557
  - Density: 22,600/km^{2} (58,600/sq mi)
- Time zone: UTC+6 (BST)
- Postal code: 1000
- Area code: 02

Motijheel (Bengali: মতিঝিল, lit. 'Pearl Lake'; Bengali pronunciation: [motidʒʱil]) is a central business district and a thana of Dhaka, Bangladesh. It is Dhaka's primary central business district, and also the nation's largest commercial and financial hub. Motijheel, located immediately adjacent to Dhaka's zero point, has the largest number of offices in Dhaka. Motijheel CBD also has one of the highest concentrations of high-rise buildings in Bangladesh. It has thus earned the title of the downtown and city centre of Dhaka, as well as the bankpara (neighbourhood of banks) in Bengali.

It is home to the Bangabhaban presidential palace, the venerable Notre Dame College; and the Bangladesh Bank, the central bank of the country.

Companies based in Motijheel include Dutch Bangla Bank, Eastern Bank PLC, Mercantile Bank, IFIC Bank, Beacon Pharmaceuticals, Orion Group, Janata Bank, Sonali Bank, Rupali Bank, Agrani Bank, Pubali Bank, Bangladesh Chemical Industries Corporation, Bangladesh Jute Mills Corporation and Jiban Bima Corporation among others. The Metropolitan Chamber of Commerce and Industry is also based in Motijheel. It is this concentration of businesses and government offices that makes Motijheel a major central business district and an office hub.

The area is served by the Dhaka Metro Rail. Shapla Square and Balaka Square are well known roundabouts in Motijheel.

== Etymology ==
The name Motijheel is a combination of two Bengali words, moti (Bengali: মতি), which means pearl; and jheel (Bengali: ঝিল), meaning lake. Hence, the name Motijheel literally means "Lake of Pearls".

There are two theories regarding the origin of its name. One theory suggests that during Mughal rule, a pond existed within the estate of the Mughal official Mirza Mohammad Mukim, whose daughter is said to have thrown her jewellery into it, giving rise to the name Motijheel. Another theory attributes the name to a canal that once flowed nearby, influencing the area's name.

== History ==
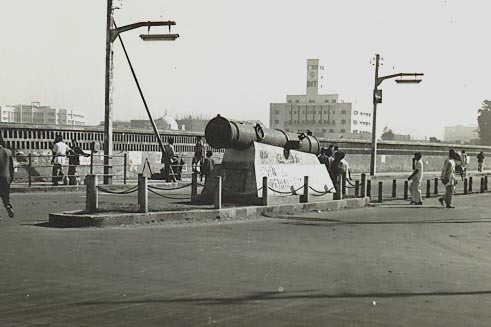
DIT Clocktower and Bibi Mariam Cannon, 1950s

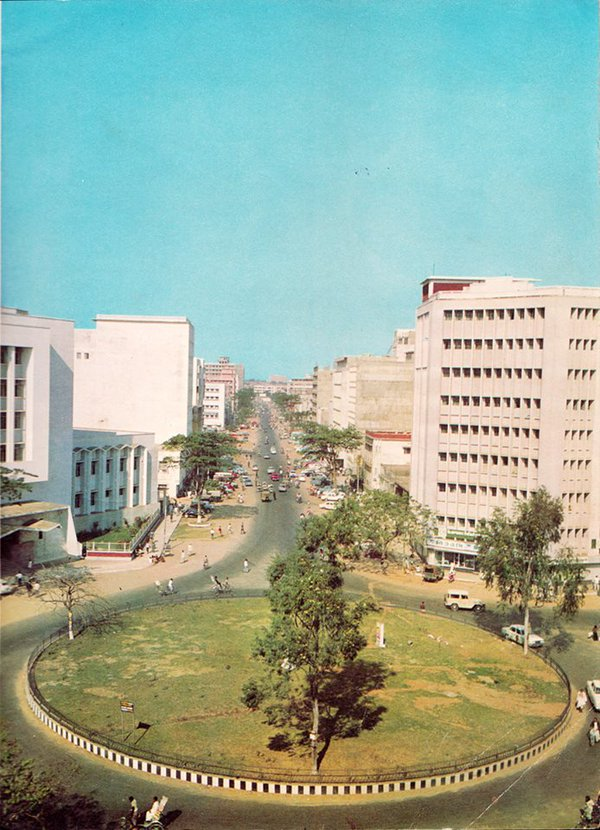
Motijheel in the 1960s

During the Bengal Sultanate, a Sufi preacher named Shah Jalal Dakhini lived in the area. His tomb is located within the Bangabhaban premises. Under Mughal rule, the area was known as the abode of Mirza Muhammad Mukim. The area was historically known as Dilkusha. It was the site of the Dilkusha, Dhaka Gardens, a property of the Nawab of Dhaka. Armenians also lived in the area. The area became home to an official residence of the governor of Bengal and the viceroy of India. It later became the seat of the Governor of East Pakistan. The president of Bangladesh resides at the Bangabhaban in Motijheel. The presidential palace is surrounded by the Bangabhaban Gardens (formerly the Nawab's Gardens, Dilkusha, Dhaka).

After the partition of India, Motijheel became the CBD of Dhaka during the 1950s and 1960s. The city's Notre Dame College was relocated to its present campus in Motijheel in 1954; and includes many prestigious alumni. The clocktower of the Dhaka Improvement Trust building was the tallest structure in East Pakistan. The Purbani Hotel opened in the 1960s. In the 1980s and early 1990s, several tall buildings were built in Motijheel. They are mainly the headquarters of Bangladeshi state-owned banks. For many years, the Bangladesh Bank Building located in Motijheel was the tallest building in Bangladesh. City Centre Dhaka of Motijheel was the tallest building in Bangladesh from 2012 to 2025, when it was surpassed by Pinnacle in Tejgaon Industrial Area. In recent years, the emergence of a plethora of new CBDs in other parts of Dhaka has led to a neglect of Motijheel.

== Geography ==
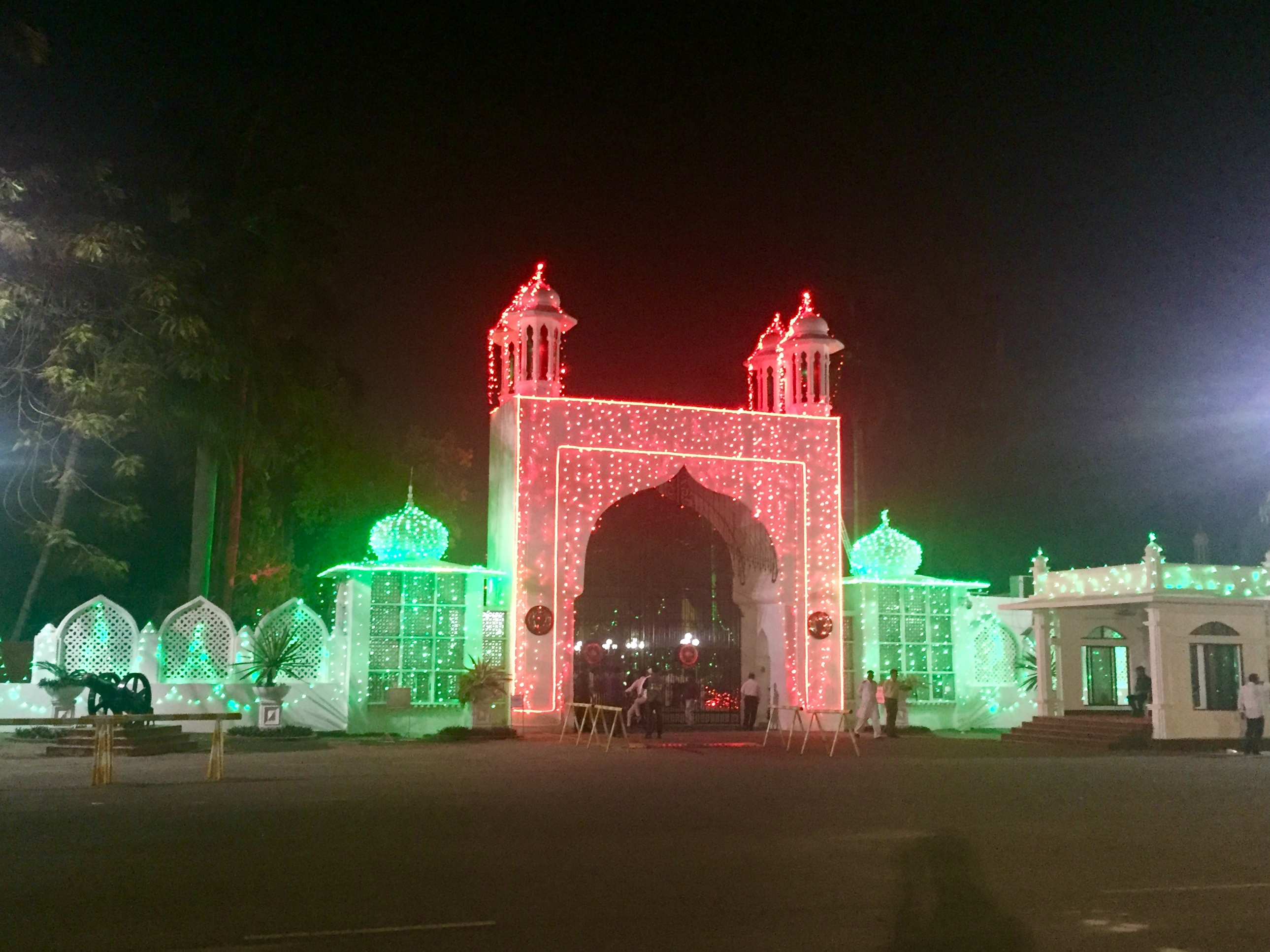
Bangabhaban Gate on 26 March 2018

Motijheel forms part of downtown Dhaka. It is situated between Old Dhaka to its south and Ramna, Paltan and Segunbagicha to its north. Motijheel lies directly adjacent to Paltan and Segunbagicha. The Ramna area was the colonial part of Dhaka which developed in the early 20th century. Motijheel, which was once the property of the nawab of Dhaka, was a garden situated between Ramna and Old Dhaka. Motijheel Thana covers an area of 3.69 square kilometres (1.42 sq mi). It is bounded by thana of Rampura to the north, Khilgaon Thana to the north and east, Sutrapur Thana to the south, Sabujbagh Thana to the east, Ramna Model Thana to the northwest, and Paltan to the west.

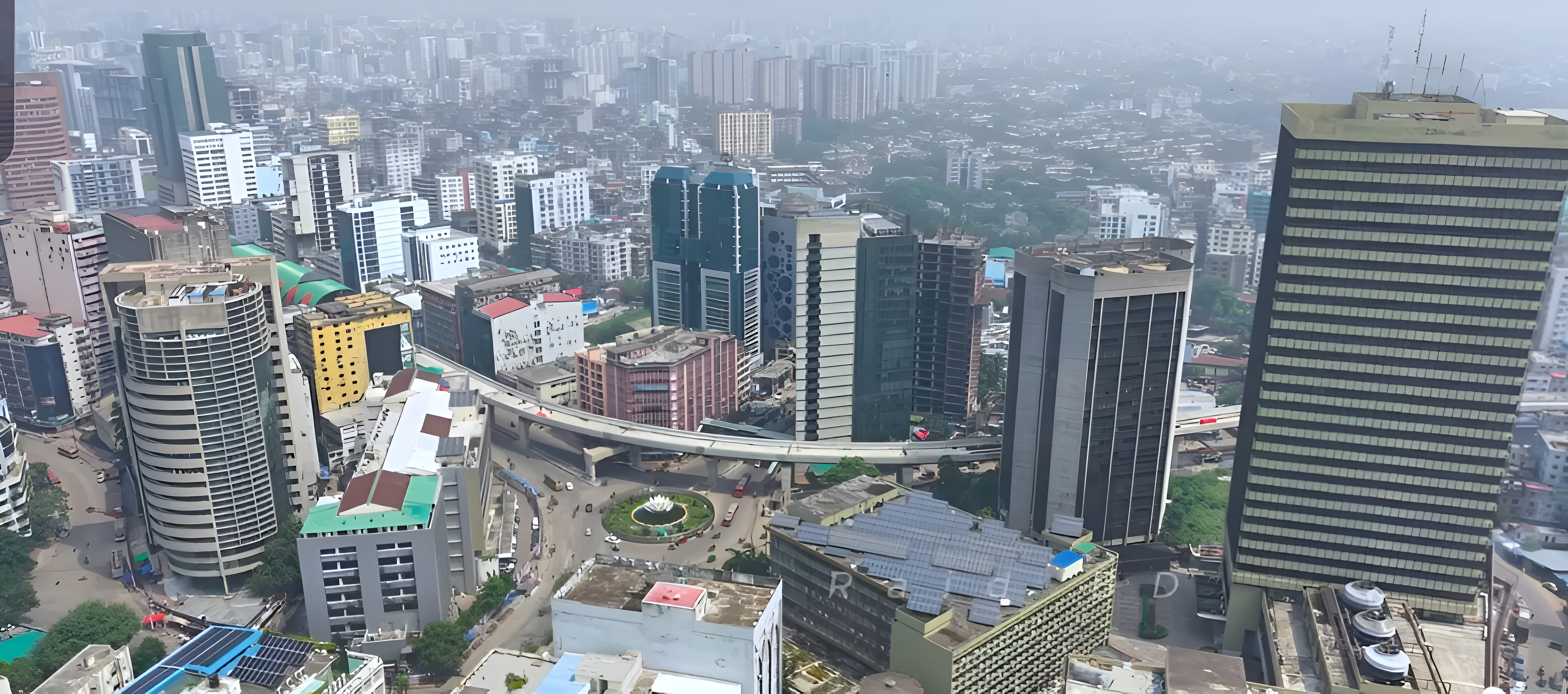
Motijheel, the old downtown of Dhaka

== Demographics ==
Religions in Motijheel Thana (2022)
Religion	Percent
Islam	94.18%
Hinduism	5.38%
Other or not stated	0.45%

According to the 2022 Bangladeshi census, Motijheel Thana had 22,441 households and a population of 83,588. 5.42% of the population were under 5 years of age. Motijheel had a literacy rate (age 7 and over) of 90.16%: 91.79% for males and 87.21% for females, and a sex ratio of 173.80 males for every 100 females.

According to the 2011 Census of Bangladesh, Motijheel Thana has a population of 210,006 with an average household size of 4.5 members and an average literacy rate of 80.4% against the national average of 51.8%.

== Economy ==
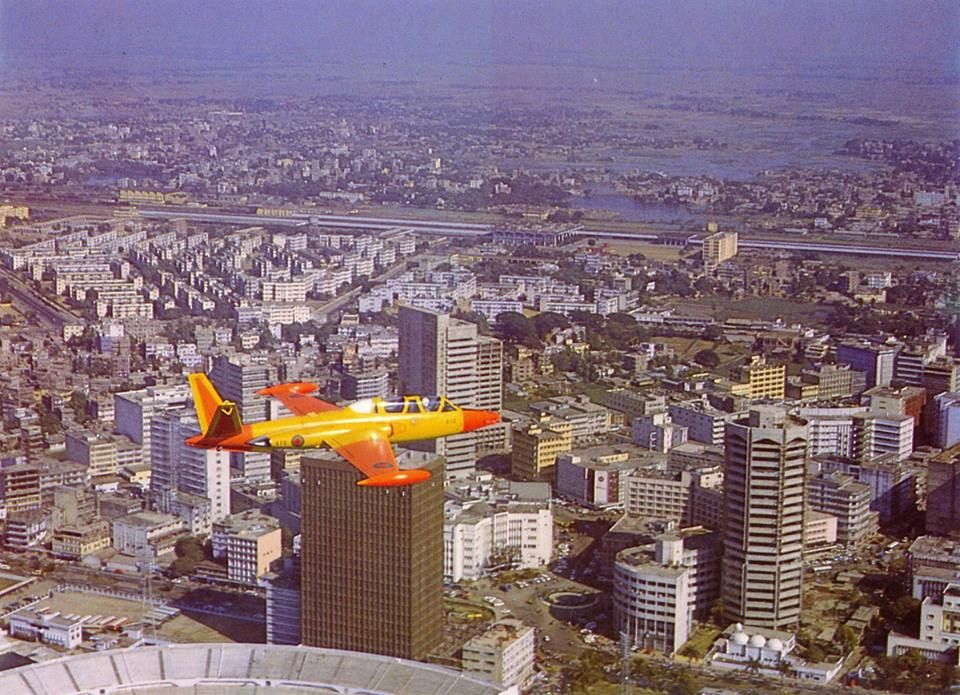
A Bangladesh Air Force trainer aircraft flies over Motijheel in the 1980s

The following companies have their head offices located in Motijheel.

=== State owned companies ===
- Janata Bank
- Sonali Bank
- Agrani Bank
- Pubali Bank
- Rupali Bank
- Bangladesh Development Bank
- Bangladesh Krishi Bank
- Bangladesh Jute Mills Corporation
- Bangladesh Chemical Industries Corporation
- Army Welfare Trust
- Jiban Bima Corporation
- Sadharan Bima Corporation

=== Private sector companies ===
- Dutch Bangla Bank
- Eastern Bank PLC. (Bangladesh)
- Mercantile Bank (Bangladesh)
- IFIC Bank
- Social Islami Bank Limited
- Fareast Islami Life Insurance Company Limited
- NCC Bank
- BASIC Bank Limited
- Islami Bank
- Southeast Bank
- Orion Group
- Beacon Pharmaceuticals
- MetLife

=== Chambers of commerce ===
- Metropolitan Chamber of Commerce and Industry, Dhaka
- Dhaka Chamber of Commerce and Industry
- Federation of Bangladesh Chambers of Commerce and Industries (FBCCI)

== Education ==
Notre Dame College, Dhaka and Notre Dame University Bangladesh are located in Motijheel Thana. The main branch of Ideal School & College and Motijheel Model School & College are also located in Motijheel. T & T High School and the Ideal Government Primary School are also in Motijheel. Other schools and colleges in the thana include Bangladesh Bank High School, Post Office High School, Motijheel Government Girls' High School, Motijheel Government Boys' High School, Shantibagh High School, Shahjahanpur Railway School, Miraj Abbas Degree College, and Abujar Ghifari College.

== See also ==
- Agrabad
- Thanas of Bangladesh
- Administrative geography of Bangladesh
