= Tejgaon Industrial Area Thana =

Thana in Dhaka North City Corporation, Bangladesh

Tejgaon Industrial Area Thana তেজগাঁও শিল্প এলাকা
- Thana
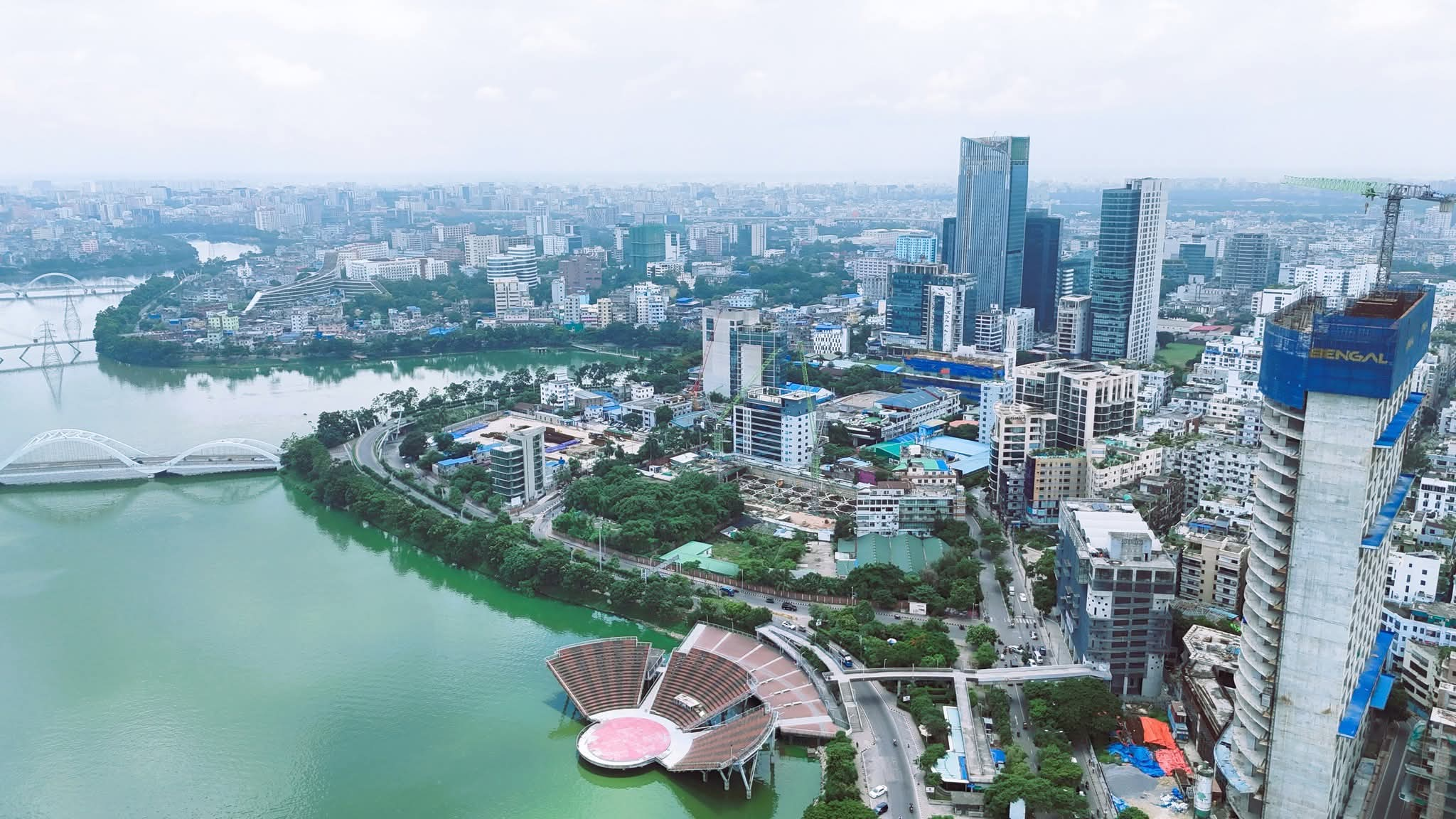
- Skyline of Tejgaon
- Expandable map of vicinity of Tejgaon Industrial Area Thana
- Location of Tejgaon Industrial Area Thana within Dhaka Location of Tejgaon Industrial Area Thana within Dhaka Division Location of Tejgaon Industrial Area Thana within Bangladesh
- Coordinates: 23.76418°N 90.40566°E
- Country: Bangladesh
- Division: Dhaka Division
- District: Dhaka District
- Established as a thana: 2006

Area
  - Total: 4.38 km^{2} (1.69 sq mi)
- Elevation: 23 m (75 ft)

Population (2022)
  - Total: 108,650
  - Density: 33,500/km^{2} (87,000/sq mi)
- Time zone: UTC+6 (BST)
- Postal code: 1208
- Area code: 02

Tejgaon Industrial Area Thana is a Thana of Dhaka District in the Division of Dhaka, Bangladesh that was formed in 2006.

== Geography ==
Tejgaon Industrial Area Thana is bounded by Gulshan Thana on the north, Ramna Thana and Tejgaon Thana on the south, Gulshan Thana, Rampura Thana and Ramna Thana on the east and Tejgaon Thana and Cantonment Thana on the west. The thana has a total land area of 4.38 square kilometres (1.69 mi^{2}).

== Demographics ==
Religions in Tejgaon Shilpa Elaka Thana (2022)
Religion	Percent
Islam	96.82%
Hinduism	2.86%
Other or not stated	0.32%

According to the 2022 Bangladeshi census, Tejgaon Shilpa Elaka Thana had 30,620 households and a population of 108,661. 6.49% of the population were under 5 years of age. Tejgaon Shilpa Elaka had a literacy rate (age 7 and over) of 84.92%: 86.40% for males and 82.41% for females, and a sex ratio of 162.72 males for every 100 females.

According to 2011 Census of Bangladesh, Tejgaon Industrial Area Thana has a population of 146,732 with average household size of 4.2 members, and an average literacy rate of 70.7% vs national average of 51.8% literacy.

== See also ==
- Upazilas of Bangladesh
- Districts of Bangladesh
- Divisions of Bangladesh
