= Timeline of Dhaka =

The following is a timeline of the history of the city of Dhaka, Bangladesh.

== Prior to 19th century ==
- 8th century CE – Dhaka part of Pala Empire.
- 1095 – Senas in power.
- 1457 – Binat Bibi Mosque constructed.
- 1459 – Gate built.
- 1580s – Portuguese merchants open the first European trading post in Dhaka.
- 1610 – City renamed Jahangirnagar; becomes capital of Bengal; Mughal Islam Khan in power.
- 1639 – Capital relocated from Dhaka to Rajmahal.
- 1640 – Mughal Eidgah mosque built.
- 1642 – Hussaini Dalan (mosque) built.
- 1645 – Bara Katra (caravansary) built.
- 1646 – Navaratna temple built (approximate date).
- 1649 – Lalbagh Fort mosque built.
- 1659 – Capital relocated to Dhaka from Rajmahal.
- 1660 – Pagla bridge built on Dacca-Narayangaj road (approximate date).
- 1682 – 25 October: William Hedges, the first Agent and Governor of East India Company in the Bay of Bengal, arrived Dhaka.
- 1663 – Choto Katra (caravansary) built.
- 1668 – English Factory built.
- 1676 – Chowk Bazaar Shai Mosque built.
- 1677 – Holy Rosary Church built by Portuguese.
- 1678 – Lalbagh palace construction begins.
- 1679 – Shahbaz Khan Mosque and Khan Mohammad Mridha Mosque built.
- 1696
  - Mosque of Haji Kahjeh Shahabag built in Ramne (approximate date).
  - Jayakali temple and Siva temple built in Thatari Bazar (approximate date).
- 1704 – Murshid Quli Khan residence relocates from Dhaka to Murshidabad.
- 1717 – Khan Muhammad Ali Khan becomes deputy governor.
- 1723 – Itisam Khan becomes deputy governor.
- 1728 – Mirza Lutfullah becomes deputy governor.
- 1756 – Jasarat Khan becomes deputy governor.
- 1765
  - British East India Company in power.
  - Population: 450,000 (estimate).
- 1781 – Armenian Church built.
- 1793 – Laxmi Narayan Mandir (temple) built.
- 1800 – Population: 200,000 (estimate).

== 19th century ==
- 1815
  - Catholic church built.
  - Lunatic Asylum founded.
- 1819 – St. Thomas Church built.
- 1825 – Population: 150,000 (approximate).
- 1830
  - Iron suspension bridge constructed across Dullye Creek.
  - Gurdwara Nanak Shahi built.
  - Population: 66,989.
- 1834 – Ghaziuddin Haider becomes deputy governor.
- 1835 – Dhaka Collegiate School established.
- 1840 – Population bottoms out at 50,000.
- 1846 – Union School is established to give the poor an English education.
- 1850 – Catholic Apostolic Vicariate of Eastern Bengal established.
- 1857 – Uprising of sepoys.
- 1858
  - City becomes part of British Raj.
  - Mitford Hospital established.
- 1864 – 1 August: Dacca Municipality established.
- 1866 – Langar Khana (almshouse) founded.
- 1872 – Population: 69,212.
- 1874 – Madrasa established.
- 1875 – Medical school established.
- 1876 – Dhaka Survey School is established to teach surveying and road building in the vernacular.
- 1878
  - Water-works in operation.
  - Eden Girls' College established.
- 1880 – Northbrook Hall built.
- 1881 – Population: 79,076.
- 1882 – St Gregory's School founded.
- 1883 – Jagannth College founded. (Now Jagannath University)
- 1885 – Revenue service begins on the Narayanganj-Dhaka portion of the Dacca State Railway.
- 1886 – Mymensingh-Dhaka railway opens.
- 1888
  - April: Tornado.
  - Ahsan Manzil (Pink Palace) rebuilt.
- 1892 – 16 March: Jeanette Rummary (as Jeanette Van Tassell) makes the first balloon ascension and parachute jump in Dhaka's history as a member of a travelling aerial exhibition led by Park Van Tassel.
- 1897 – 12 June: Earthquake.

== 20th century ==
=== 1900s–1960s ===
- 1901 – Population: 90,542; district of Dacca: 2,649,522.
- 1902 – April: Tornado.
- 1904 – Curzon Hall built.
- 1905 – City becomes capital of newly formed East Bengal and Assam province.
- 1906 – December: All India Muhammadan Educational Conference held.
- 1909 – Baldha Garden laid out.
- 1911 – Dhaka Club organized.
- 1918 – Influenza outbreak.
- 1921 – University of Dhaka established.
- 1946 – Dhaka Medical College established.
- 1947 – City becomes capital of East Bengal, a province of newly independent Pakistan.
- 1949 – All Pakistan Women's Association East Pakistan Branch organized.
- 1951
  - Habib Productions theatre troupe active.
  - Area of city: 85 square kilometers.
  - Population: 411,279.
- 1952 – Asiatic Society organized.
- 1953 – Holy Family Hospital built.
- 1954
  - Dhaka Stock Exchange incorporated.
  - Dacca Stadium and New Market built.
- 1955
  - City becomes capital of East Pakistan.
  - Bangla Academy established.
- 1956
  - Drama Circle active.
  - RAJUK Bhaban built.
- 1959 – Alliance Française de Dhaka founded.
- 1960 – Islamia Eye Hospital and Cholera Research Hospital founded.
- 1961 – Tejgaon College established.
- 1964 – Bangabhaban reconstructed.
- 1965 – Institute of Postgraduate Medicine and Research and Jinnah College founded.
- 1967 – Officers' Club established.
- 1968
  - Protests against Ayub Khan regime.
  - Baitul Mukarram (mosque) built.

=== 1970s–1990s ===
- 1970
  - November: Bhola cyclone.
  - Jiraz Art Gallery in business.
- 1971
  - 7 March: Sheikh Mujibur Rahman speaks at Ramna Race Course Maidan.
  - 25 March: Bangladesh Liberation War begins; Dhaka University massacre.
  - 27 March: Ramna Kali Mandir (temple) razed.
  - 16 December: Instrument of Surrender signed.
  - City becomes capital of the People's Republic of Bangladesh.
  - The Bangladesh Observer newspaper in publication.
- 1972
  - Ekushey Book Fair begins.
  - Dhaka Shishu Hospital established.
  - Abahani Limited sports club formed.
  - Shaheed Minar (monument) rebuilt.
- 1973 – Dhaka Theatre established.
- 1974
  - Abul Hasnat becomes mayor.
  - Dhaka Zoo established.
  - Saju Art Gallery in business.
  - Population: 1,730,253 urban agglomeration.
- 1975
  - Islamic Foundation Bangladesh formed.
  - 15 August: Sheikh Mujibur Rahman is assassinated.
  - 3 November: Awami League leaders killed in Dhaka Central Jail.
- 1976 – Dhaka Metropolitan Police department established.
- 1977 – 2 October: Coup attempt.
- 1980 – School of the Society for Education in Theatre established.
- 1981
  - Bangladesh Group Theatre Federation organized.
  - Area of city: 510 square kilometers.
  - Population: 3,440,147.
- 1982
  - Mahamudul Hassan becomes mayor.
  - Jatiyo Sangshad Bhaban (parliament building) constructed.
  - Mirpur and Gulshan become part of Dhaka municipality.
- 1983 – Bangladesh Shilpa Bank Bhaban built.
- 1985
  - December: South Asian Association for Regional Cooperation summit held.
  - Bangladesh Bank Building and Janata Bank Bhaban constructed.
  - The National Library of Bangladesh moves into a new, purpose-built facility.
- 1986 – Bangladesh Medical College established.
- 1989
  - Maziur Rhaman becomes mayor.
  - Dhaka Pantomime group formed.
- 1990 – Abul Hasnat becomes mayor.
- 1991
  - Mirza Abbas becomes mayor.
  - Daily Star newspaper begins publication.
  - Area of city: 1,353 square kilometers.
  - Population: 6,887,459. (Note: According to the United Nations, population in Dhaka in 1991 was 3,397,187.)
- 1993
  - Independent University, Bangladesh was established.
- 1994
  - Mohammad Hanif becomes mayor.
  - Puppet Development Centre opens.
- 1995
  - Pantapath road and Dhaka Nagar Bhaban constructed.
  - Dhaka Imperial College established.
- 1996 – East West University established.
- 1998 – Prothom Alo newspaper begins publication.
- 1999 – March: D-8 summit held.
- 2000
  - Chobi Mela International Photography Festival begins.
  - Bengal Gallery of Fine Arts opens.

== 21st century ==
- 2001
  - BRAC University established.
  - Area of city: 1,530 square kilometers.
- 2002
  - Sadeque Hossain Khoka becomes mayor.
  - China Bangladesh Friendship Center built.
- 2004 – Bangabandhu Sheikh Mujibur Rahman Novo Theatre and Bashundhara City (shopping mall) open.
- 2005
  - Jagannath College transformed into Jagannath University
  - Concord Grand built.
- 2008 – Population: 7,000,940.
- 2011
  - Hay Festival begins.
  - Population: 8,906,035.
- 2012
  - April: Demonstration.
  - Dhaka Gladiators cricket team formed.
  - City Centre (building) constructed.
  - City designated a Capital of Islamic Culture.
- 2013
  - Protests in Shahbag.
  - 2013 Savar building collapse.
- 2014 – Air pollution in Dhaka reaches annual mean of 85 PM2.5 and 150 PM10, much higher than recommended.
- 2016 – 1 July: Gulshan attack.
- 2019 – 20 February: Chowk Bazaar fire.
- 2022 – Dhaka Metro Rail opened.

== See also ==
- History of Dhaka
- Dhaka District
- Timeline of Bangladeshi history
- List of cities proper by population density

== Bibliography ==
=== Published in 19th century ===
- Charles D'Oyly; John Landseer (1814). Antiquities of Dacca. London. OCLC 27939924.
- Jedidiah Morse; Richard C. Morse (1823), "Dacca", A New Universal Gazetteer (4th ed.), New Haven: S. Converse
- John B. Seely (1825). "(Dacca)". Road Book of India; or, East Indian Traveller's Guide. London: Richardson.
- James Taylor (1840), "The City", A Sketch of the Topography & Statistics of Dacca, Calcutta: G.H. Huttmann, Military Orphan Press
- J.H. Stocqueler (1854), "Dacca", Hand-book of British India (3rd ed.), London: Allen and Co.
- "Dacca". Street's Indian and Colonial Mercantile Directory for 1870. London: Street. 1870.
- William Wilson Hunter (1875), "Dacca City", Statistical Account of Bengal, London: Trübner
- "Dhakah", Handbook of the Bengal Presidency, London: J. Murray, 1882, OCLC 2093946
- Edward Balfour (1885), "Dacca", Cyclopaedia of India (3rd ed.), London: B. Quaritch
- William Wilson Hunter (1885), "Dacca", Imperial Gazetteer of India (2nd ed.), London: Trübner
- Government of Bengal, Public Works Department (1896). List of Ancient Monuments in the Dacca Division. Calcutta: Bengal Secretariat Press.
- Joachim Hayward Stocqueler (1900), "Dacca", The Oriental Interpreter and Treasury of East India Knowledge, London: Cox

=== Published in 20th century ===
- "Dacca", Chambers's Encyclopaedia, London: W. & R. Chambers, 1901
- F. B. Bradley-Birt (1906), The Romance of an Eastern Capital, London: Smith, Elder, & Co., OCLC 14390376, OL 6992126M
- "Dacca", Imperial Gazetteer of India, Oxford: Clarendon Press, 1908, p. 116+
- "Dacca" . Encyclopædia Britannica. Vol. 7 (11th ed.). 1910. pp. 725–726.
- Basil Copleston Allen (1912), "Dacca (city)", Dacca, Eastern Bengal District Gazetteers, Allababad: Pioneer Press
- R. Hartmann (1987) [First published 1927]. "Dhaka". E.J. Brill's First Encyclopaedia of Islam, 1913-1936 (Reprint ed.). E.J. Brill. ISBN 90-04-08265-4.
- S.M. Taifoor (1965). Glimpses of Old Dhaka (2nd ed.). OCLC 759626436.
- Sharif Uddin Ahmed (1986). Dacca: A Study in Urban History and Development (1st ed.). London: Curzon Press. ISBN 0-913215-14-7.
- Sharuf Uddin Ahmed, ed. (1991). Dhaka: past present future. Dhaka: Asiatic Society. ISBN 984-512-335-X.
- Schellinger and Salkin, ed. (1996). "Dhaka". International Dictionary of Historic Places: Asia and Oceania. UK: Routledge. ISBN 9781884964046.
- Golam Rabbani (1997). Dhaka, from Mughal outpost to metropolis. Dhaka University Press. ISBN 984-05-1374-5.

=== Published in 21st century ===
- Jane Pryer (2003). Poverty and Vulnerability in Dhaka Slums: The Urban Livelihood Study. Ashgate. ISBN 0-7546-1864-1.
- C. Edmund Bosworth, ed. (2007). "Dacca". Historic Cities of the Islamic World. Leiden: Koninklijke Brill.
- "Dhaka". Grove Encyclopedia of Islamic Art & Architecture. Oxford University Press. 2009.
- Kamal Siddiqui; Kaniz Siddique Jamshed Ahmed (2010). Social Formation in Dhaka, 1985–2005: A Longitudinal Study of Society in a Third World Megacity. England: Ashgate. ISBN 978-1-4094-1103-1.
- Ahsanul Kabir & Bruno Parolin (2012), Planning & Development of Dhaka – A Story of 400 Years – via International Planning History Society
- Willem van Schendel (2009). A History of Bangladesh. Cambridge University Press. ISBN 978-0-521-67974-9.
