= Armanitola =

Area in Dhaka, Bangladesh

Coordinates: 23.714°N 90.402°E

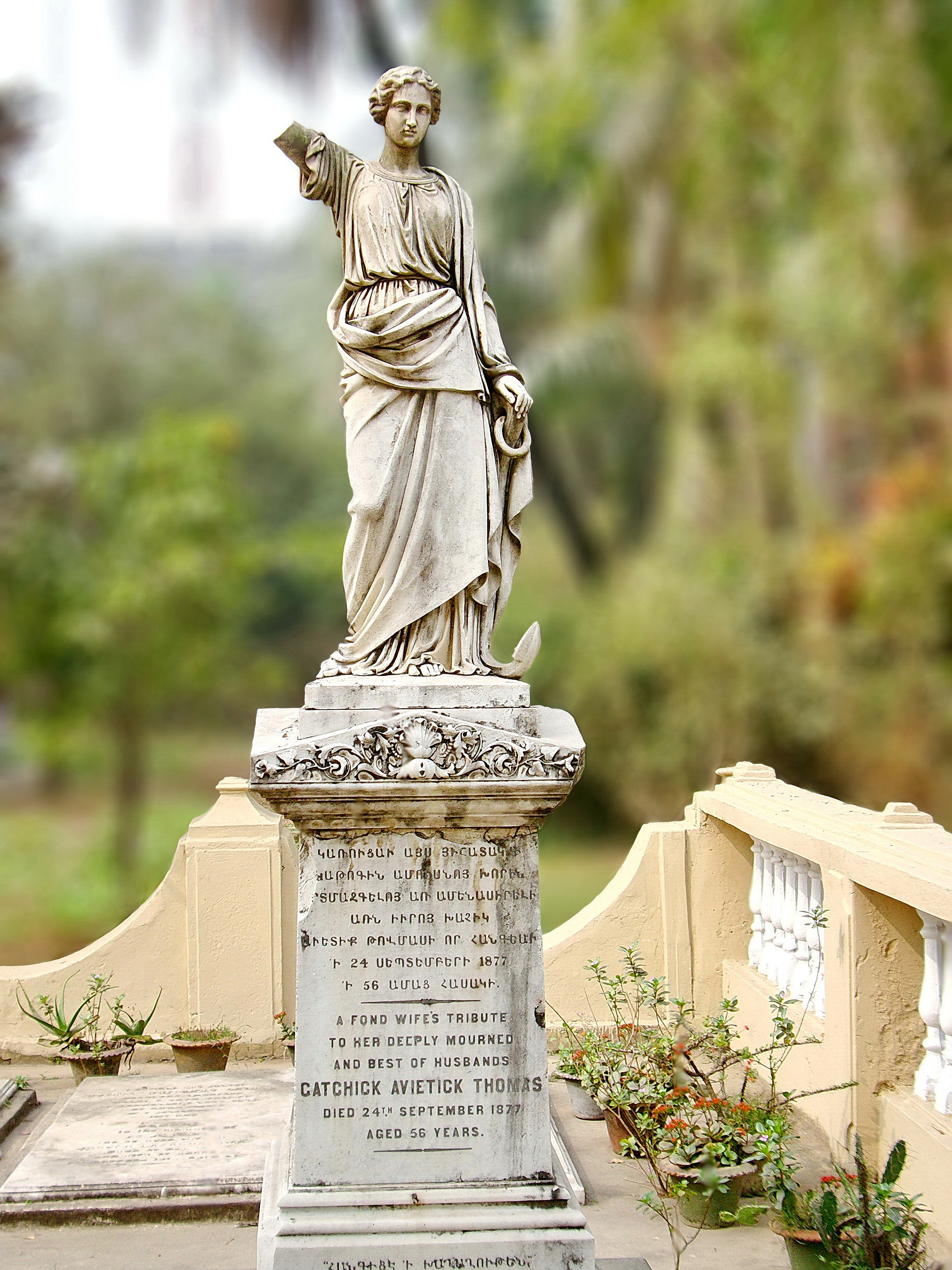
Statue located inside the Armenian Church in Dhaka.

Armanitola (Bengali: আরমানিটোলা) is an area in the old city of Dhaka, the capital and largest city of Bangladesh. The area takes its name from the Armenian settlement that surrounded Armenian church there.

== History ==
The Armenian Church of the Holy Resurrection was built in 1781 as a wooden chapel and was consecrated by Bishop Eprahim. This was around the time the Armenians were settling in Dhaka. The church holds the tombs of 200 Armenians. The tower of the church collapsed in 1897 following an earthquake.

In 1926, the Tara Masjid was renovated and an extension was added. The Turag River used to flow close to the mosque in the 19th century before the river changed its course.

Armanitola Maidan was the site of several public speeches by leaders of the Awami Muslim League in 1949.

The old building of the New Government Girls High School collapsed in October 2007.

The Daily Star reported that three years after the 2010 Dhaka fire which killed 124 people, areas of Old Dhaka, including Armanitola, had warehouses holding flammable chemicals. In 2014, the owners of the Hinga Bibi Masjid, 1 324 year old mosque located on KP Ghosh Road in Armanitola, started demolishing the building to replace it with a multistorey building.

There are two dorms of the Jagannath University in Armanitola which like 10 other dorms of the university are under illegal occupation. Abdur Rahman Hall is occupied by Bangladesh Police and Shaheed Anwar Shafique Hostel was occupied by criminals.

In April 2021, a chemical fire at warehouse killed four and injured 23 others. There is a large number of warehouses, including those storing chemicals, in residential areas in Armanitola. Rapid Action Battalion arrested the two owners of the warehouse.

The residence of Nicholas Pogose, founder of Pogose School and 19th century Armenian merchant, was demolished in Armanitola during the COVID-19 pandemic.

== Administration ==
Armanitola is part of the Dhaka-7 parliamentary constituency. It is represented in parliament by Hamidur Rahman of the BNP.

== Education ==
Armanitola Government High School is the public High School of the area was established in 1904.

== Attractions ==
- Tara Masjid
- List of Armenian ethnic enclaves
