= Kaliprosanna Ghosh =

Bengali journalist, writer and scholar

Dewan Rai Bahadur Kaliprosanna Ghosh CIE Vidyasagar
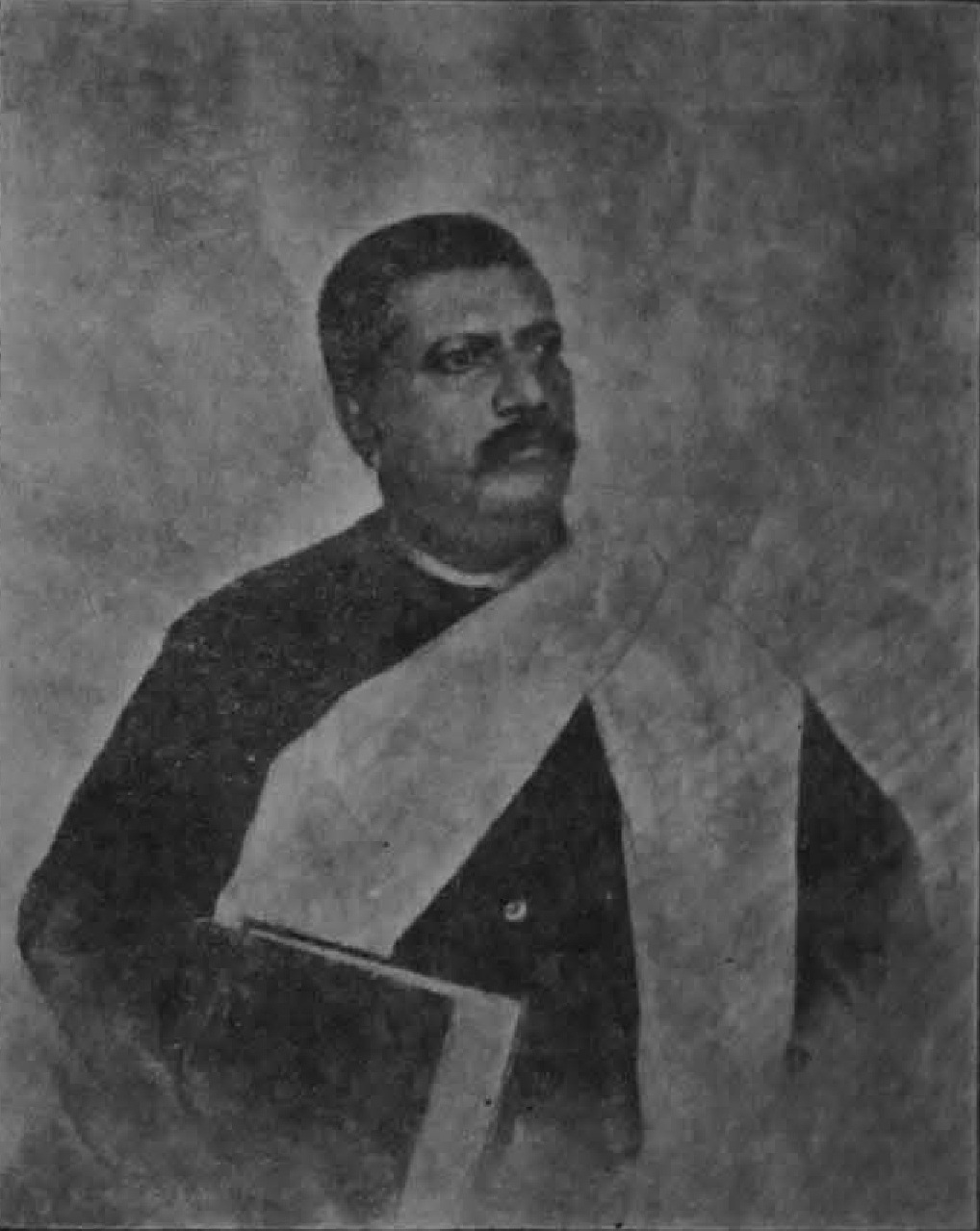
- Portrait of Ghosh
- Born: 23 July 1843; Bharakar, Bikrampur, Bengal Presidency, British India (now in Munshiganj, Bangladesh)
- Died: 29 October 1910 (aged 67); British India
- Education: Dhaka Collegiate School
- Occupations: Journalist and author
- Movement: Bengal Renaissance
- Father: Shibnath Ghosh

Rai Bahadur Dewan Kaliprosanna Ghosh, Vidyasagar was a Bengali journalist, writer and scholar.

== Early life ==
Ghosh was born on 23 July 1843 in the village of Bharakar in Bikrampur, Bengal Presidency, British India to a Bengali Hindu Kayastha father known as Shibnath Ghosh. Kaliprosanna Gosh studied at an English-medium school, at a maktab, and at a Sanskrit school. This enabled him to gain a good grasp in many languages such as English, Bengali, Persian and Sanskrit. He completed his studies at Dhaka Collegiate School. In circa 1863, Ghosh travelled to Bhowanipore where he gave a speech on Christianity. Here, Ghosh was introduced to Debendranath Tagore and soon after joined the Brahmo Samaj. Kaliprosanna Ghosh left 2 son. Roybahadur Satyaprasanna Ghosh & Roybahadur Saradaprasanna Ghosh. Satyaprasanna Ghosh had a daughter. Saradaprasanna left 4 sons: Sunitiprasanna, Debaprasanna, Satishprasanna and Shailajaprasanna. Sunitiprasanna was a great scholar & once owned the prestigious Melody music store of Kolkata city. He had 4 sons Sourishprasanna, Saibalprasanna, Sourinprasanna & Subhashprasanna.

== Career ==
Ghosh started working at the Dhaka Lower Division Court as a bench clerk in 1865. In 1870, he was appointed the editor of Dhaka's Brahmo Samaj journal called Shubhosadhini. He became the editor of Bandhab in 1874, a magazine which was referred to as the second "Bangadarshan". He left his career in the Dhaka court in 1876. In 1877, he was appointed the Dewan of Bhawal Estate for Zamindar Raja Rajendranarayan Roychowdhury. Gobindachandra Das, who worked in the estate, protested against Ghosh's misconduct as Dewan, although Das was dismissed for rebelliously protesting.

Ghosh founded his own society known as the Literary Review Council. He also joined the Bangiya Sahitya Parishad in 1894 and served as its vice-chairman from 1897 to 1910. Ghosh went on to serve as the president of the District Local Board and chairman of the Literary Assembly. He wrote a number of books on philosophy and society. He was awarded the titles of Rai Bahadur, Vidyasagar and Companions of the Order of the Indian Empire. In 1902, he stopped being the Dewan of Bhawal.

== Works ==
- Shongeetmonjori (1872)
- Probhat Chinta (1877)
- Bhrantibinod (1881)
- Nibhrito Chinta (1883)
- Komolkobita (1888)
- Promodolohori (1895)
- Bhoktir Joy (1895)
- Narijatibishoyok Prostab (1896)
- Nisheeth Chinta (1896)
- Maa Na Mohashokti (1905)
- Janokir Ogniporikkha (1905)
- Chhayadorshon (1905)

== Death ==
Ghosh died on 29 July 1910.
