= Armenians in Bengal =

Armenians in Bangladesh
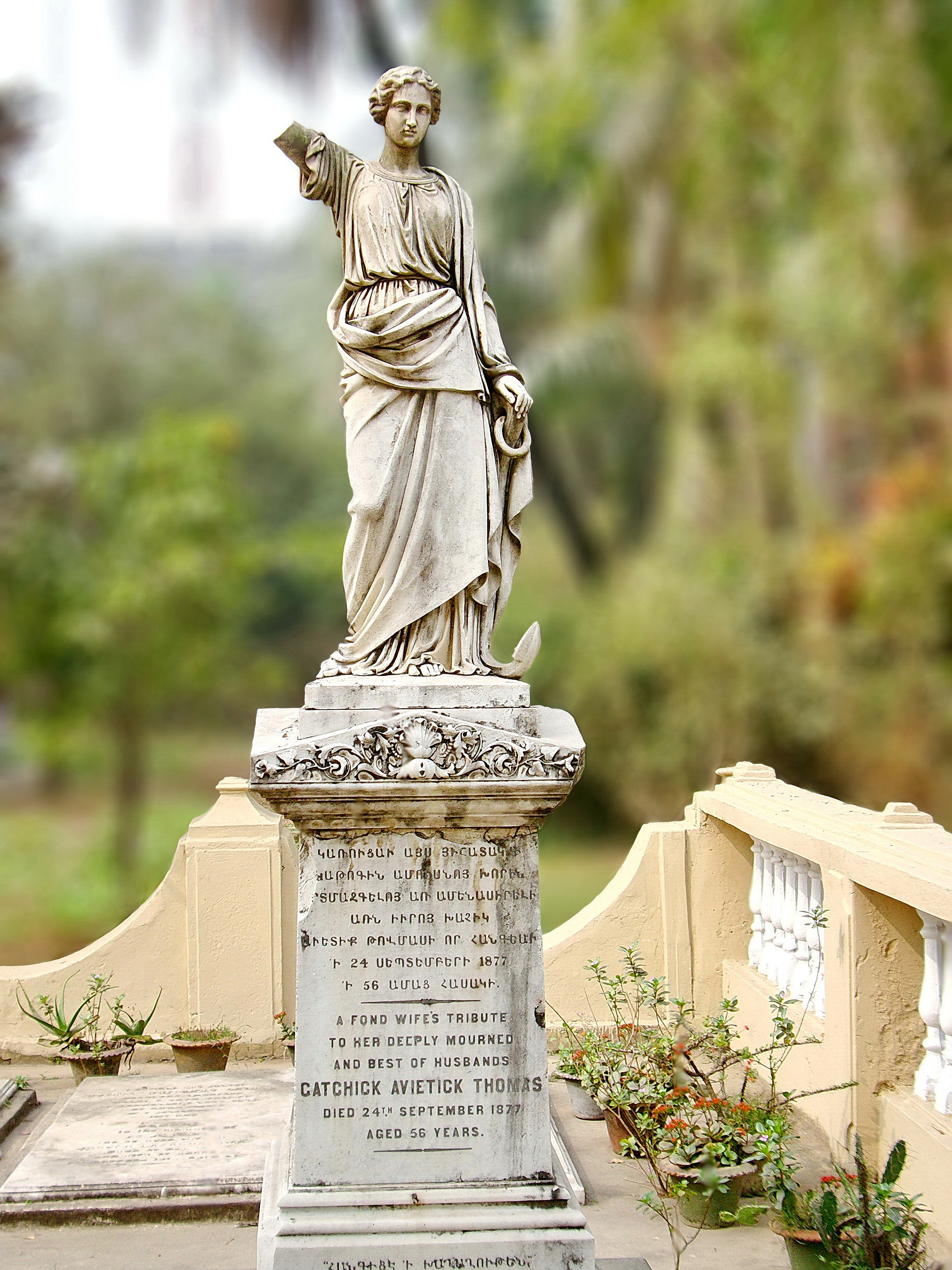
- Statue inside the Holy Resurrection Church of Armanitola

Total population
- 0

Regions with significant populations
- Dhaka (Armanitola)

Languages
- Armenian, English, Bengali

Religion
- Armenian Apostolic

Related ethnic groups
- Armenians in India, Armenians in Pakistan, Armenians in Myanmar

Ethnic Armenians lived in the region of Bengal (present-day Bangladesh and Indian states of West Bengal and Tripura) since at least 17th century. There was a fairly large Armenian colony in Dhaka, concentrated in the neighbourhood of Armanitola, during the early part of the 18th century. The Armenian community played a significant role in Bengali trade and commerce in the 17th and 18th centuries. The Armenian Apostolic Church of the Holy Resurrection established by the community in 1781, along with the adjacent cemetery, is a major landmark and tourist attraction of old Dhaka.

Their presence, however, began to decline from the beginning of British rule. Their numbers have gradually diminished and there are now no Armenians in Bangladesh. Michael Joseph Martin (Mikel Housep Martirossian), reported to be the last Armenian in Dhaka, died on 9 May 2020.

== History ==
There is no exact record of when the Armenians first came to Dhaka. Some historians suggest that they came in Bengal in the early 17th century as a part of the migration of Armenians from Persia. After Safavid rulers conquered Eastern Armenia in the Caucasus, Shah Abbas deported about 40,000 Armenian traders specialized in inter-Euroasiatic trade to Isfahan and New Julfa.

Armenian traders first came to Bengal from Isfahan and New Julfa in the wake of Persian adventurers, eventually establishing their own trading community. They were recognized as a distinct trading community by the Mughal government since late 17th century. It is not known when they came to Dhaka, then one of the commercial centres in Bengal. On the evidence of dates on tombstones the time is assumed to be early 18th century.

As Persian was the official language of the Mughal court, the Persian-speaking Armenians could easily settle themselves down in the Mughal Empire. The Nawabs of Dhaka are known to have engaged them to transact their personal businesses openly or clandestinely as well as the European maritime companies, who used them as local representatives and their vakils (spokesperson or pleaders) to the royal courts. Khwaja Hafizullah, a merchant prince, laid the foundations for the Dhaka Nawab Family by accumulating wealth by doing business with Greek and Armenian merchants. This trend was followed by his nephew and the first Nawab of the family Khwaja Alimullah.

Initially they lived in the neighborhoods of Moulvibazar and Nolgola, before moving to Armanitola. Between 1833 and 1918, at the height of Armenian presence, the records of Armanian Church in Dhaka list over 200 deaths, as well as over 250 baptisms and over 50 marriages. Apart from Dhaka there was a significant Armenian presence in Saidabad (a suburb of the capital Murshidabad), Hoogli, Kolkata, Chinsura, Patna and Kasimbazar.

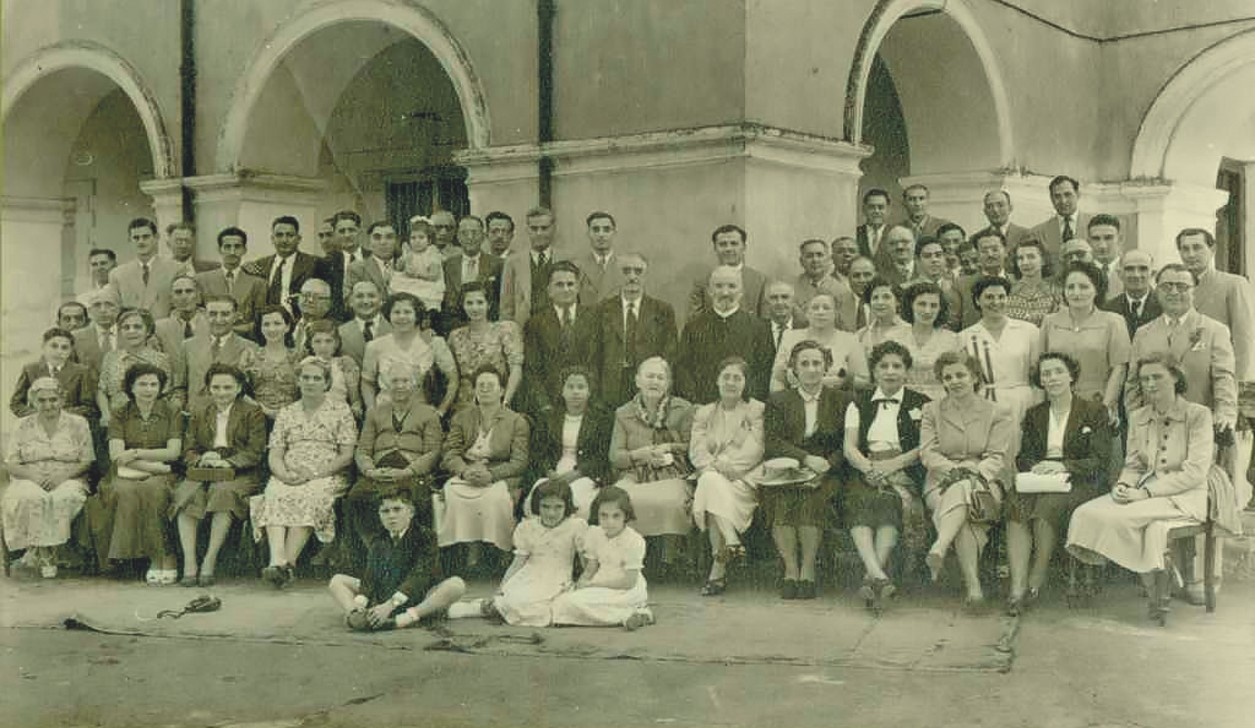
The Armenian Community Dhaka celebrating Armenian Christmas, 1952

== Living and lifestyle ==
The Armenian community of Dhaka were initially engaged in export trade paying a duty of 3.5% to the government. Dhaka was the hub of fine textiles at that time, a fact that attracted Persians and Armenians to settle business there. In an estimate of the textile export from Dhaka (which was a major textile production center in Bengal), the Armenian share was said to have been 27% in 1747. In the silk market, there are indications that the Armenians were dominant buyers, along with Gujaratis and merchants from Delhi, Agra and Benares.

They were also prominent in the jute trade. Most of Armenians were engaged in the jute trade. Prominent Armenian jute merchants had their own companies, like Messrs Sarkies & Sons, Messrs David & Co. and others. But gradually the jute business was monopolised by the more powerful and better-organised British firms. Besides these, they also did businesses of saltpeter, salt, and betel nut.

The Armenian community in Armanitola was small but rich. Some wealthy Armenians used to reside in European-style bungalows. was one such bungalow that was quite popular. Parts of the gardens of Shahbag, Ruplal House (another major landmark in old Dhaka) and the land where Bangabhaban (the presidential residence) stands belonged to Armenian zamindars (landlords). There is still a Manuk House inside Bangabhaban, bearing the name of the original owner's family. Armenians introduced Ticca-Garry (horse-carriage) in Dhaka and it became a popular transport of Dhaka. They also set up western-style department stores in Dhaka. The stores mostly sold European and British goods.

They also played a major role as patrons of education and urban development in Dhaka. The Pogose School, the first private school in the country, was founded by Nicholas Pogose, a merchant and a zamindar. P Arathon was the headmaster of the Normal School. According to the Dhaka Prakash, a newspaper of his time, students in his school scored better in examinations than students of other normal schools in Bengal, including the one in Hoogli.

== Armenian church ==
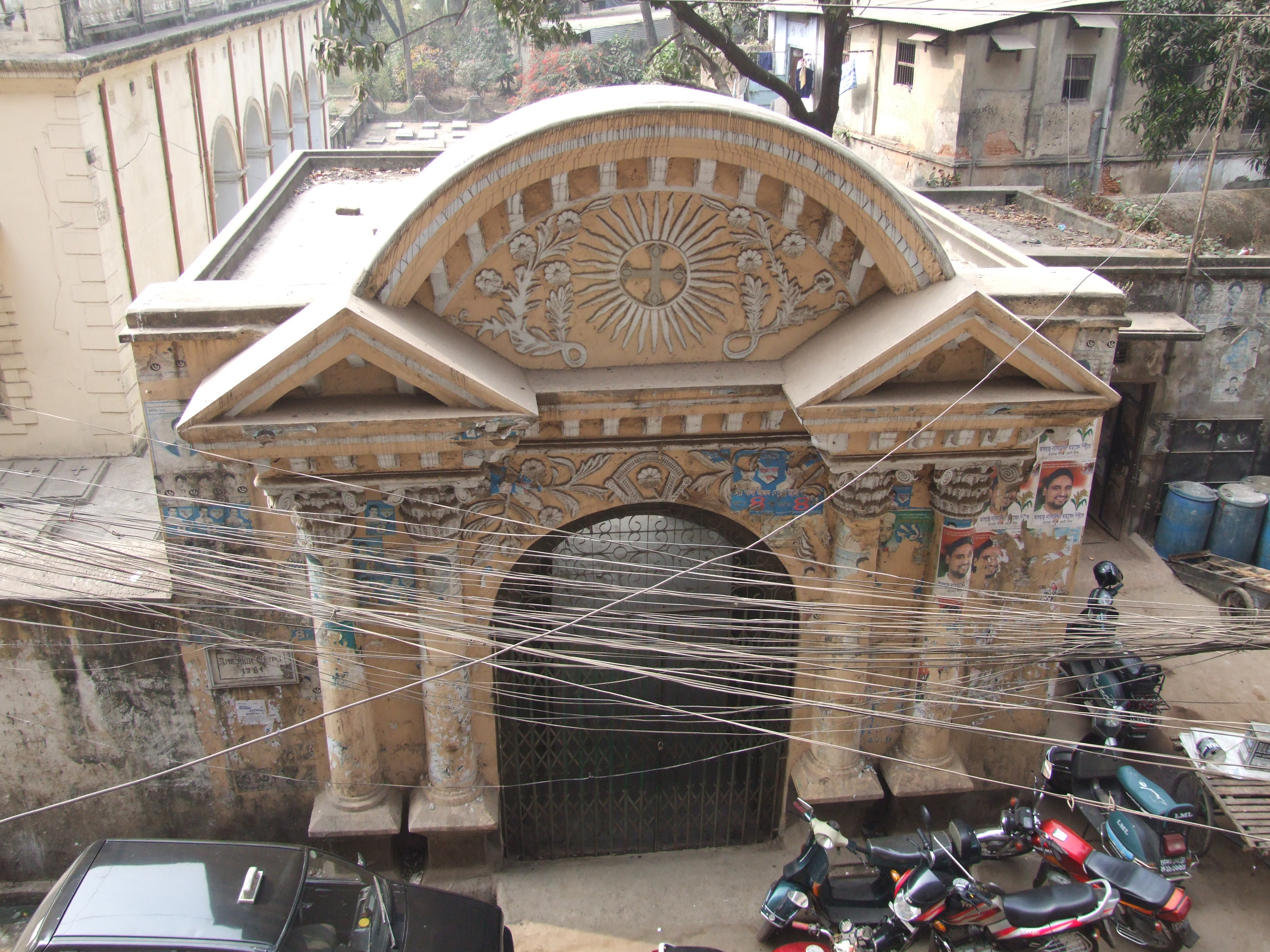
Entrance of Armenian Church, Armanitola

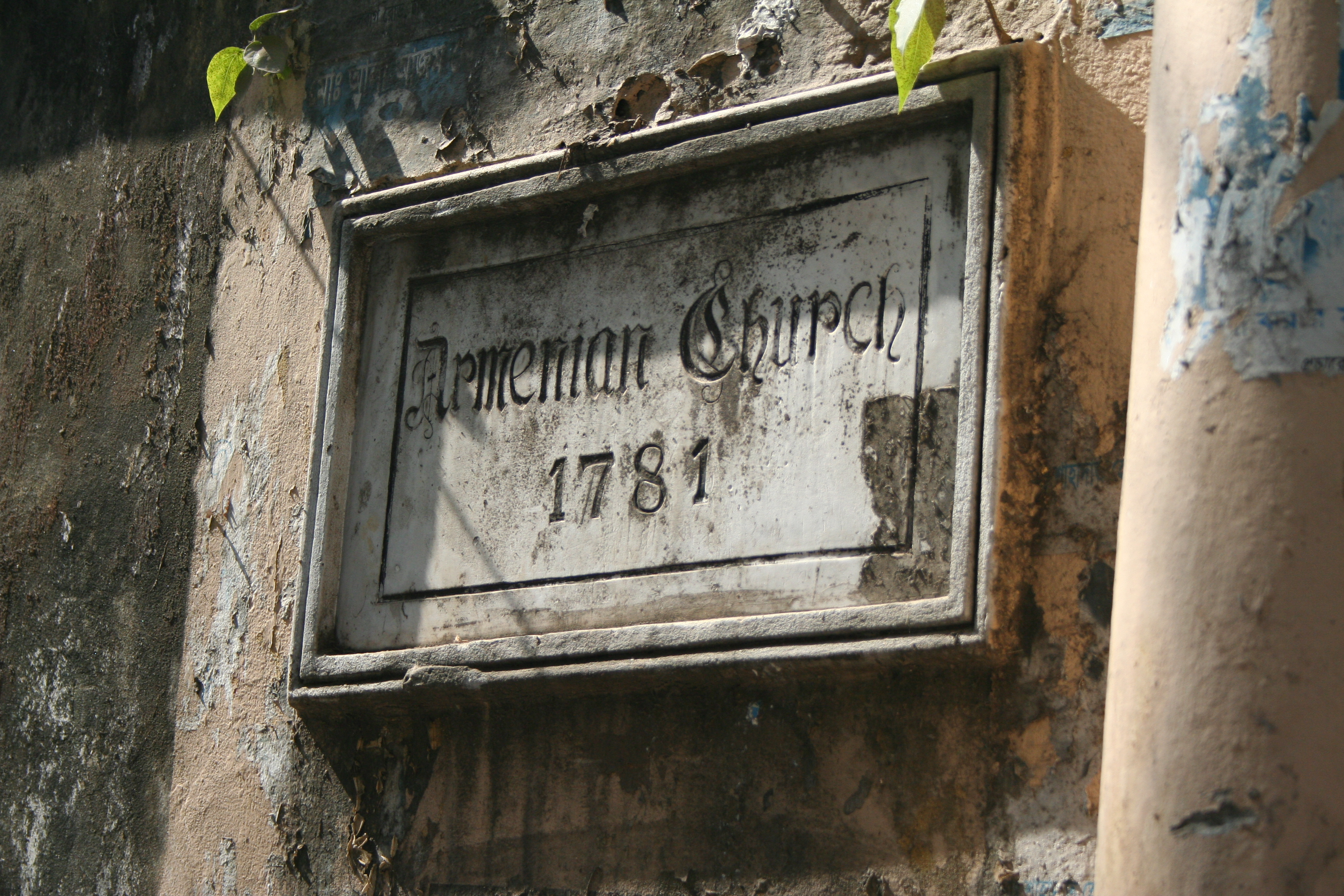
Foundation-plaque of the Church, founded 1781

Prior to building the church at Armanitola (popularly known as the Armani Church) they worshiped at a small chapel in the same area, while deceased members of the community were interred at the Roman Catholic Church at Tejgaon, which was five miles from Dhaka at the time. Some of the Armenian tombstones there date back from 1714 to 1794. The oldest tombstone is "Avetis", an Armenian merchant who died on 15 August 1714.

After moving to Armanitola, Armenian settlers built a small chapel in the midst of their community graveyard. By the end of the 18th century, the Armenian community had grown considerably, and the chapel was found inadequate for the needs of the community. It was then replaced by the Holy Resurrection Church, completed in 1781 and consecrated by Bishop Ephreim. A belfry on the west of the church was added in 1837. The tower fell down during the earthquake of 1897. A parsonage was added and the floor of the church was decorated with marble, and electric lights in 1910.

== Notable Armenians of Bengal ==
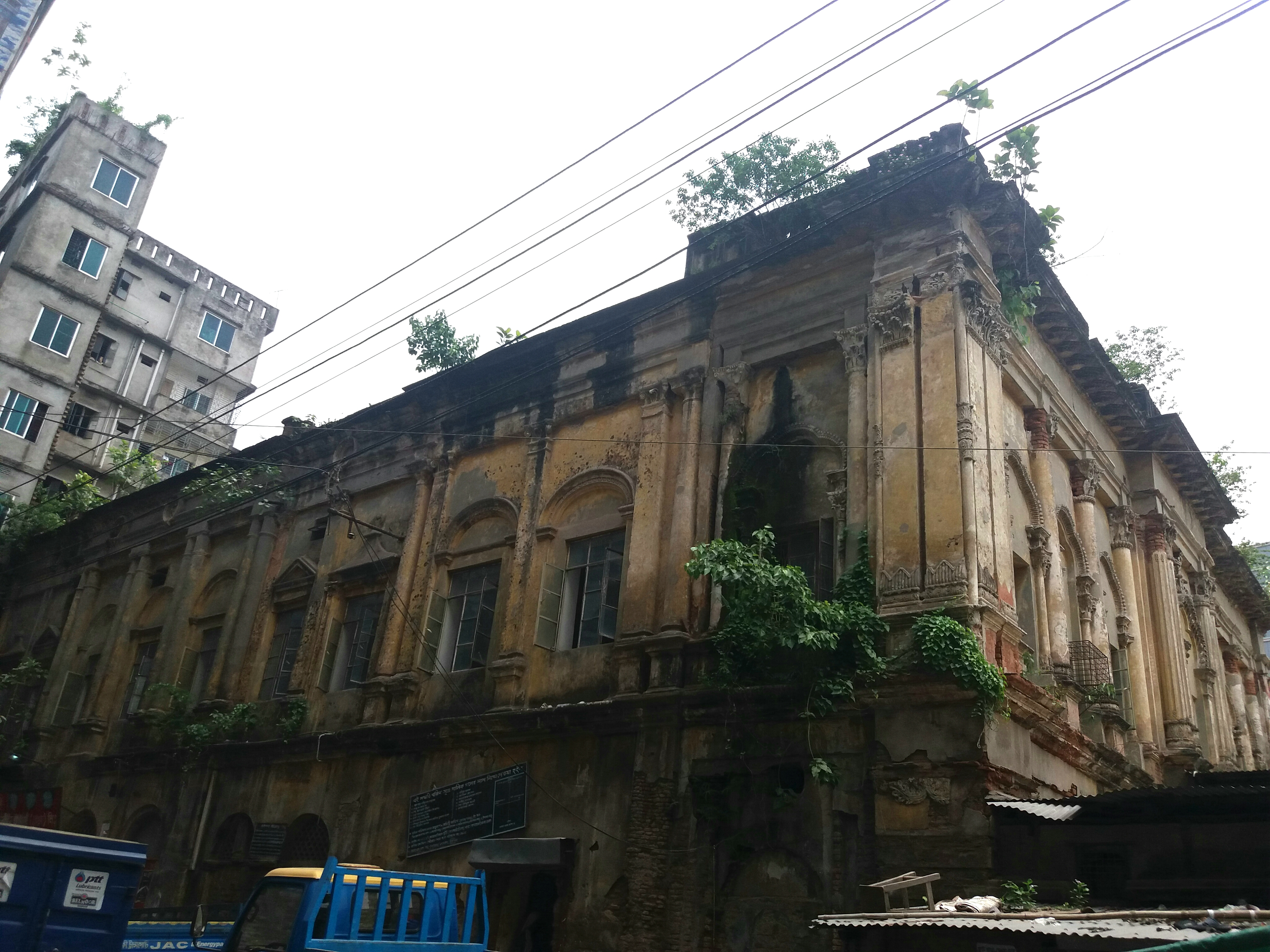
House of Nicholas Pogose before demolition

Armenian influence in the commercial life of Dhaka was led by the Pogoses, Agacy, Michael, Stephen, Joakim, Sarkies, Arathon (also spelled as Aratun), Coja (also spelled Khojah or Koja) and Manook (also spelled as Manuk) families. Alongside members of the major merchant families, Margar David, Mackertich Abraham George, Michael Sarkies, Abraham Lucas, M Highcazony, A S Mackertich, Tigran Nahapiet, Thaddeus Nahapiet, M.J. Catchhatoor, Joseph Lazarus, and M David were other prominent Armenians of Dhaka.

Dhaka was not the only center of Armenian influence in the region, and there were Armenians who rose to prominence for all of Bengal. There is an Armanitola in Kolkata, and an Armanighat as well.

- Coja Phanoos Kalandar: The earliest noted Armenian who entered into an agreement with the East India Company for using English ships for trade by himself and other members of his community in 1688.
- Coja Israel Sarhad: A nephew of Khwaja Phanoos, he helped the English to secure the Company's Kolkata zamindari from Subadar Azim ush Shan in 1698, and was a vakil (spokesperson) of the Company's Surman Embassy to the Mughal Emperor Farrukh Siyar. He was instrumental in realizing the grand imperial farman (decree) of 1717 granting extraordinary privileges to the Company.
- Coja Petrus Nicholas: He was court advisor and financier to Nawab Alivardi Khan, and a leader of the Armenian community.
- Coja Wajid: The most notable Armenian in Bengal. A monopolist in the highly profitable saltpetre trade (one of the most important commodities in the export list of the European companies) since 1753, this Armenian merchant conducted most of the negotiations between the Company and Nawab Siraj ud-Daulah. Conducting his trading from Hugli, he dominated the commercial scene of Bangal as one of the merchant princes along with Mahtab Chand and Sawaroop Chand known as the two Jagat Seths (bankers of the world), as well as Omichand. Son of Khojah Mahmet Fazel, an influential Armenian merchant in the mid 18th century, he obtained footholds in the durbar of the Nawab as a vakil for his community in 1740s and eventually rose to be a member of the Nawab's inner-circle.

He had extensive business transactions with the French, the Dutch and the English. At one point, Jean Law de Lauriston, the chief of the French factory at Kasim Bazar pointed out that Wajid wanted to be on good terms with everybody. He owned at least six ships - Salamat Ressan, Salamat Manzil, Mobarak, Gensamer, Medina Baksh and Mubarak Manzil - traveling from Hoogli to Jeddah, Mocha, Basra, Surat and Masulipatnam.
After the Battle of Plassey, he obtained a parwana (decree) from Mir Jafar, the new Nawab, "for the entire possession of the saltpetre trade at Patna", which he promised to use in assistance to the Company in procuring salt at the cheapest rate, provided they "assisted him in return to make the Dutch purchase from him". The Company took over his saltpetre empire in 1758, which grew to generate an annual revenue of Rs. 1 million in 1773. In 1759, he was captured and jailed by the Company, where he poisoned himself. After his death, Khoajah Petruse Aratoon took over as leader of the Armenian community in Bengal.

- Coja Gregory: Popularly known as Gurgin Khan, he was a brother of Khojah Petruse and a minister to Nawab Mir Qasim as well as the Commander-in-Chief of his army. He is cited by Gholam Hossein in Siyar-ul-Mutakhkherin as the chief of the artillery and the Nwab's principal serviceman. An assassin killed him after the Battle of Giria (August 1763).
- Nicholas Pogose: Popularly known as Nicky Pogose, he was a zamindar, a merchant, a partner of the first bank in Bangladesh - Dhaka Bank - and one of nine commissioners of Dhaka Municipality (1874–1875).

== See also ==
- Armenians in India
- Armanitola Government High School
- Saidabad St. Mary Armenian Church

== Sources ==
- Mamoon, Muntasir, Smriti Bismritir Dhaka, Ananya, Dhaka, 1993, ISBN 984-412-104-3
- Ali, Ansar; Chaudhury, Sushil; Islam, Sirajul (2012). "Armenians, The". In Islam, Sirajul; Jamal, Ahmed A. (eds.). Banglapedia: National Encyclopedia of Bangladesh (Second ed.). Asiatic Society of Bangladesh.
