= Nicholas Pogose =

Armenian merchant and a zamindar (died 1876)

Nicholas Peter Pogose
- Նիկոլաս Պոգոզե
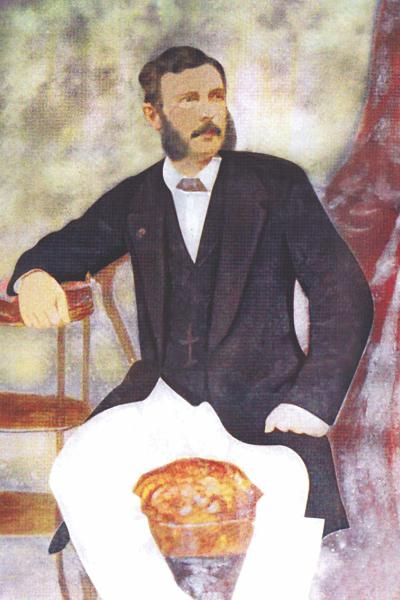
- Painting of Pogose by Charles Pote
- Died: c. 25th October 1876
- Resting place: Narinda Christian Cemetery, Dhaka, Bengal Presidency, British India
- Education: Dhaka Collegiate School; Dhaka College
- Occupations: merchant, zamindar
- Spouse: Mary Pogose
- Children: Gregory Joachim Pogose; John Pogose; Nicholas Joachim Pogose; Paul Pogose

Nicholas Peter Pogose (Armenian: Նիկոլաս Պոգոսե; known as Nicky Pogose; died c. 1876) was an Armenian merchant and a zamindar. He belonged to the Armenian community of Dhaka.

== Career ==
Pogose studied in Dhaka Collegiate School and Dhaka College.

On 12 June 1848, Pogose founded the Pogose Anglo Vernacular School (later Pogose School), the first private school in Dhaka. He served as its headmaster until 1855. He served as one of the nine commissioners of Dacca Municipality during 1874–75. He was a partner of the Dacca Bank.

Pogose built the Weis House which is currently the headquarters of Bulbul Lalitakala Academy. By 1868, Pogose became one of five Armenian zamindars in Dhaka.

Pogose died in 1876 and he was buried at the Christian Cemetery in the Narinda suburb of Dhaka. His epitaph reads"Till the day break and Shadows flee away".

== Family ==
Pogose was married to Mariam Avdall (b. 1825/26). She was a daughter of Johannes Avdall, the then headmaster of the Armenian College and Philanthropic Academy in Kolkata. Together they had at least 10 children including Gregory Joachim Pogose (b. 1845/46), John Pogose (b. 1850/51), Nicholas Joachim Pogose (1852–1872) and Paul Pogose (b. 1853/54).
