= Pogose School =

Pogose Laboratory School and College, IER, Jagannath University
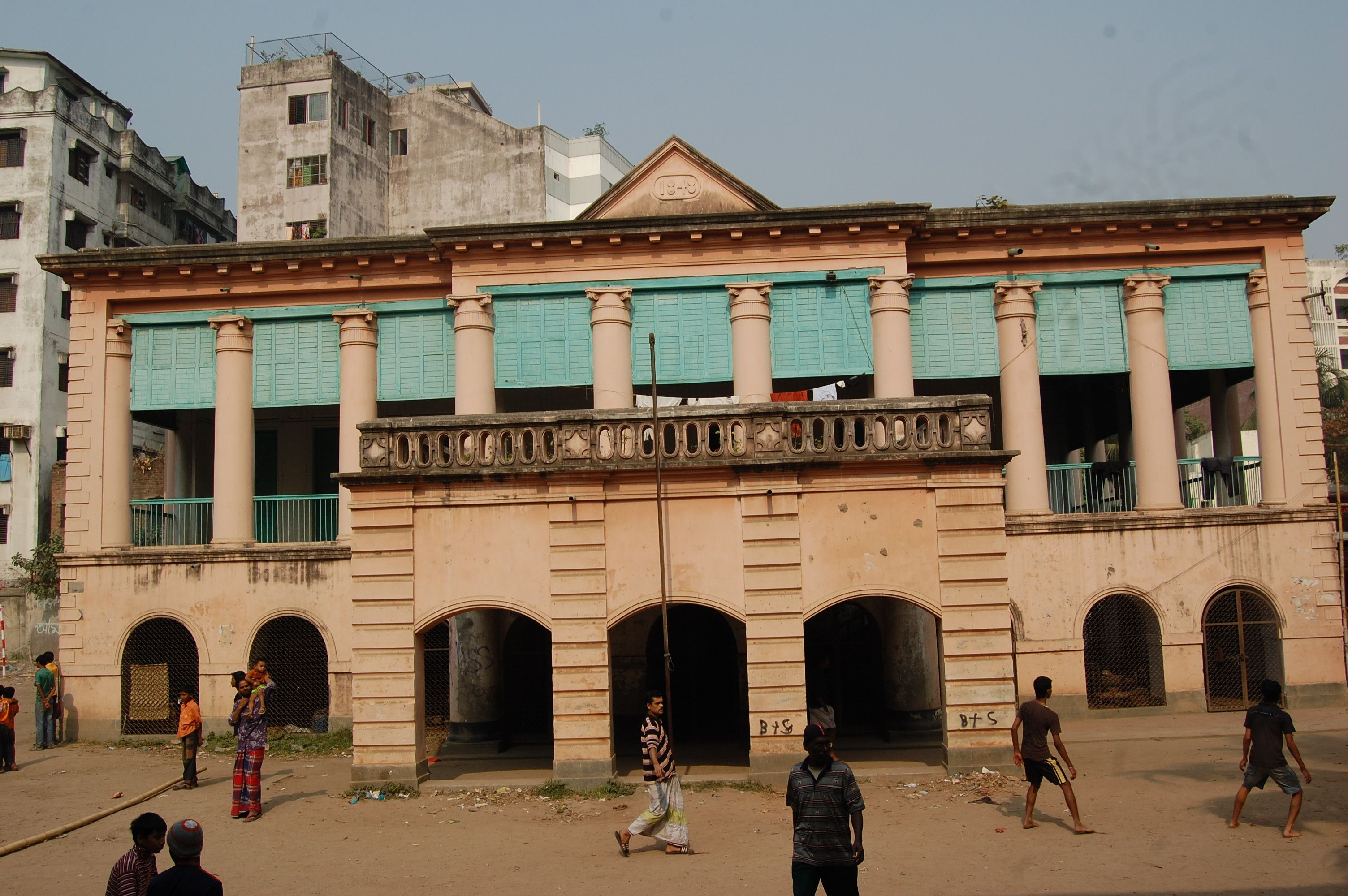

Location
- 6 Chittaranjan Avenue, Dhaka-1100; Bangladesh; 23.7094°N 90.4102°E

Information
- Type: Private
- Established: June 12, 1848; 178 years ago
- Grades: Class 1−10
- Campus size: 5-acre (20,000 m^{2})
- Campus type: Urban
- Colors: Sky blue Khaki

Pogose Laboratory School and College, IER, Jagannath University (Bengali: পোগোজ ল্যাবরেটরি স্কুল এন্ড কলেজ ,আ.ই.আর,জগন্নাথ বিশ্ববিদ্যালয়) was established in Dhaka on June 12, 1848, as the first private school of the country by Armenian merchant Nicholas Pogose, who was an ex-student of Dhaka Collegiate School. It is located at Chittaranjan Avenue. The school was managed as a proprietary institution and in 1871, about a year after the death of Pogose, it was taken over by Mohini Mohan Das, a banker and zamindar. After the death of Das in 1896 his estate kept the school open.

== History ==
According to historian Muntasir Mamun, Pogose Laboratory School and College, IER, Jagannath University started in 1848. It was also found that the school may have started a few years earlier as 99 students were suspended due to their inability to pay extended fees. After that the principal at the time, Dr. A.T. Wise, opened a school named Union School. It was created mainly for poor and underprivileged students, with Pogose taking it over two years later at his own expense. He gave it the name Pogose School.

This school was named Pogos Anglo Vernacular School at Dhaka. The school might have started in his own house and later moved to his friend JC Paniati's home. Paniati was paid 10tk as rent. The former headmaster of the school Monindrachandra Vattachariya moved the school from Paniati's house to the inside of Armenisa Church at the Sudhamay House, or beside the Shabistan Cinema Hall. The house boasted a large balcony, a garden and a cricket ground.

In 1878 the school was taken over by Mohinimohon Das, a famous zamindar and banker, after Pogose left Dhaka for London. After the death of Mohinimohon Das in 1896 the school was looked after by the trustee board of the Zamindari Estate, who moved it to Chittaranjan Avenue where it still stands today. It is believed that Mohinimohon's mother appointed Headmaster Proshonnokumar and Asst. Headmaster Horihor Dhor in 1907.

N.P. Pogose, a linguistics expert, was its founder and first headmaster. In the Jubilee report of the school Monindrachandra Vattachariya mentioned Pogose was the headmaster until 1855 and were used to give 3,000tk per month even after his departure. It is found from a report of Dhaka College that the income of the school on 1850 was 50 rupees, and expenditure was 90 rupees. N.P. Pogose paid all of the expenses from his own pocket. Mohini Mohon also donated three thousand taka every year for the duration of his ownership.

On August 13, 2015, Pogose School integrated with Jagannath University assuming the new name of Pogose Laboratory School and College, IER, Jagannath University.

== Notable alumni ==
Many of the students of Pogose School became famous and successful. Among them are Chief Ministers Profullah Chandra Ghosh (of West Bengal) and Ataur Rahman Khan (of East Bengal), as well as the first Bengali doctorate Nishikanto Chatterjee and the first Indian Doctor of Science Aghornath Chatterjee, who was the father of Sarojini Naidu.

There are a number of alumni who went on to become pioneers in their fields, including Dr. P K Ray, the first Bengali principal of Dhaka College, Sir K G Gupta, the first Indian Privy Councilor and the first ICS officer from East Bengal, and Girish Chandra Sen, first Quran translator in Bengali.

Poet Shamsur Rahman, Kaykobad, editor Kaliprasanna Ghosh, writer and Marxist activist Somen Chanda and comedian Bhanu Banerjee, as well as Zahirul Haque, Director of Banking Control of Karachi, the writer Nowsher Ali Khan Yusufzai, Journalist M Mamun Hossain and Babu Mathuramohan Chakraborty, the founder of Ayurvedic medicine house Sakti Ausadhalaya studied here.

Many scholars came to visit the school including Swami Vivekananda, Michael Madhusudan Dutta, Rambai and others.

According to sources, former Bangladesh national football team captain, Mohammed Mohsin was a student at the school.

Notable actors such as Prabir Mitra and ATM Shamsuzzaman also studied here.

== See also ==
- Armenian community of Dhaka
