= Armenian Church, Dhaka =

Church in Dhaka, Bangladesh

Holy Resurrection Church
- Սուրբ Յարութիւն Եկեղեցի
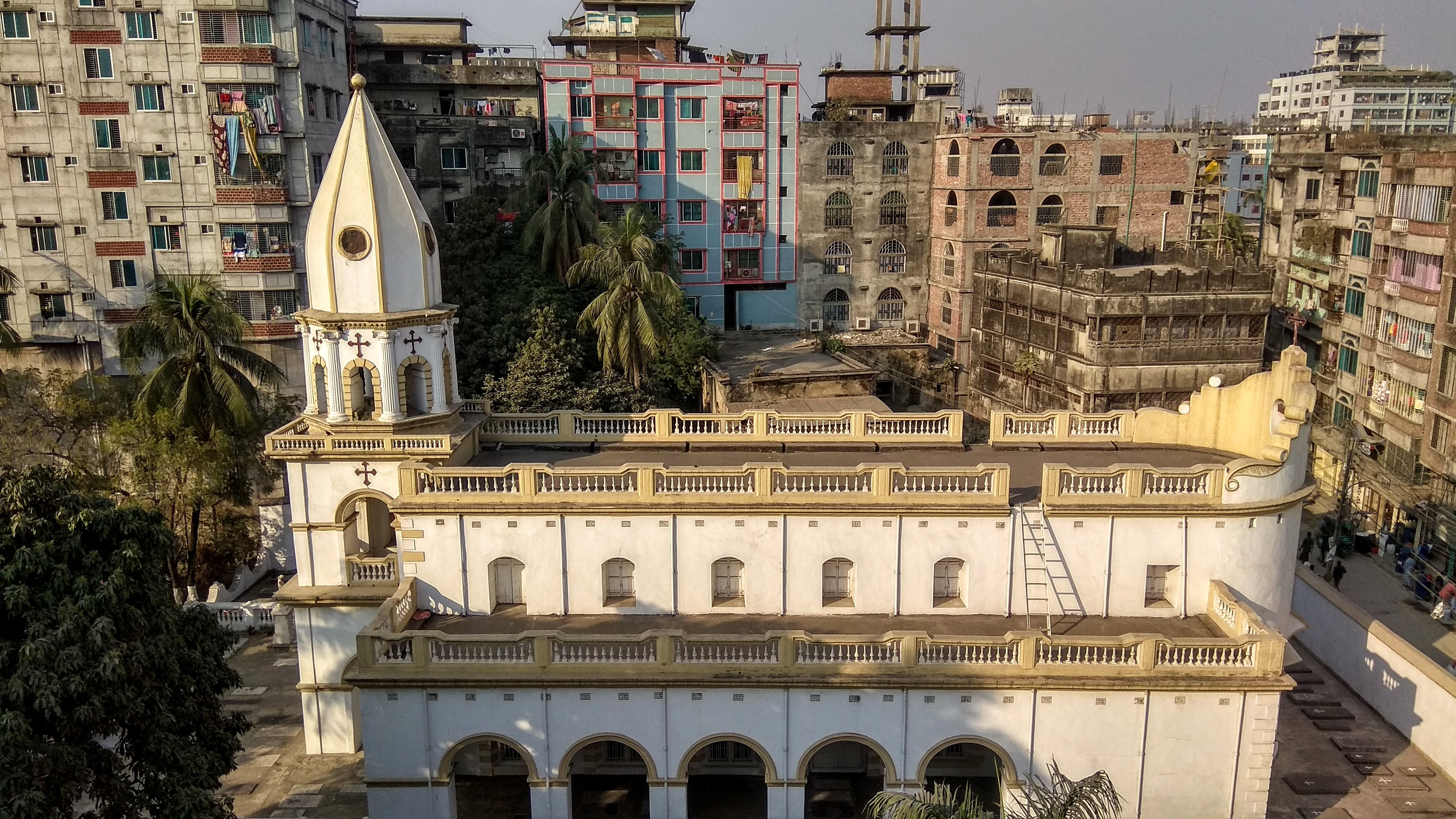
- Holy Resurrection Church, Dhaka

- Location within Bangladesh

Religion
- Affiliation: Armenian Apostolic Church
- Rite: Armenian

Location
- Location: Armanitola, Dhaka; Bangladesh
- Coordinates: 23.71249286°N 90.40208727°E

Architecture
- Style: Armenian
- Completed: 1781

The Armenian Church, also known as Armenian Apostolic Church of the Holy Resurrection (Armenian: Դաքքայի Սուրբ Յարութիւն Եկեղեցի), is a historically significant architectural monument situated in the Armanitola area of old Dhaka, Bangladesh. The church bears testimony to the existence of a significant Armenian community in the region in the 17th and 18th centuries.

== History ==
Following the domination of their homeland by Persian powers of the time, Armenians were sent by their new rulers to the Bengal region for both political and economic reasons. Although the Armenian presence in South Asia is now insignificant, their presence in Dhaka dates back to the 17th century. Armenians came to Dhaka for business. In Dhaka, Armenian merchants traded in jute and leather, and profitability in these businesses convinced some to move permanently to Bangladesh. The area where they lived became known as Armanitola.

In 1781 the now famous Armenian Church was completed on Armenian Street in Armanitola, then a thriving business district. The site was an Armenian graveyard before the church was built, and the tombstones that have survived serve as a chronicle of Armenian life in the area. Agaminus Catchik, an Armenian, gave away the land to build the church. Michel Cerkess, Okotavata Setoor Sevorg, Aga Amnius, and Merkers Poges helped build the church.

In the fifty years following the church's construction, a clock tower was erected on its western side. Allegedly, the clock could be heard four miles away, and people synchronised their watches with the sound of the tower's bell. The clock stopped in 1880, and an earthquake destroyed the tower in 1897. The Armenians played a prominent part in the jute trade in Dhaka and are reputed to be the pioneers of that trade in the second half of the 19th century. Today, the last Armenian that took care of the church was Mikel Housep Martirossian (Michael Joseph Martin). He was also one of the Armenians who was in the jute trade. It is important to mention that in the 1980s, when the church was at its most vulnerable, and close to being taken over, Mr. Martin was instrumental in maintaining the survival of the Armenian Church in Dhaka. Without the many personal sacrifices and complete devotion to the church, the premises and the history of the Armenians in Dhaka, would not have survived today. He and his family spearheaded what can only be described as a monumental effort to preserve the church, and because of his selfless efforts, and against all odds, the church continues to exist. Mr. Martin died in Canada on April 10, 2020.

== Architecture ==
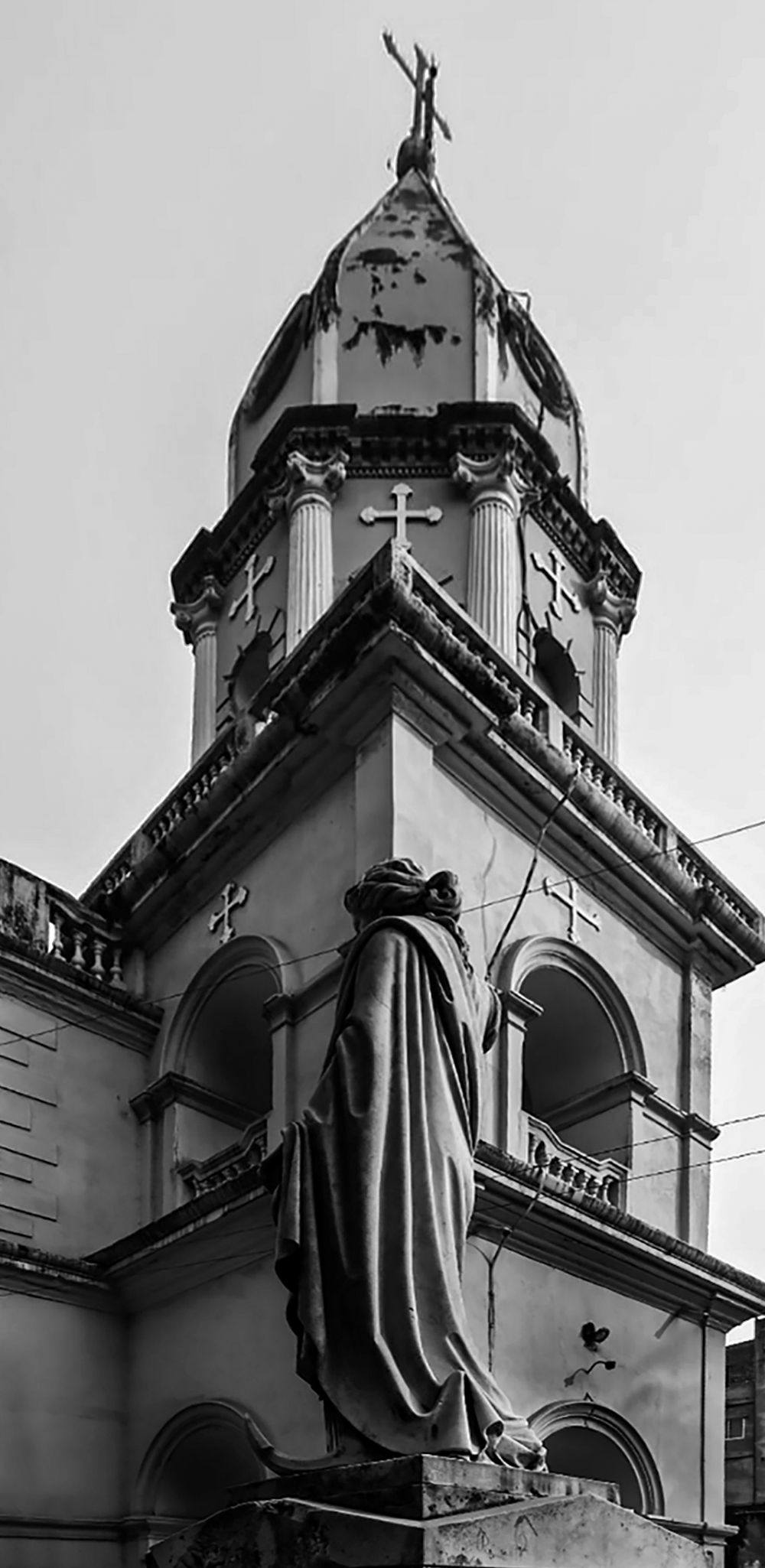
Armenian Church, 2008

The church is 750 feet (230 m) in length. It is two storied. It has 4 doors, 27 windows, all of them arched. The building plan has a main section where all the prayer activities take place and two rectangular wings on either side. The main floor is divided into three parts: a pulpit enclosed by railings, a middle section with two folding doors, and an area separated by a wooden fence for seating. Entrance into the church occurs through these two rectangular wings, which are also veranda spaces. There is a spiral staircase into the second floor of the church. For the rectangle end on the main section there are three doors on the ground door and first floor, where it turned into a balcony with railing. The rectangular wings of the church turned into terrace spaces on the first floor. Beside of this there was a watch house built by Johans Paru Piyete Sarkis. The watch house was destroyed by an earthquake in 1897. There is a square tower on the church with a "shonkhonil" (special type of minar used in India to show respect) minar on the top of it. The aisle of the church is 14 feet wide. There are some beautiful paintings in the church, by the artist Charles Port. There is a room behind the pulpit used for baptism, with a 3 foot deep marble baptismal font.

== Modern use ==
Mother Teresa stayed in the church compound during a 1996 visit to Dhaka.

In the old graveyard, amongst the 350 people buried there, a statue stands at the grave of Catchik Avatik Thomas, portraying his wife. The statue was bought from Kolkata and the grave is inscribed with the words "Best of Husband."

It was a subject of BBC and AFP documentaries before it was declared as a religious and historical heritage by the government of Bangladesh and put under supervision of the Department of Archaeology, Ministry of Cultural Affairs of Bangladesh that has taken measures to restore and safeguard the cultural heritage. Government of Armenia has shown interest to cooperate in the effort of the Bangladesh government. Now the site is open during daytime for the visitors.

== Maintenance ==
There are six staff members looking after the church. Armen Arslanian is the Warden and heads up the small team. |http://armenianchurchbangladesh.com/meet-the-team/ |url=https://agbu.org/silk-road-2020/brethren-bangladesh. There's no Armenian community or congregation in Dhaka, but the Church is offered for use regularly for services to the Church of Bangladesh. Occasionally there are Armenian services held by visiting Armenian priests.

An Armenian resident Priest was approved to go there from Armenia in 2023. The priest will be in residence at the church in Dhaka for most of each month but will also be available to tend to the needs of the Armenian communities of Singapore and Myanmar.

There is a guestbook for visitor to sign.

On each Thursdays, this church gets hundreds of visitors who are mostly local. On that day, it offers food to needy people which is called the Michael Martin Food Assistance Program. Babies are provided with milk and others with full meals.

== Gallery ==
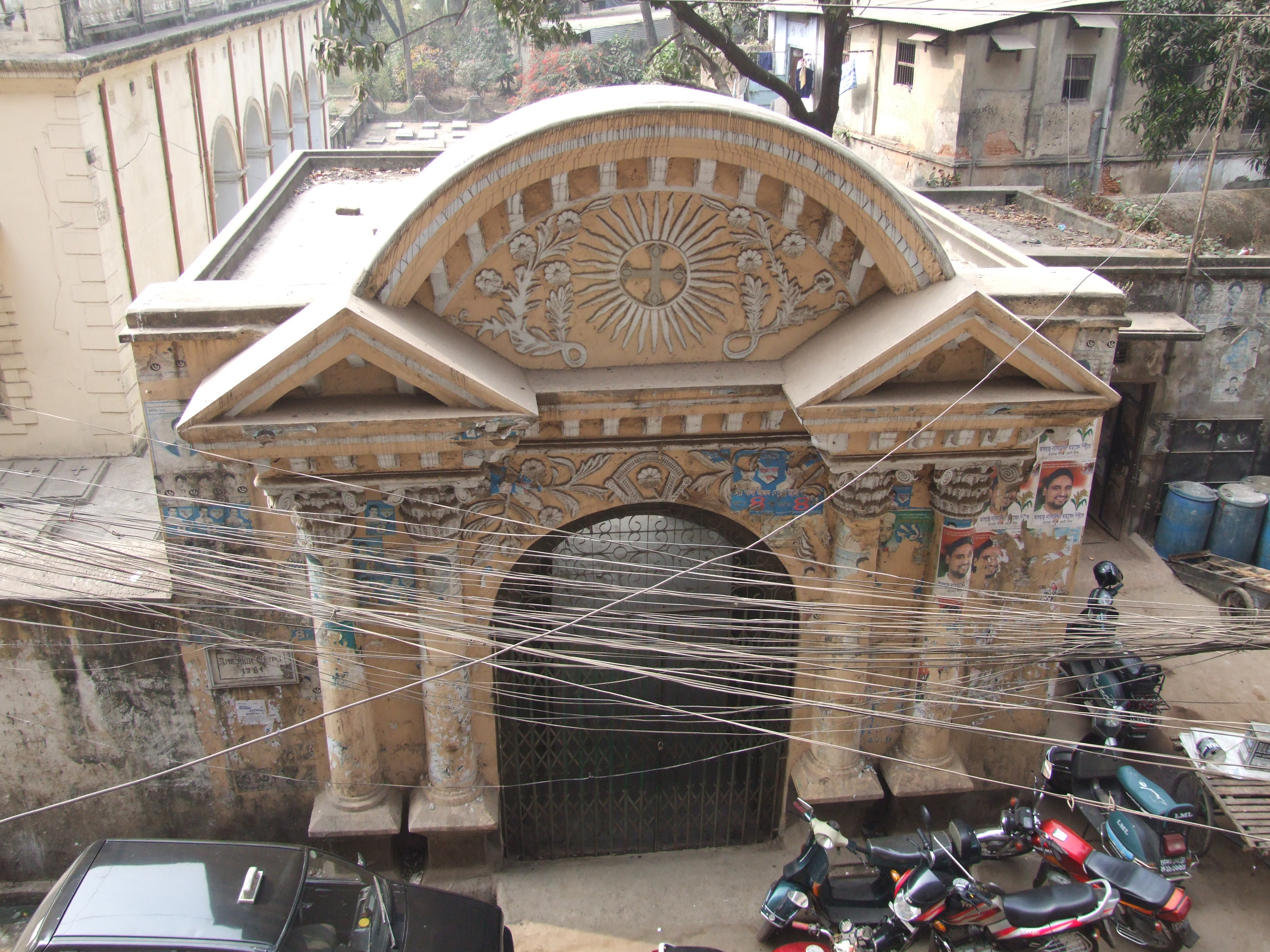
Entrance archway

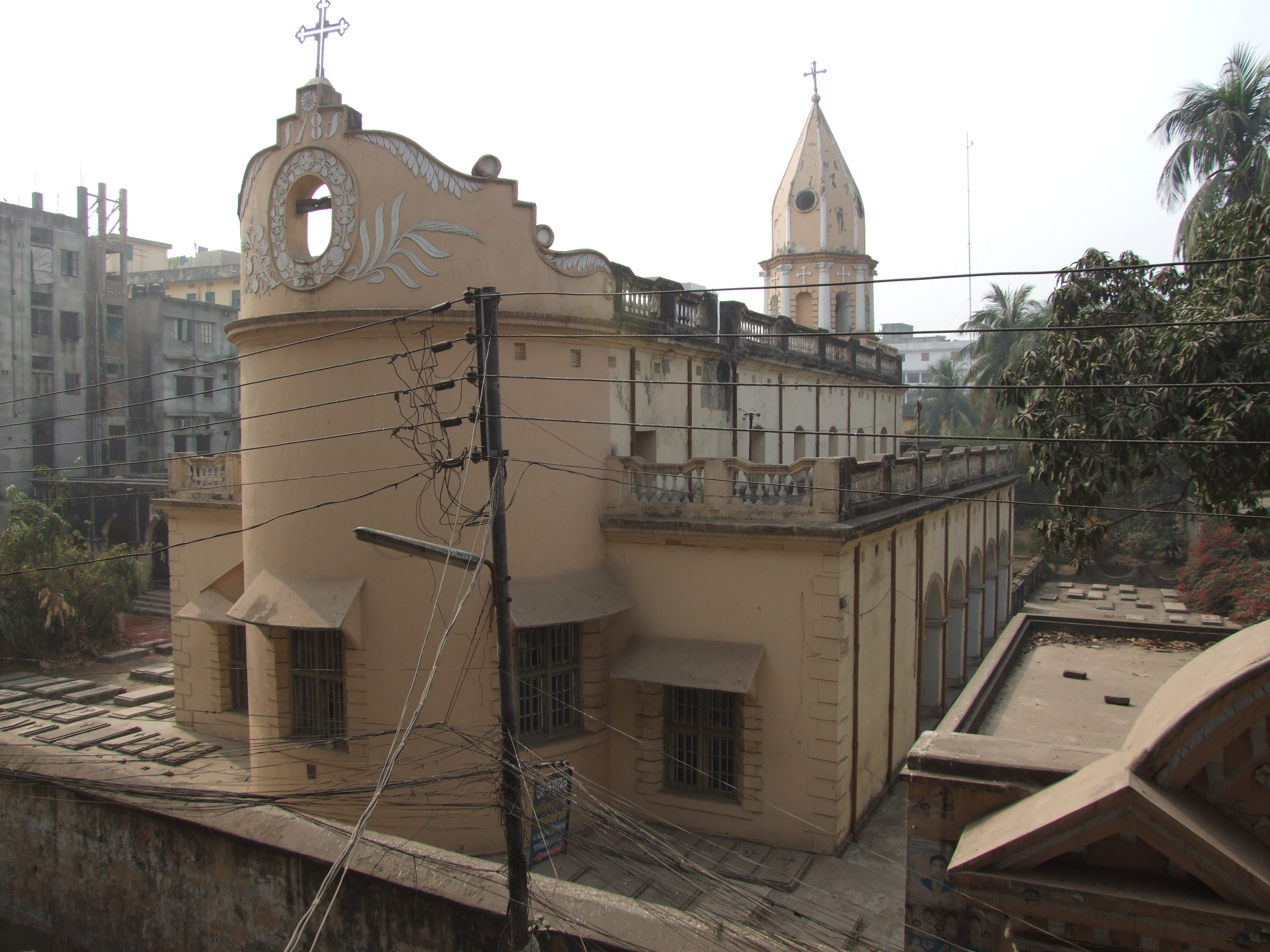
Overall view

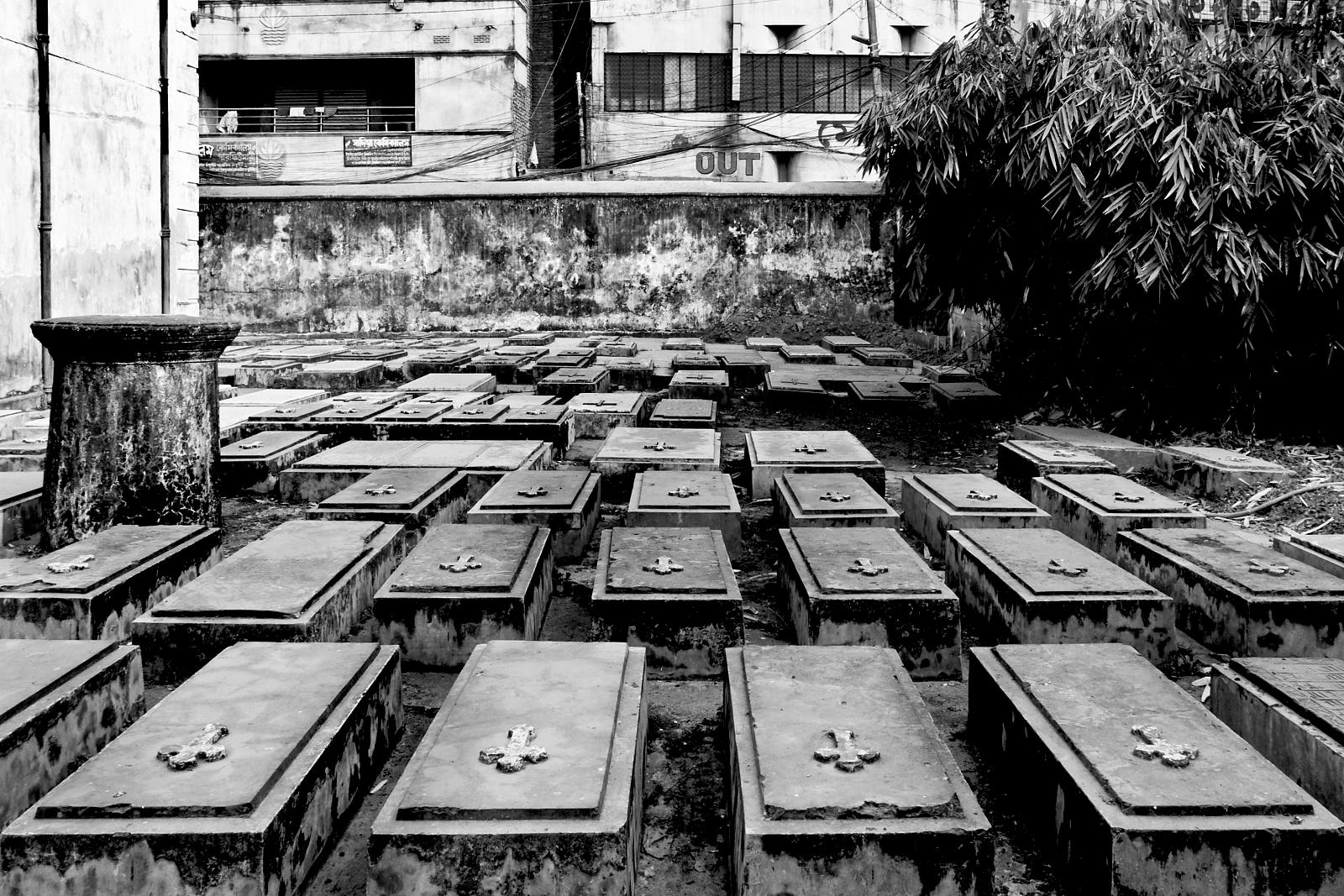
Graves in the graveyard

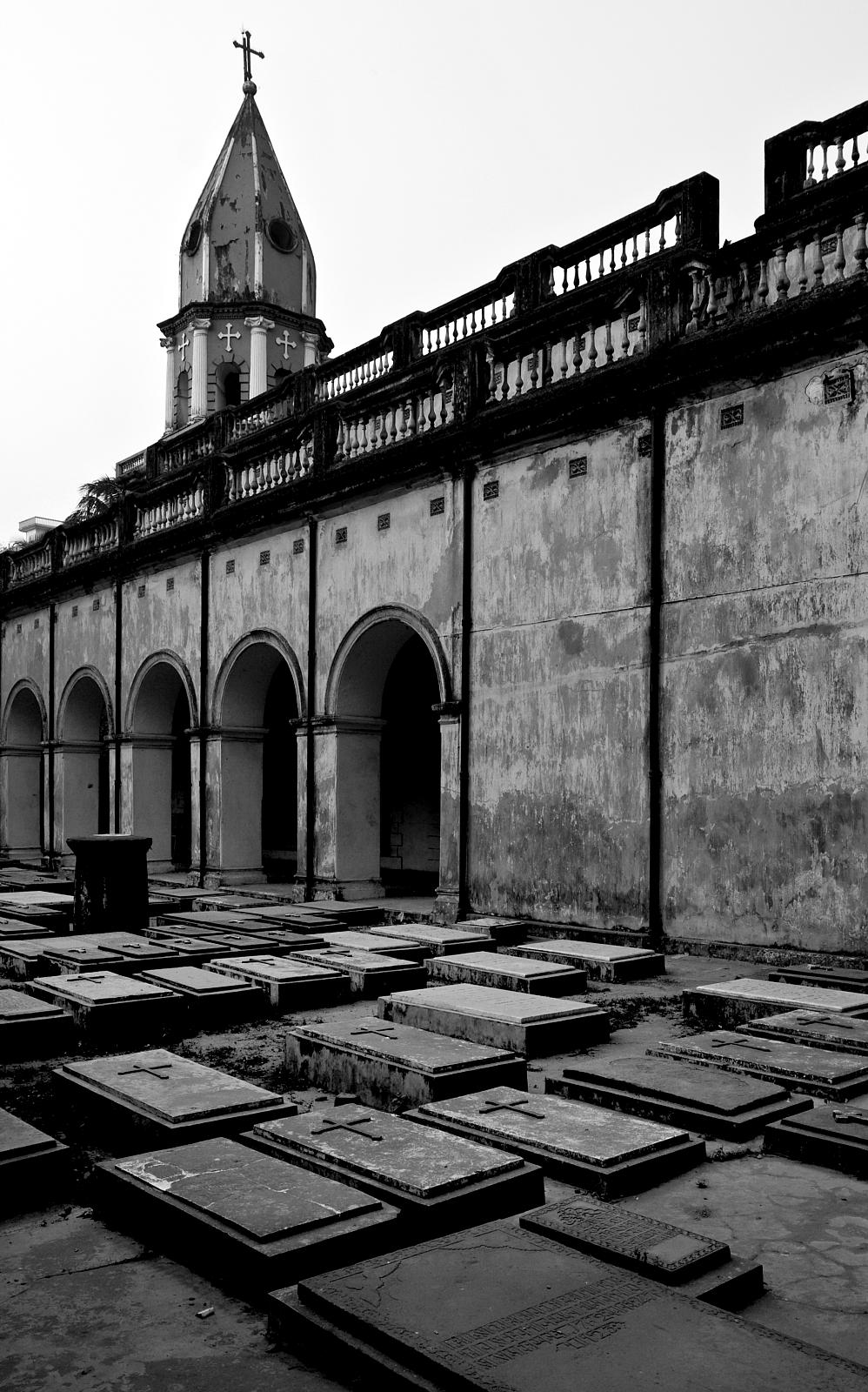
Graveyard and side of church

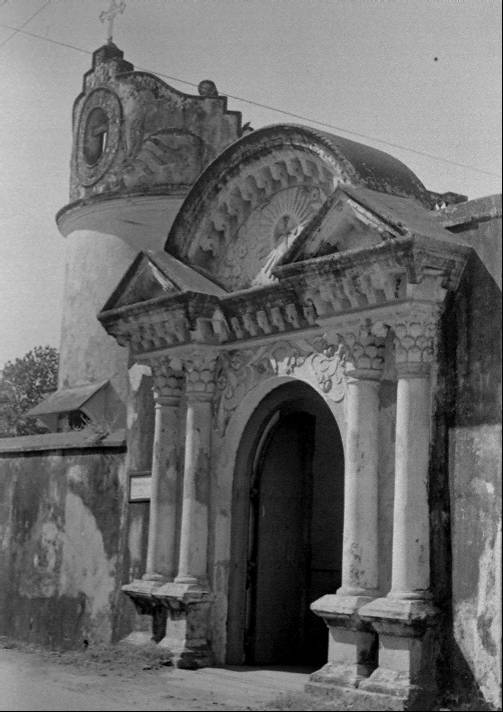
Entrance to the church compound, 1965

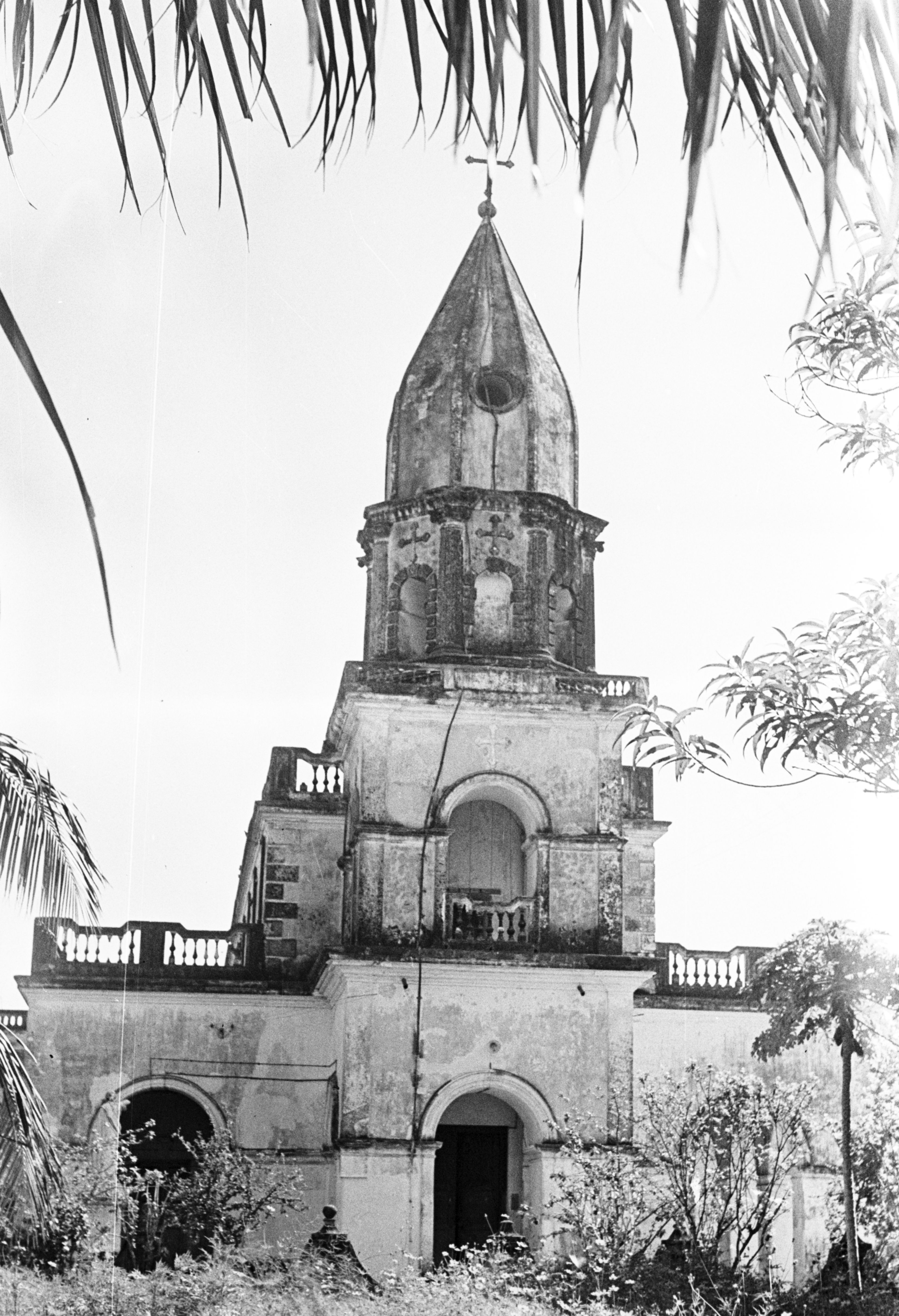
View of the church from the graveyard, 1965

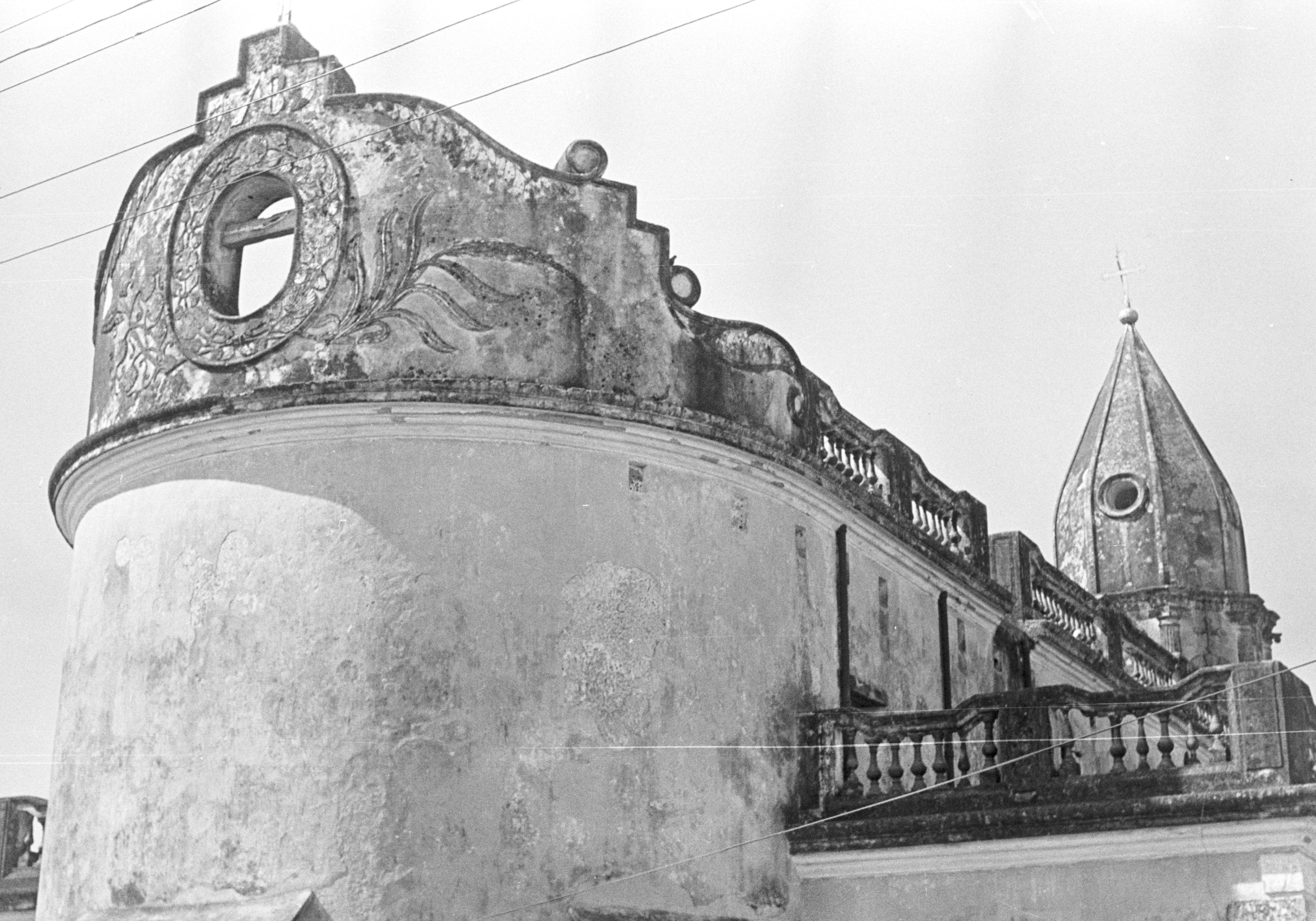
West end of the church, 1965

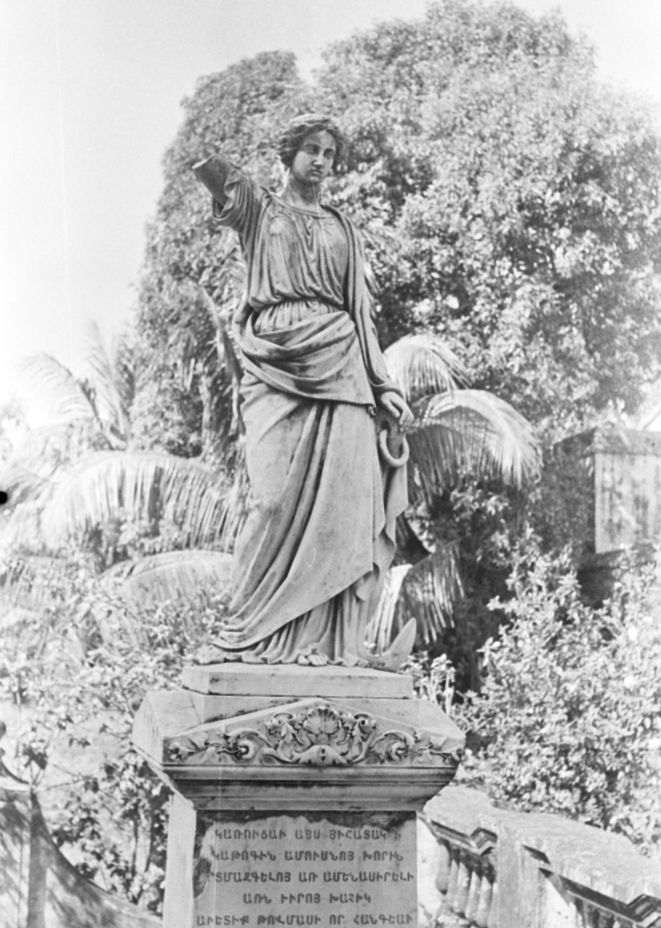
Statue on grave of Catchik Thomas, 1965

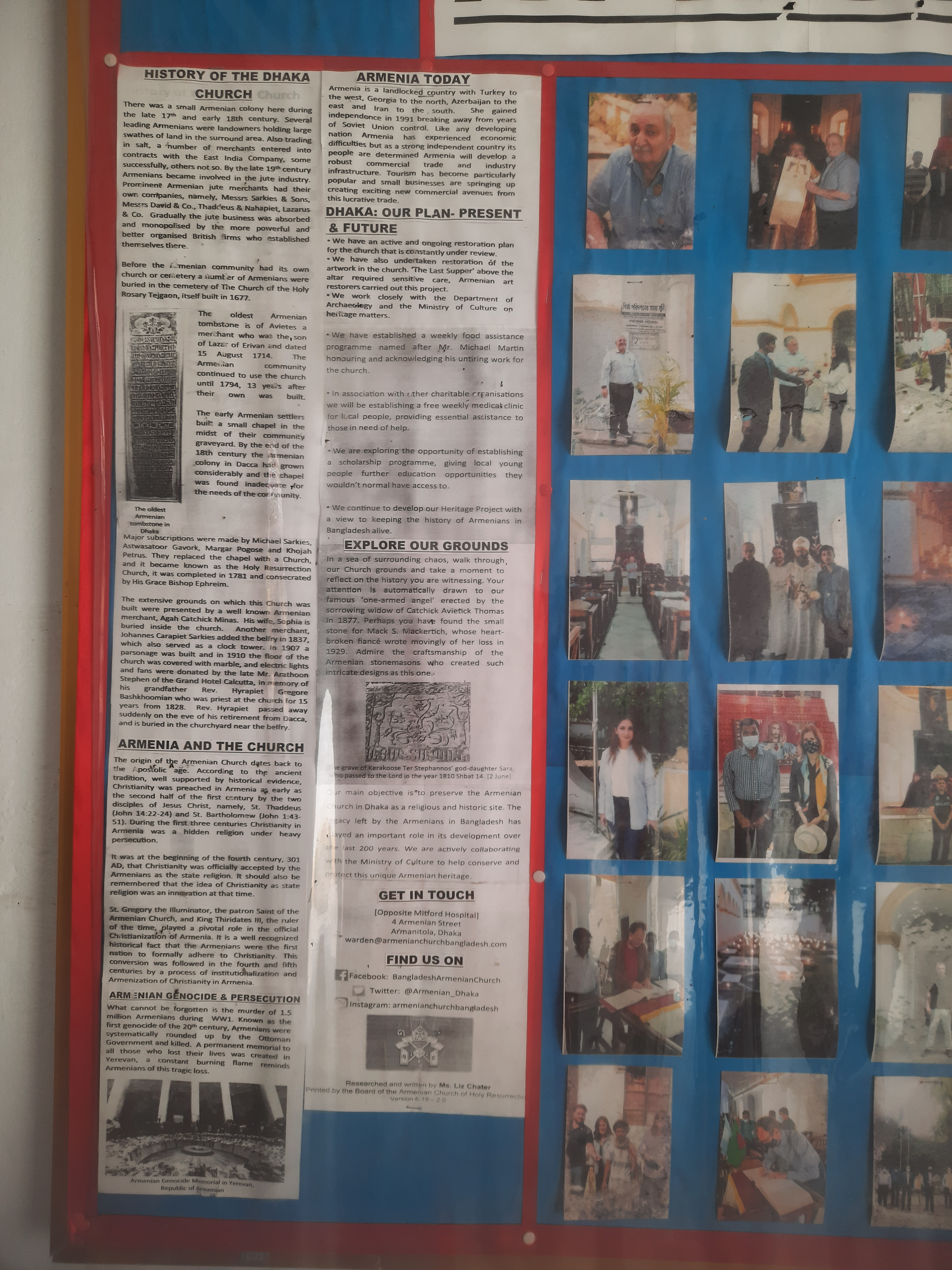
Armenian Church At A Glance at the entrance (Taken in 2023)

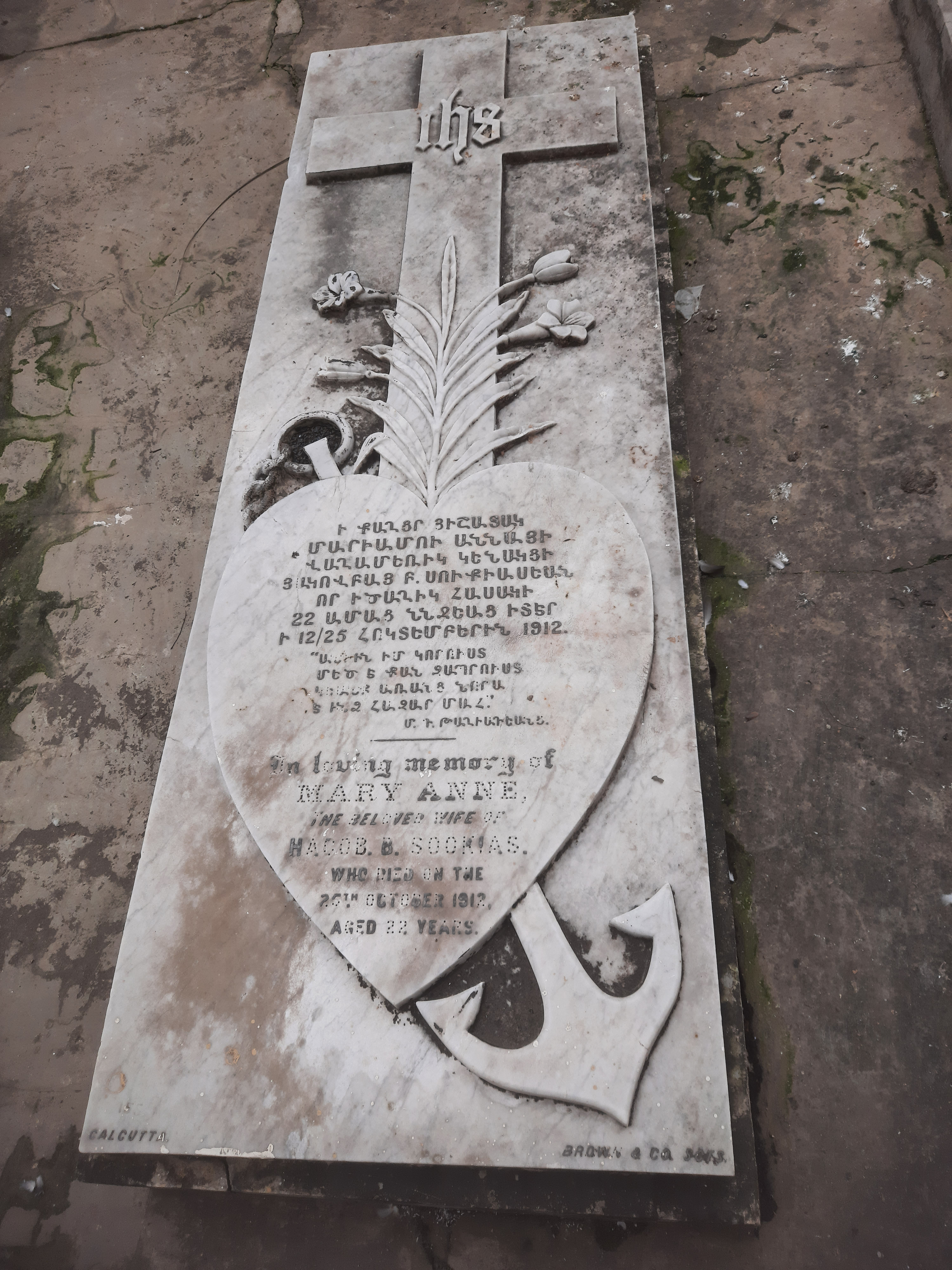
Armenian Church Epitaph (In Armenian)

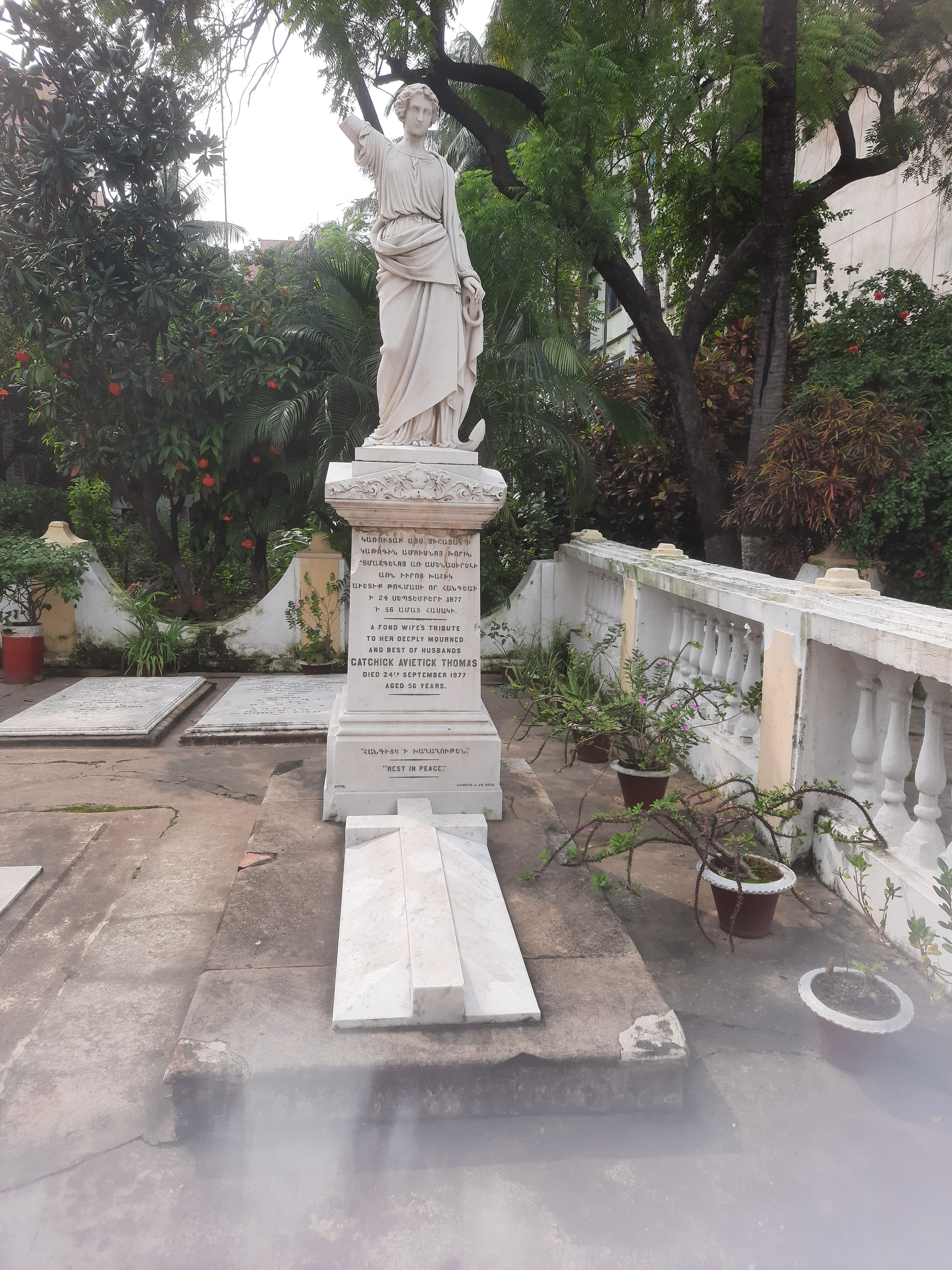
Armenian Church - Epitaph with a beautiful angel(Photos taken in 2023)

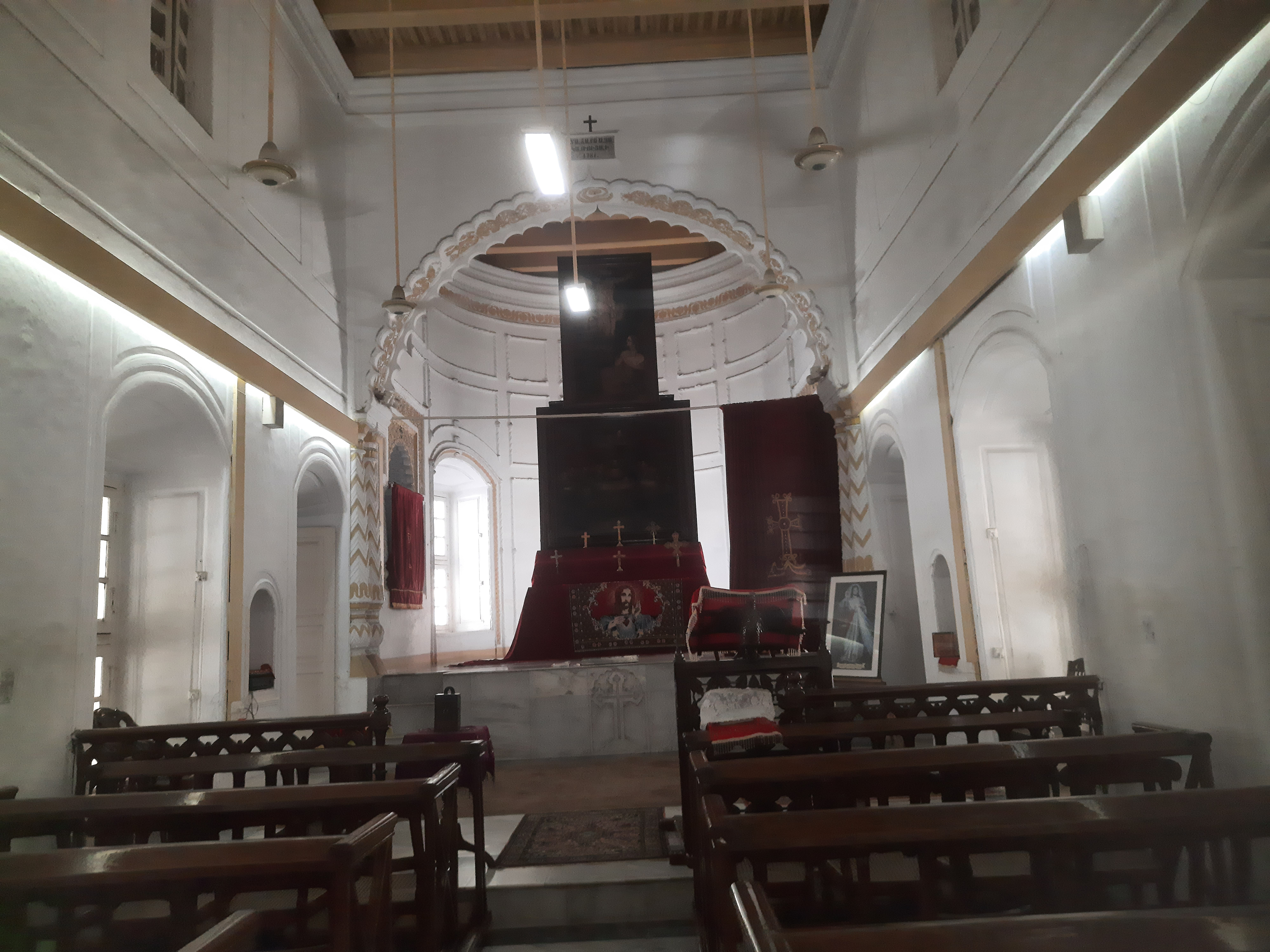
Inside of the Church (Recent Photo)

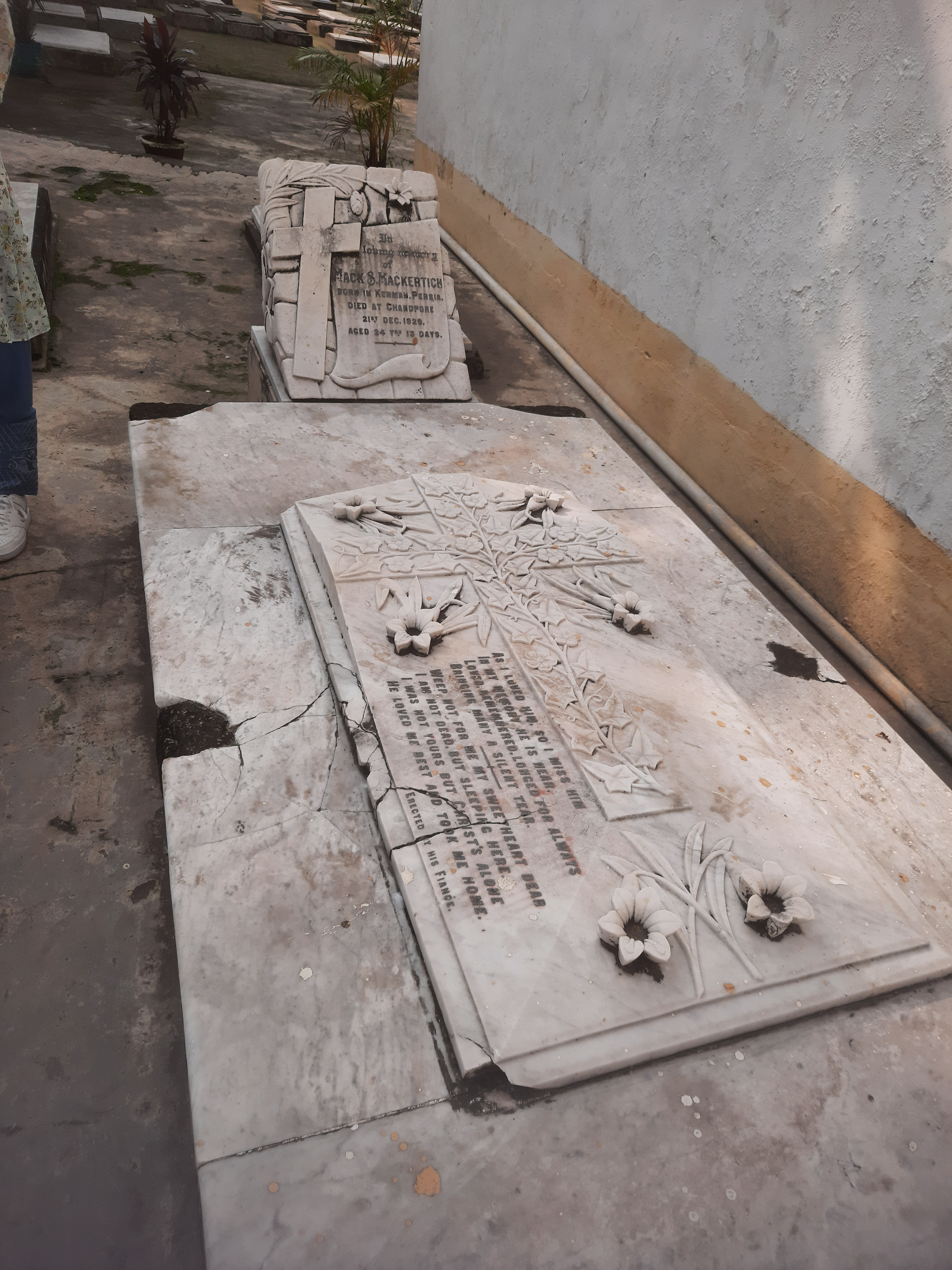
Epitaph (Photos taken in 2023)

List of Old Dhaka Heritage Sites

== See also ==
- Armenian architecture
- Armenian Apostolic Church
- Christianity in Bangladesh
