= Dhaka Collegiate School =

- Logo of Dhaka Collegiate School, Dhaka

Location
- 1, Loyal Street; Sadarghat; Dhaka, Dhaka 1100; Bangladesh; 23.707728°N 90.410757°E

Information
- Former name: Dhaka English Seminay
- Type: Public boys high school
- Motto: আল্লাহ্‌ আমাদের সহায় (God is our Patron)
- Established: June 21, 1835; 191 years ago
- Founder: British Raj under the East India Company
- School board: Board of Intermediate and Secondary Education, Dhaka
- Authority: Directorate of Secondary and Higher Education
- Session: January–December
- School number: EIIN: 108124
- Headmaster: Kazi Golam Sabbir (Acting)
- Gender: Boys
- Language: Bangla
- Campus: Old Town
- Colors: White (Shirt and Shoes) and Dark Blue (Trousers and Sweater)
- Mascot: An open book with a single eye, in which an everlasting flame of knowledge burns.
- Yearbook: "ঐতিহ্য"
- Annual tuition: ৳48–৳180
- Tuition: ৳4–৳15
- Former pupil(s): Collegiatian(s)
- Website: http://www.dhakacollegiateschool.edu.bd/

Dhaka Collegiate School is a secondary school in Dhaka, Bangladesh. It is one of the oldest schools in Bangladesh. The students of the Dhaka Collegiate School are called Collegiatian or in short DCSian

== History ==
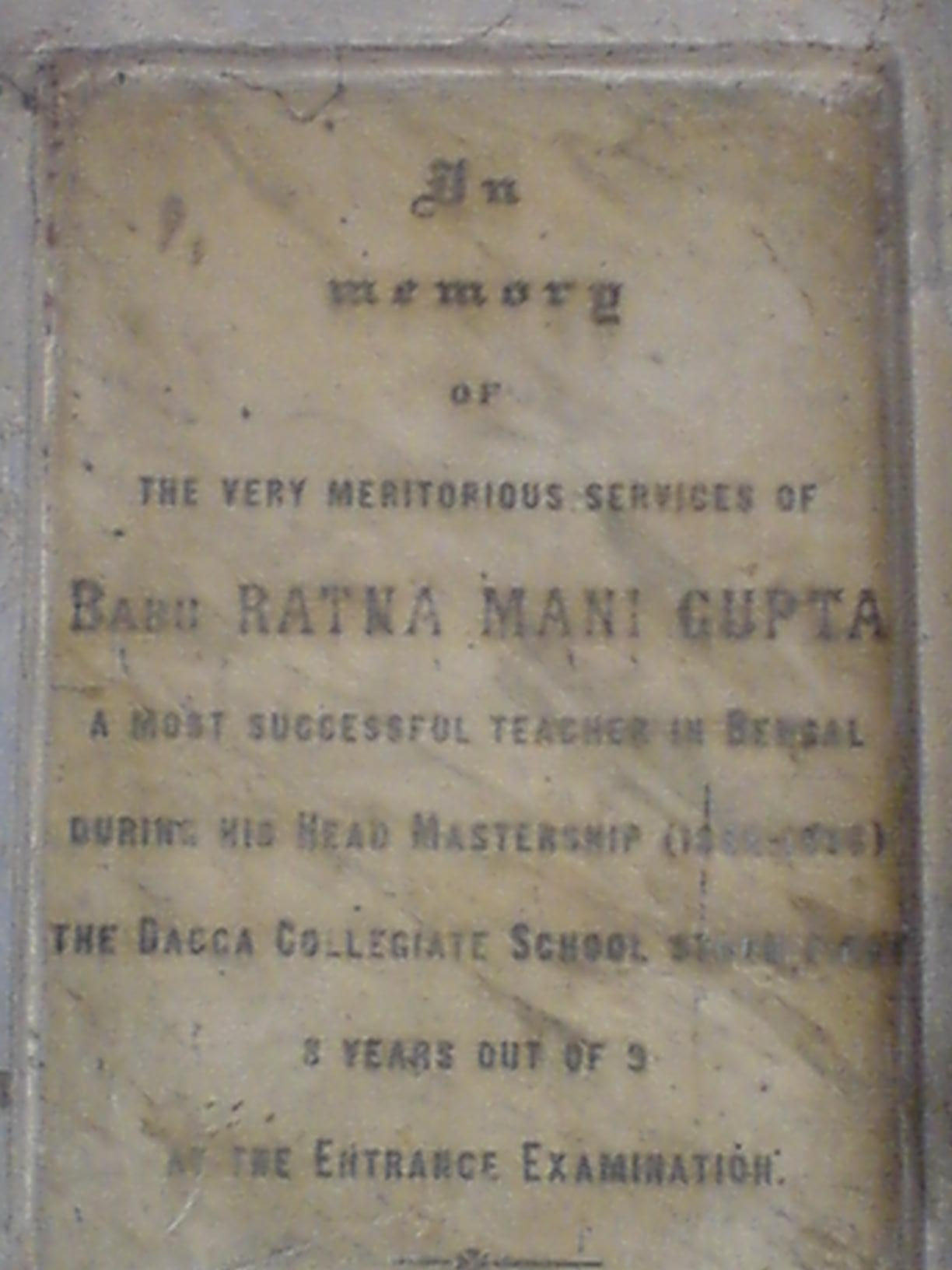
Dhaka Collegiate School

The school was established in Dhaka on 21 June 1835 as Dhaka English Seminary. It was the first government high school established by the British under the East India Company in the Bengal province for teaching English literature and science. This was later named as Dhaka Collegiate School. Mr. Redge, an English missionary, acted as the first head master of the school. In its first batch it had Nawab of Dhaka Khwaja Abdul Ghani as a student.

The foundation of Dhaka Intermediate College later to be known as Dhaka College was laid down in 1841. The school separated from the college in 1908. Since then it has been the Zilla School of Dhaka, although it continues to be called Dhaka Collegiate School.

This institution has delivered many famous alumni in its history.

== Location ==
The school is located in Sadarghat crossing, west of Bahadur Shah Park and south of Jagannath University, on the banks of the Buriganga River. Behind the School campus is Shumona Hospital.

== Architecture ==
The campus of Dhaka Collegiate School originally centered around a primary academic structure, later known as the "Puraton Bhaban" (Old Building). This building served as the hub for both administrative and academic activities. Over time, the campus expanded with the construction of three additional structures: the "Hall Bhaban", the "Biggan Bhaban" and the "Notun Bhaban" (New Building). After government had passed the gadget of redevelopment of the decaying Campus Buildings, Two of the original structures, including the historic Puraton Bhaban and Hall Bhaban, were demolished to make way for modernized facilities. Currently, the "Mul Bhaban" and "Biggyan Bhaban" remain the two standing structures from the previous era. Recently a new, multi-story academic building on the site of the former "Hall Bhaban" has been completed, but classes are not being held in the building. As the building has not been formally inaugurated.

== Courses ==
The school offers courses in science, and Business Studies and classes conducted in two shifts (morning and day).

== Headmasters and headmistresses ==
- Mr. Ridge (1835–1839)
- Mr. Sinclaire (1839–1841)
- Mr. Pratt (1841)
- Mr. Carsil (1848)
- Mr. E. U. Good (1863–1865)
- Mr. Babu U. C Datta
- Mr. Goon
- Mr. W. B. Livingstone
- Mr. Leigh Fever (1872)
- Mr. Babu K. C. Ghosh (1873–1884)
- Mr. Babu I. C. Bose
- Mr. Rai Sahib R. M. Gupta (1888–1896)
- Mr. Babu B. M. Sen (1897-1902)
- Mr. Babu R. K. Das (1903–1910)
- Mr. Babu B. K. Bose (1910–1914)
- Mr. Babu Abhaya Charan Das (1914–1919)
- Mr. Khan Bahadur Tassaduq Ahmad (1919–1927)
- Mr. Khan Bahadur Badiur Rahman (1927–1932)
- Mr. Rai Saheb J. M. Datta (1932–1935)
- Mr. Babu J. C. Datta (1935–1943)
- Mr. Babu B. K. Bhattacharya (1943–1944)
- Mr. M. O. Goni (1944–1945)
- Dr. Enamul Haque (1945–1948)
- Dr. Enamul Haque (1948–1950)
- Mr. S. M. Sadaruddin (1950–1951)
- Mr. A. A. Mahmud (1951–1952)
- Mr. Abid Ali (1952–1954)
- Mr. M. S. A. R. B. Kader (1954–1956)
- Mr. Sahabuddin (1956)
- Mr. M. A. K. Bhuiyan (1956–1958)
- Mr. Qazi Ambor Ali (1958–1959)
- Mr. Sufi Hussein Ali (1959)
- Mr. T. Hossain (1961–1965)
- Mr. M. A. K. Bhuiyan (1966–1967)
- Mr. Hafizuddin Ahmed (1967–1970)
- Mr. Md. Abdur Razzaq (1970)
- Mr. A. A. Khalilur Rahman (1972–1975)
- Mr. M. A. Motaleb (1975–1976)
- Mr. Md. Mizanur Rahman Bhuiyan (1976–1978)
- Mr. Shamsul Alam Chowdhuri (1978–1987)
- Mr. Mostafizur Rahman (1987–1990)
- Mr. Md. Sekandar Ali Khalifa (1990–1992)
- Mrs. Monzil Ara Ahmed (1992–1996)
- Mr. Md. Motiur Rahman (1996–1999)
- Mrs. Syeda Zinnatun Noor (2000–2001)
- Mr. Md. Anwar Hossain (2001–2007)
- Mr. Abdul Malek Mia (2007)
- Mr. Ali Akkas Ahmed (Acting)(2007–2008)
- Mrs. Rowshon Ara (Acting)(2008–2010)
- MD. Farid Uddin (2010–2012)
- A.K.M. Mostafa Kamal(2012–2013)
- MD. Khaleque (2013–2014)
- MD. Abu Sayed Bhuiya (2014–2019)
- MD.Ariful Islam (2019–2024)
- Md. Aminul Haque (2025-2025)
- [Acting] Smt. Kabita Rani Bhowmik (2025-2026)
- [Acting] Kazi Golam Sabbir (2026-2026)
- MD. Mostofa Mahmud (2026-present)

== Notable alumni ==
- Bir Shreshtho Matiur Rahman, Muktijoddha (freedom fighter)
- Jagdish Chandra Bose, physicist and inventor
- Buddhadeb Bosu, poet of Bengali literature
- Khorshed Alam, former governor of Bangladesh Bank
- Salahuddin Ahmed, former governor of Bangladesh Bank
- Meghnad Saha, physicist
- Raisul Islam Asad, Muktijoddha (freedom fighter) and national award-winning actor
- Kabir Chowdhury, former president of Bangla Academy
- Munier Chowdhury, linguist, martyred intellectual
- A.M. Harun-ar-Rashid, physicist
- Khwaja Abdul Ghani, Nawab of Dhaka
- Moulvi Abdul Ali, zamindar based in Dhaka
- Mustafa Kamal, Chairman of the Law Commission, former Chief Justice of Bangladesh
- Khan Ataur Rahman, film director
- Alamgir Kabir, film director
- Nicholas Pogose, founder of Pogose School
- Tabarak Husain, diplomat
- Syed Shamsul Haque, writer of Bengali literature
- Ainun Nishat, water resource and climate change specialist, serving as a professor emeritus of BRAC University
- Dinesh Gupta, Famous Indian Revolutionary

== In contemporary literature ==
- In Satyajit Ray's Popular Detective Series Feluda, Mentions Pradosh Chandra Mitter aka Feluda's Father late Jay Krishna Mitter was a teacher of mathematics and Sanskrit at Dhaka Collegiate School.
