= S. M. Kamaluddin =

Bangladeshi businessman (born 1943)

- এস. এম. কামালউদ্দিন
- Education: Civil engineering
- Alma mater: Bangladesh University of Engineering and Technology
- Known for: Concord Group

S. M. Kamaluddin (Bengali: এস. এম. কামালউদ্দিন) is a Bangladeshi entrepreneur. He is the chairman of Concord Group, a conglomerate in Bangladesh. The company operates mainly in four business areas, including construction, real estate, building materials, and entertainment and hospitality.

== Early life and education ==
He graduated in civil engineering from Bangladesh University of Engineering and Technology in 1964.

== Career ==
Kamaluddin contributed to Bangladesh's construction industry by establishing a construction company. He founded Concord Construction Co. as a small proprietorship company in 1972. The company's first work was rebuilding seven bridges on the Dhaka-Chattogram highway due to the damages from the 1971 Liberation War. In 1976, Kamaluddin converted Concord Construction Co. to Concord Engineers & Construction Limited. Since then, the company has completed projects including National Martyrs' Memorial, Hazrat Shahjalal International Airport, World Trade Centre in Chattogram, Comcentre in Singapore under his leadership. He introduced the theme park concept in Bangladesh with Fantasy Kingdom in Ashulia. It was the country's biggest theme park.

Kamaluddin is the founder life member of North South University's trustee board. He is also the founding president of the Korea-Bangladesh Chamber of Commerce & Industry.
