= Concord Group =

Bangladeshi conglomerate

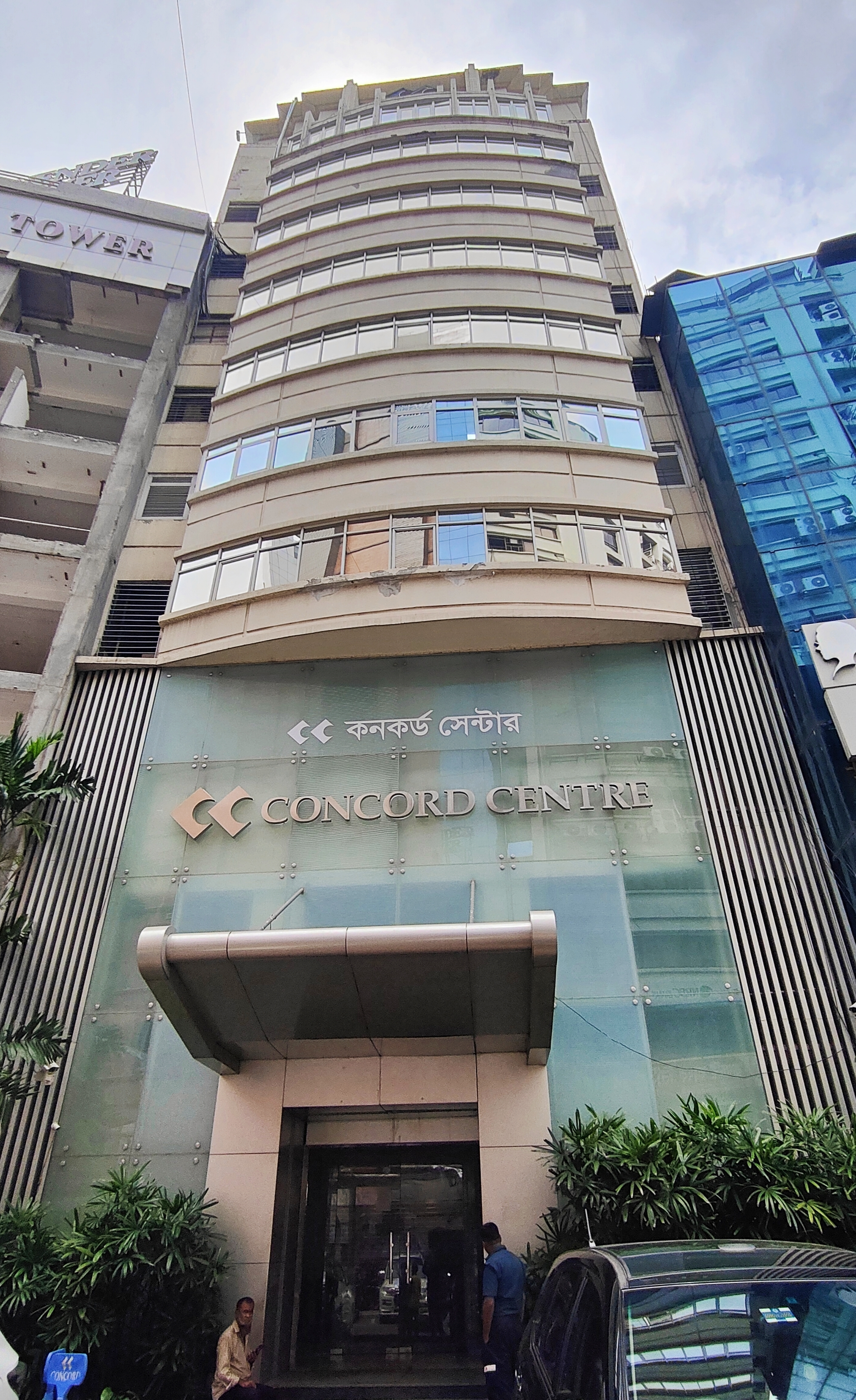
- Concord Group's Head Office at Gulshan 2
- Established: 1973; 53 years ago
- Type: Private limited company
- Location: Concord Centre, Gulshan, Dhaka, Bangladesh
- Coordinates: 23°47′42.662″N 90°24′48.254″E
- Fields: Construction; Real estate; Building products; Architectural design; Interior design; Communications; Entertainment industry; Land Development; Hospitality industry; Garments
- Key people: S. M. Kamaluddin (Chairman); Shahriar Kamal (Managing Director)
- Subsidiaries: Concord Engineers & Construction Ltd.; Concord Real Estate & Building Product Ltd.; Concord Condominium Ltd.; Concord Real Estate & Development Ltd.; Concord Entertainment Co., Ltd; Concord Ready-Mix & Concrete products Ltd.; Concord Architects & interior Décor Ltd.; Concord Architects & interior Décor Ltd.; Concord Prestressed Concrete & Block Plants Ltd.; Concord Lands Ltd.; Concord Consortium Ltd.; Concord Communication Co. Ltd.; Concord City Development Ltd.
- Employees: 2500
- Website: Concord Group; Concord Real Estate

Concord Group is a Bangladeshi conglomerate that was founded in 1973. The industries under this conglomerate include construction, real estate, architecture & design, communication, entertainment, hospitality, and garments.

== History ==
Concord Group was founded in 1973. In 2002, Concord Group built a multimillion-dollar amusement park in Savar called Fantasy Kingdom. In 2004, the Government of Bangladesh leased the historic Foy's Lake to Concord Group for 50 years to develop it into a resort and amusement park named Foy's Lake Concord. In 2007, Concord Group began construction work on a shopping Complex called Police Plaza, which was built in partnership with the Bangladesh Police Welfare Trust of the Bangladesh Police. The building is located in Gulshan Thana and was completed in 2015.

They set up the first satellite township in Bangladesh and constructed the country's first revolving tower in Chittagong. They constructed 7 world-class theme parks in Bangladesh including Fantasy Kingdom & Foy's Lake Complex. They introduced new technology involving reinforced concrete block masonry to serve as a better structural system for earthquake-prone zones.

== Controversy ==
The Department of Environment fined Concord Group 1.4 million taka for building 12-story and two 15-story buildings without their permission.

On 17 September 2015, the Bangladesh High Court requested that Concord hand over an 18-story building built on land occupied by the Salimullah Orphanage; said court determined that the contract used to acquire the land was illegal.

== Awards ==
Concord Group won the 2010 BID International Quality Summit (IQS) Award in New York based on "Excellence, Innovation, Customer Satisfaction, Technology, Leadership Strategic Planning & Business Results". They also received the Daily Star - DHL Bangladesh Business Award in the category: "Enterprise of the year 2000' in recognition of "Outstanding Leadership Quality and as Role model in Corporate Business in Bangladesh.” In 2022, they won a National Environment Medal for their contributions to environment protection and pollution control in Bangladesh.

== Projects ==
The group's main business is real estate & construction. This organization has developed over 1,200 residential, Commercial property projects by 2023, including, private property, autonomous property, government projects and monuments.

Notable Projects by Concord Group
Project Name	Project Type	Address	Construction		Architect	Authority	References
Project Name	Project Type	Address	Start date	End date	Architect	Authority	References
National Martyrs' Memorial	Monument	(Bangladesh) Savar, Dhaka	1982	1982	Syed Mainul Hossain	Government of Bangladesh	
Main passenger terminal & VVIP terminal buildings of Dhaka International Airport	Airport	(Bangladesh) Kurmitola, Dhaka		1983		Civil Aviation Authority of Bangladesh (CAAB)	
Singapore City Telecommunication Center Building	Commercial building	Singapore		1986	BEP Akitek Sdn Bhd	Singapore Telecommunications Limited	
Bangladesh Shilpa Bank Bhaban	Commercial building	(Bangladesh) Motijheel, Dhaka	1980	1983	Syed Mainul Hossain	Government of Bangladesh	
Janata Bank Bhaban	Commercial building	(Bangladesh) Motijheel, Dhaka		1985	Syed Mainul Hossain	Janata Bank	
Jiban Bima Tower	Commercial building	(Bangladesh) Motijheel, Dhaka		1983		Jiban Bima Corporation	
Shaheed Suhrawardy Indoor Stadium	Indoor stadium	(Bangladesh) Mirpur, Dhaka					
BTV auditorium	Auditorium	(Bangladesh) Rampura, Dhaka					
Titas Gas Bhaban	Commercial building	(Bangladesh) Kawran Bazar, Dhaka					
IDB bhaban	Commercial building	(Bangladesh) Agargaon, Dhaka					
Fantasy Kingdom	Amusement park	(Bangladesh) Savar, Dhaka					
Foy's Lake	Amusement park	(Bangladesh) Chattogram, Dhaka					
Shaheed Zia Memorial Complex and Mini Bangladesh	Amusement park	(Bangladesh) Chattogram, Dhaka					
World Trade Center Chittagong	Commercial building	(Bangladesh) Chattogram, Dhaka	August 29, 2006	January 30, 2016		Chittagong Chamber of Commerce & Industry (CCCI)	

== List of companies and establishment dates ==
1. Late 1972: Concord Construction Co
2. 1976-02-10 : Concord Engineers & Construction LTD
3. 1983-03-05 : Jeacon Garments LTD
4. 1988-07-31 : MNK Marbel & Tiles Technology LTD
5. 1989-01-26 : Bangladesh Gypsum Products (pte) LTD
6. 1989-01-28 : Modern Furniture & Interior Décor (pte) LTD
7. 1989-02-12 : MNK Chemicals and Home Services LTD
8. 1989-04-03 : Concord Condominium LTD
9. 1990-07-29 : Concord Ready-Mix & Concrete Products LTD
10. 1991-06-20 : Concord Fashion Export LTD
11. 1994-28-04 : Concord Architects & Interior Décor LTD
12. 1997-04-05 : Concord Real Estate & Building Products LTD
13. 1999-05-09 : Concord Real Estate & Development LTD
14. 2000-01-06 : Concord Pre-stressed Concrete & Block Plant LTD
15. 2001-02-01 : Concord Entertainment Co. Ltd
16. 2003-06-29 : Concord Architects & Engineers LTD
17. 2003-08-03 : Concord Communication Co LTD
18. 2008-01-03 : Concord Consortium LTD
19. 2008-06-19 : Concord City Development LTD

== See also ==
- List of companies of Bangladesh
