= Fantasy Kingdom =

Entertainment complex in Savar, Dhaka, Bangladesh

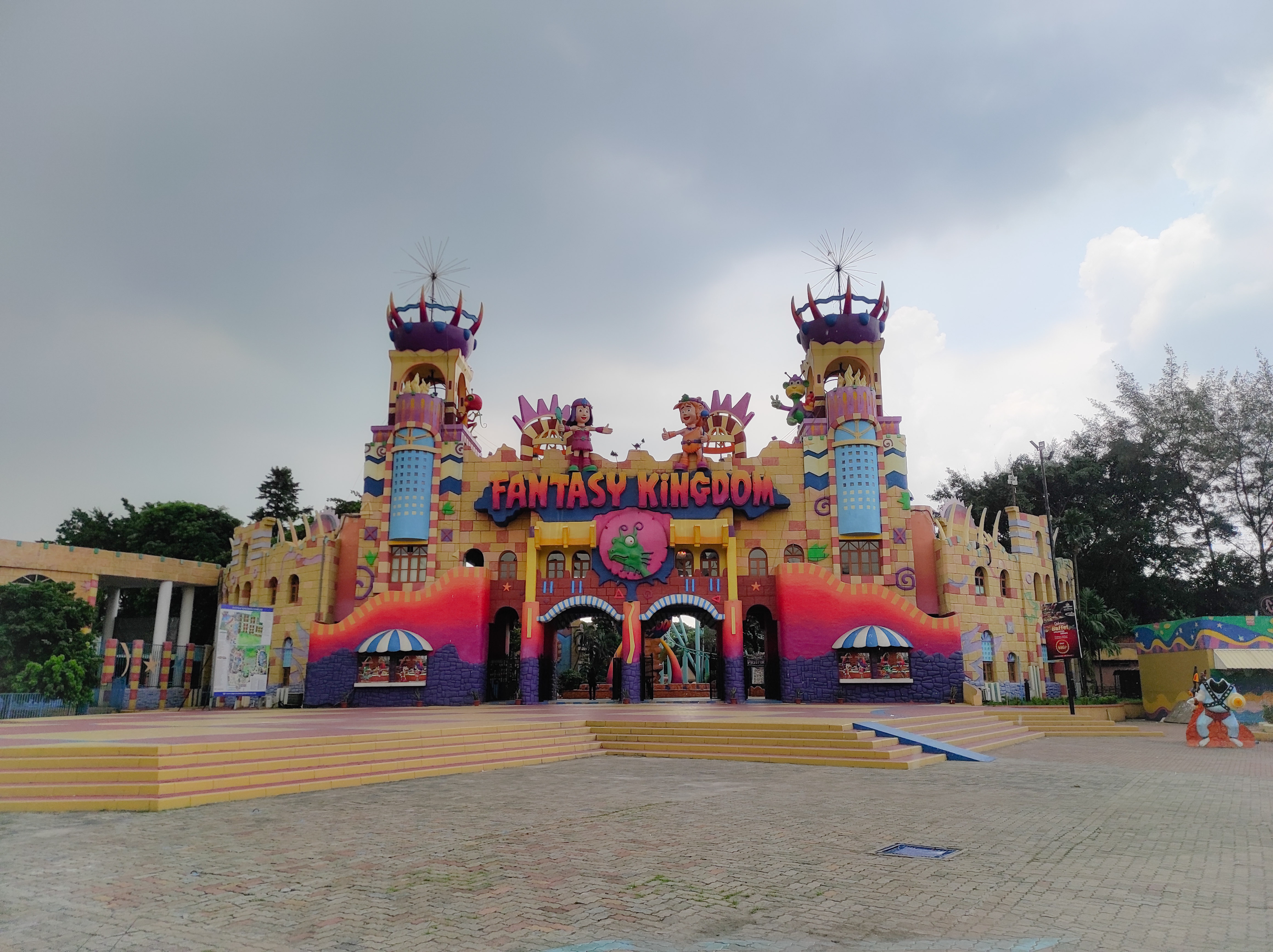
- Fantasy Kingdom Front Gate
- Native name: Fantasy Kingdom
- Industry: Amusement park; Theme Park
- Founded: February 19, 2002; 24 years ago
- Founders: Concord Group
- Headquarters: Dhaka - Ashulia Hwy, Jamgora, Ashulia, Savar, Dhaka 1349
- Area served: Dhaka; Bangladesh
- Key people: SM Kamaluddin (Chairman); Shahriar Kamal (Managing Director)
- Products: Water Kingdom; Xtreme Racing Go-Kart; Heritage Park Dhaka; Resort Atlantis
- Number of employees: 500
- Parent: Concord; Foy's Lake
- Website: https://fantasykingdom.net

Fantasy Kingdom is an amusement park complex in Ashulia, Savar, Dhaka, Bangladesh. Opened on 19 February 2002, the theme park is owned and operated by Concord Entertainment Co. Ltd, a sister concern of Concord Group. The property covers nearly 20 acres (81,000 m^{2}), featuring one theme park, one water park, a Go-Kart Track, and Heritage park Corner.

== Locations ==
Fantasy Kingdom is located in Dhaka, specifically in Jamgora within Ashulia. This area is part of the Dhaka District that covers Ashulia and Savar. Fantasy Kingdom can be reached using various routes.

== Attractions ==
=== List of rides ===
Fantasy Kingdom Theme Park has around 24 rides:

- Bumper Car
- Zuzu Train
- Whirly Bird
- Highway Convoy
- Giant Splash
- Happy Kangaroo
- Izzy Dizzy
- Sun & Moon
- 3D Cinema
- Bull Dozer
- Santa Maria
- Kids' Bumper Car
- Magic Carpet
- Pony Adventure
- Roller Coaster
- Speed Way
- Vortex Tunnel
- Sky Hopper
- Bumper Boat
- Zip Around
- Igloo House
- Moving Tower
- Ferris Wheel
- Junior Ferris Wheel
- Redemption Game

The most recent attractions (Rock n Roll and 9D Cinema) were added in 2019.

== In popular culture ==
Fantasy Kingdom was featured during the final song in the 2014 Bangladeshi movie Akash Koto Dure.

== See also ==
- Tourism in Bangladesh
- Concord Group
- List of hotels and resorts in Bangladesh
- Foy's Lake Concord
