= Foy's Lake Concord =

Amusement park in Bangladesh

Foy's Lake Concord Amusement World
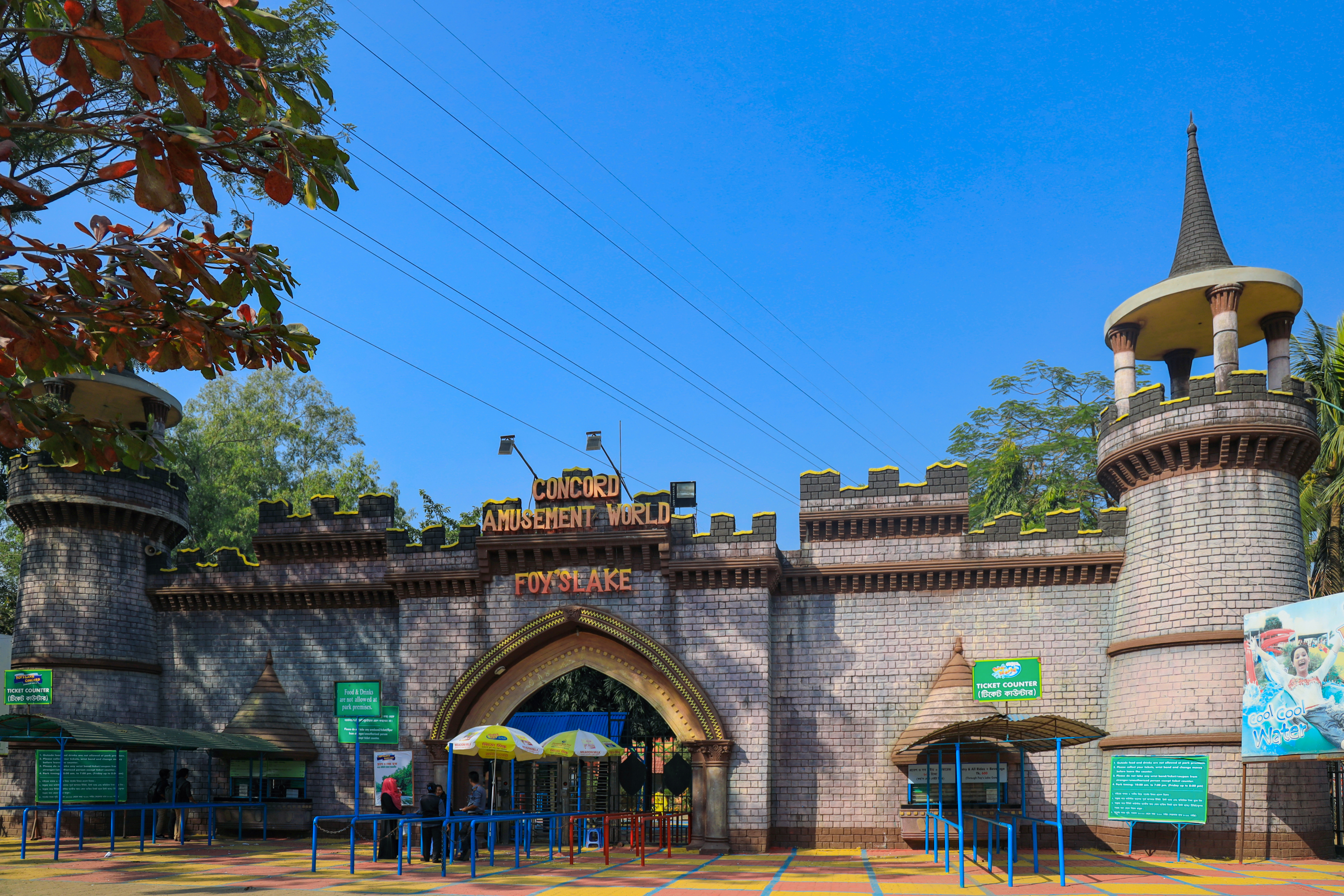
- Foy's Lake Concord Entry Gate
- Native name: Foy's Lake Park
- Industry: Amusement Parks; Theme parks
- Founded: February 19, 2004; 22 years ago
- Founders: Concord Group
- Headquarters: Foy's Lake, Zakir Hossain Rd, Chattogram 4201
- Area served: Chittagong; Bangladesh
- Products: Foy's Lake Theme Park; Sea World Water park; Foy's Lake Resort
- Website: foyslake.com

Foy’s Lake Concord Amusement World is an amusement park in Bangladesh, located at Foy’s Lake in the Pahartali neighborhood of Chittagong. It was established on 19 February 2004 by Concord Entertainment Company Limited, a leading entertainment and real estate company in Bangladesh. The complex covers nearly 320 acres (130 ha) of land and consists of three main components: a dry theme park, a water park, and a resort. The theme park complex is frequented by tourists and locals in Chittagong.

The dry theme park, also known as Foy’s Lake Concord Amusement World, is the largest and oldest part of the complex. It features rides and attractions including roller coasters, bumper cars, a Ferris wheel, a haunted house, 3D theater, and more. The dry theme park also hosts live shows, concerts, festivals, and other events throughout the year.

The water park, also known as Sea World Water Park, is the newest and most modern part of the complex. It features slides and attractions, including a wave pool, rain dance, water coaster and lazy river. The water park also has a food court, a souvenir shop, and a locker room.

The resort, also known as Foy’s Lake Resort, offers rooms and suites, as well as restaurants, banquet halls, conference rooms, and a spa.

== History ==
In 2004, Concord Entertainment Company Limited agreed to establish a theme park at Foy's Lake on about 320 acres (130 ha) of land owned by Bangladesh Railway, under a 50-year build–operate–transfer arrangement. They broke ground in November of that year. In the first five years, the company invested 1.6 billion Bangladeshi taka ($23.7M as of 2009) in the site.

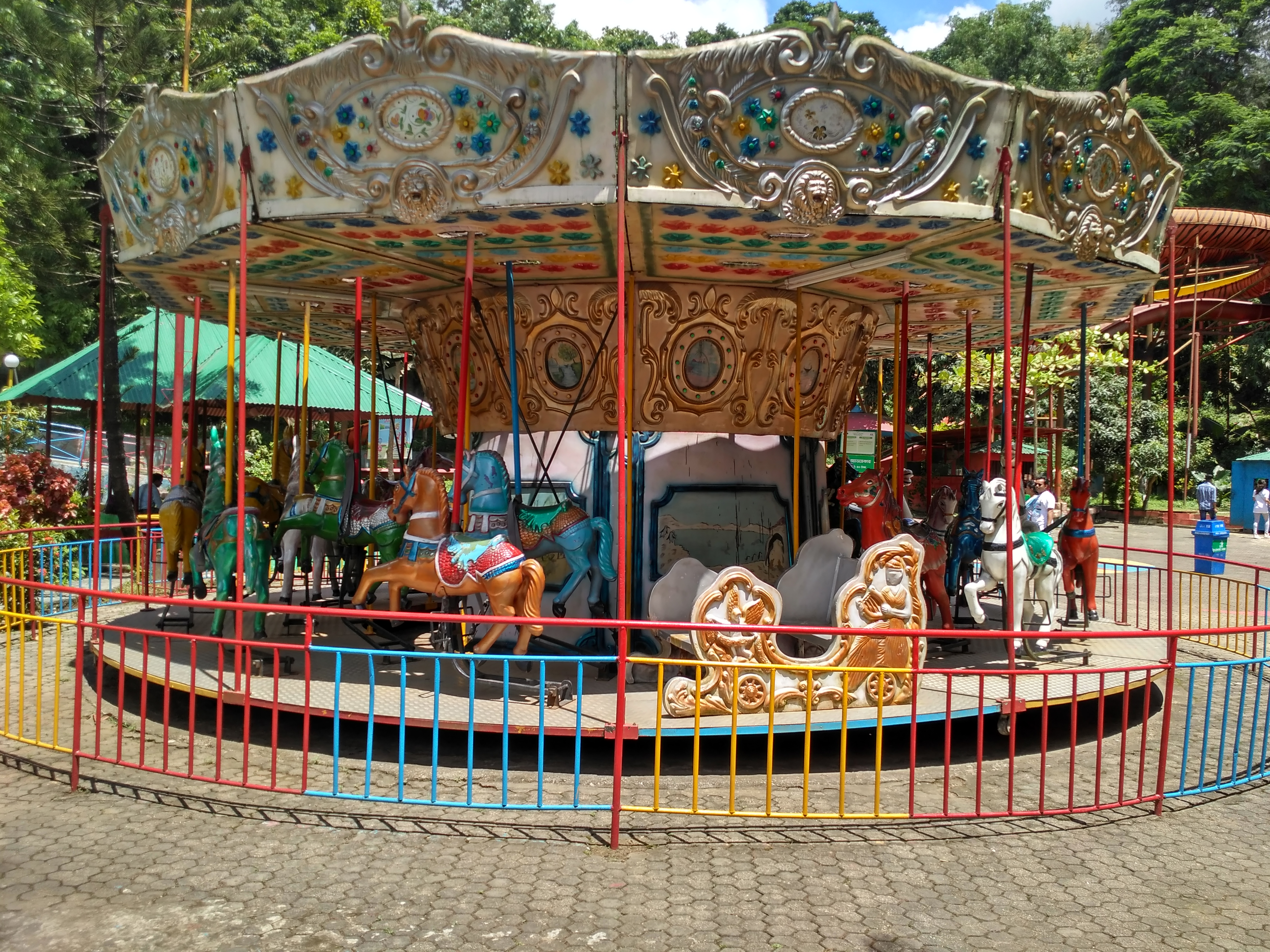
Baby carousel at Foy's Lake Concord Amusement World

As of 2018, Concord has reported a daily attendance of close to 5000 on holiday weekends, subject to weather conditions.

== Attractions ==
The complex consists of two theme parks and a resort. There are boating facilities and floating restaurants.

=== Foy's Lake Concord Amusement World ===
The dry park has shops and carnival rides such as a baby carousel, a family roller coaster, bumper cars, coffee cups, and a Ferris wheel.

=== Sea World Water Park ===
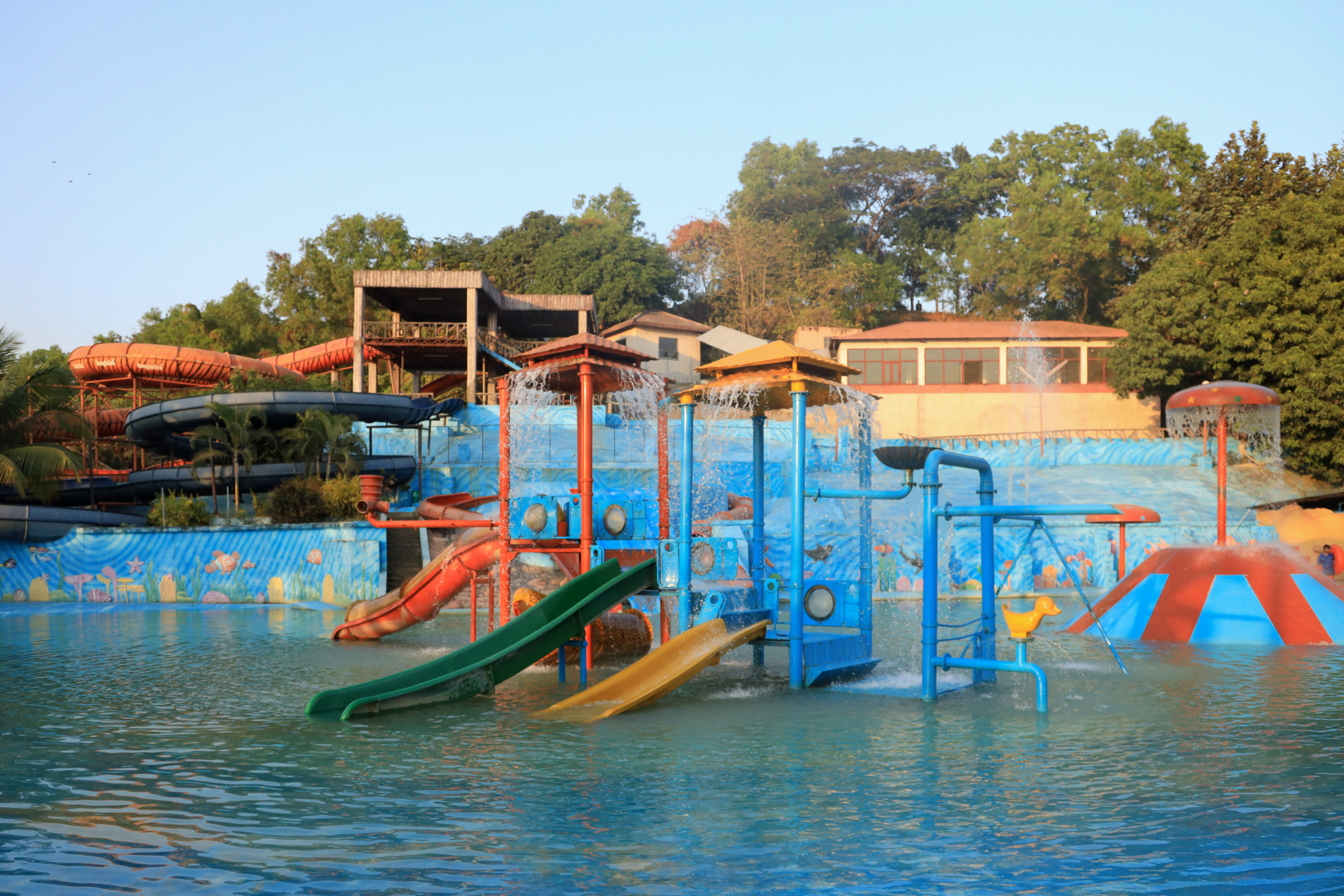
A pool at Sea World Concord

The water park has a wave pool, children's pool, splash pools, and water coaster rides.

=== Foy's Lake Resort ===
The resort has lakeside cottages and chalets. Bradt Travel Guides describes the resort as "geared primarily to the well-heeled domestic honeymooners seeking a lakeside escape for a day".

== See also ==
- Fantasy Kingdom
