= Jiban Bima Tower =

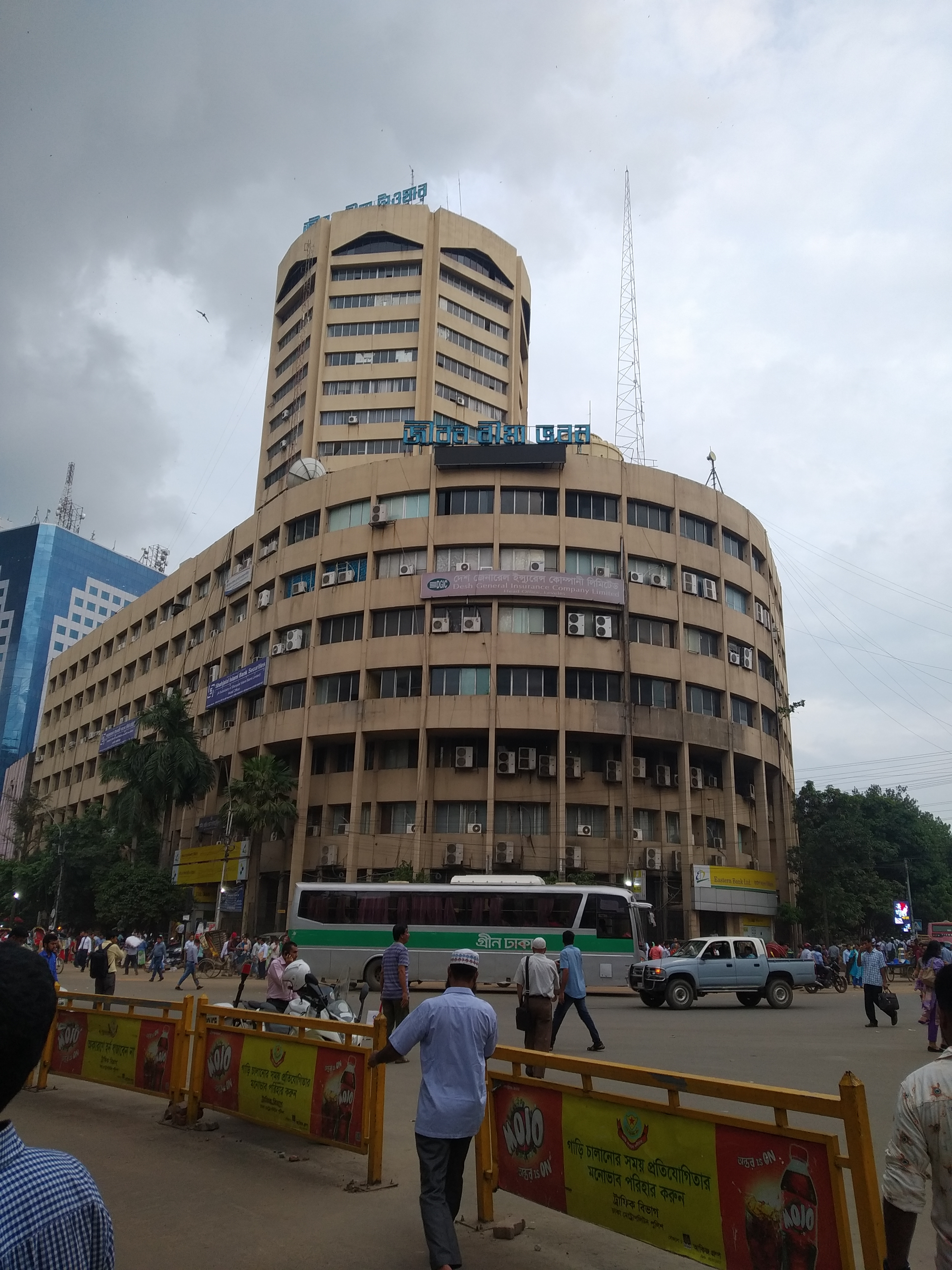
- Interactive map of the Jiban Bima Tower area

Record height
- Tallest in Bangladesh from 1983 to 1985^{[I]}
- Surpassed by: Eastern Federal Credit Union Insurance Building

General information
- Status: Completed
- Type: Office
- Location: Dilkusha, Motijheel, Dhaka, Bangladesh
- Coordinates: 23.727146°N 90.415559°E
- Construction started: 1983
- Completed: 1983
- Owner: Jiban Bima Corporation

Height
- Roof: 84.62 m (278 ft)
- Top floor: 21

Technical details
- Floor count: 21

Design and construction
- Developer: Concord Group

Jiban Bima Tower is a high-rise building located in Dhaka, Bangladesh. It is located in Motijheel, the central business district of the metropolis. It rises to a height of 84.62 m (278 ft) and comprises a total of 21 floors. Jiban Bima Bhaban is one of the tallest high-rises in Dhaka City. The background story of this building is covered in detail in this article. Currently the head office of Jiban Bima Corporation Bangladesh is not in this building. The building has various corporate offices. After 1975 the building was constructed by Concord Group.

== See also ==
- List of tallest buildings in Bangladesh
- List of tallest buildings in Dhaka
- Khuda Buksh
