= Salimullah Orphanage =

Historic orphanage in Bangladesh

Coordinates: 23.7225°N 90.3876°E

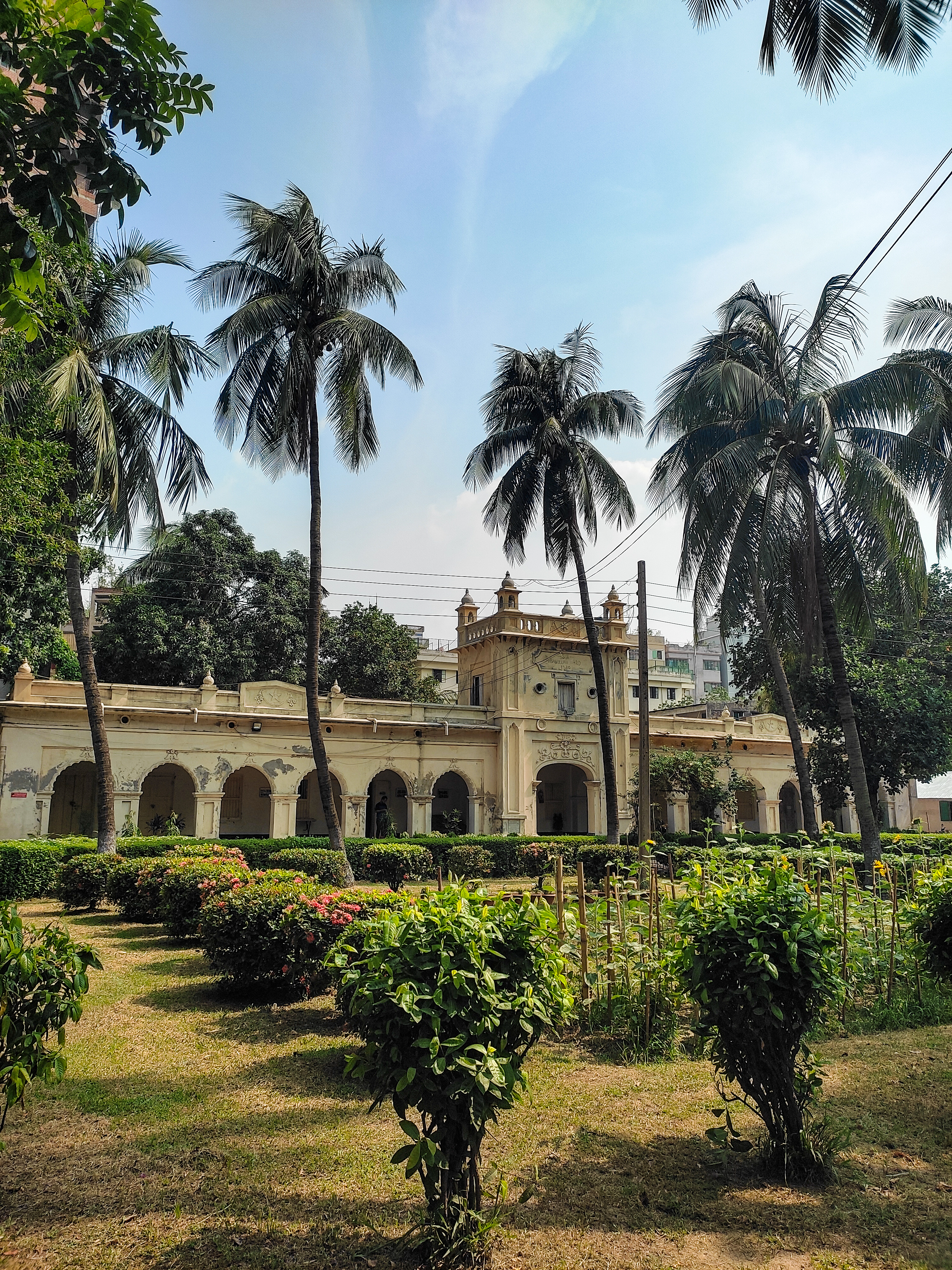
Sir Salimullah Muslim Orphanage

Salimullah Orphanage also known as Sir Salimullah Muslim Orphanage is a historic orphanage in Bangladesh founded by and named after Nawab Bahadur Sir Khwaja Salimullah.

== History ==
Salimullah Orphanage was established in 1907 as Islamia Orphanage by the Nawab of Dhaka, Nawab Sir Salimullah Bahadur. It was originally located near Ahsan Manzil in a rented building. The governor of Bengal, Thomas Gibson-Carmichael, 1st Baron Carmichael, visiting the orphanage in 1913, he donated one thousand rupees and land near Gore Shaheed Mosque of Amlapara. After the death of Sir Salimullah, the orphanage become known as Salimullah Orphanage. The government of Bangladesh nationalized the orphanage on 2 January 2008. Before the nationalization some land of the orphanage was sold in 2003 and corruption in management remains a major problem. On 17 September 2015 Bangladesh High Court ordered Concord Group to hand over an 18-storey building in Azimpur to Salimullah Orphanage, that the court ruled was illegally built on land owned by the orphanage.

== Gallery ==
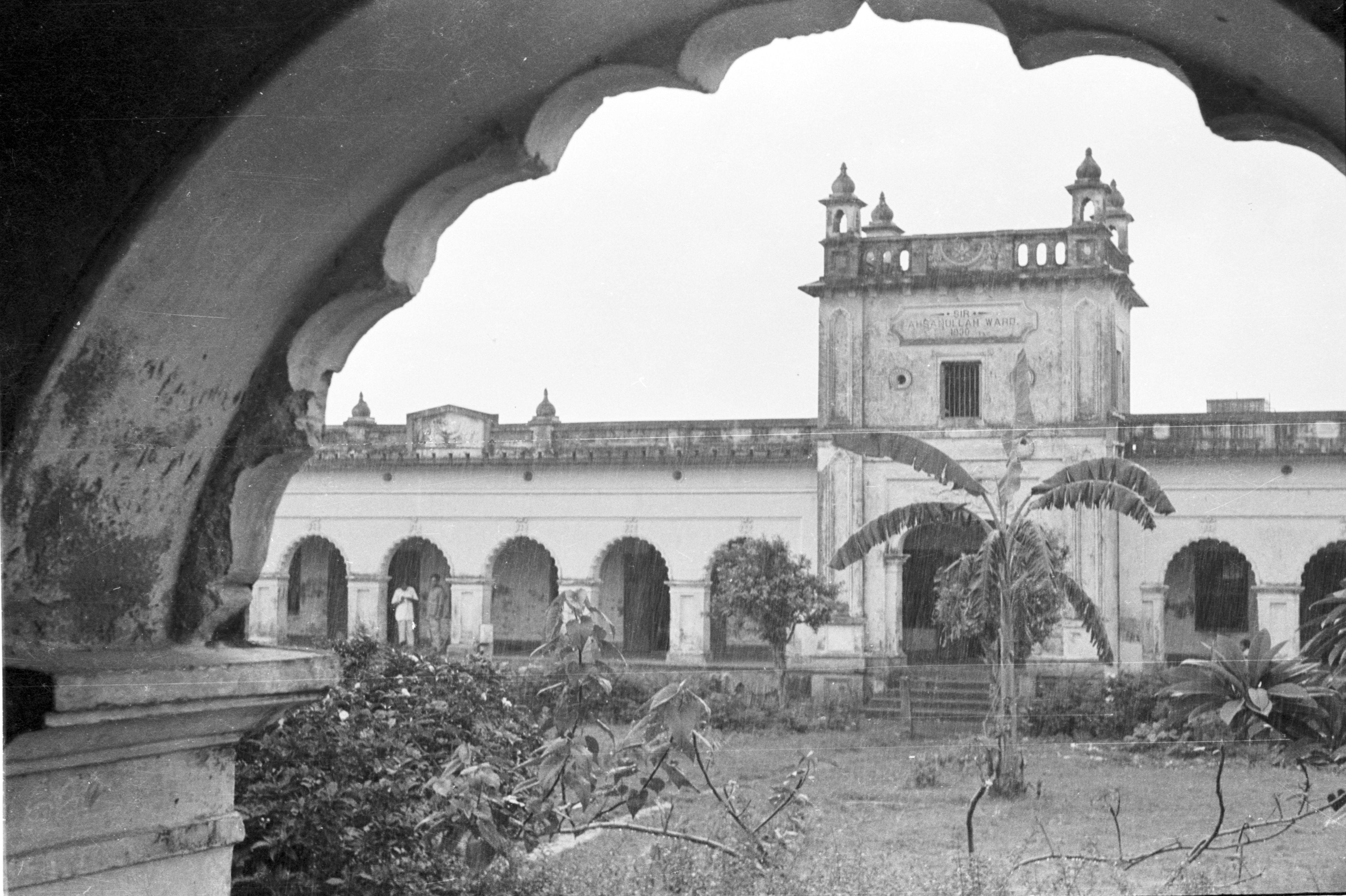
Inner courtyard of the orphanage (1966)

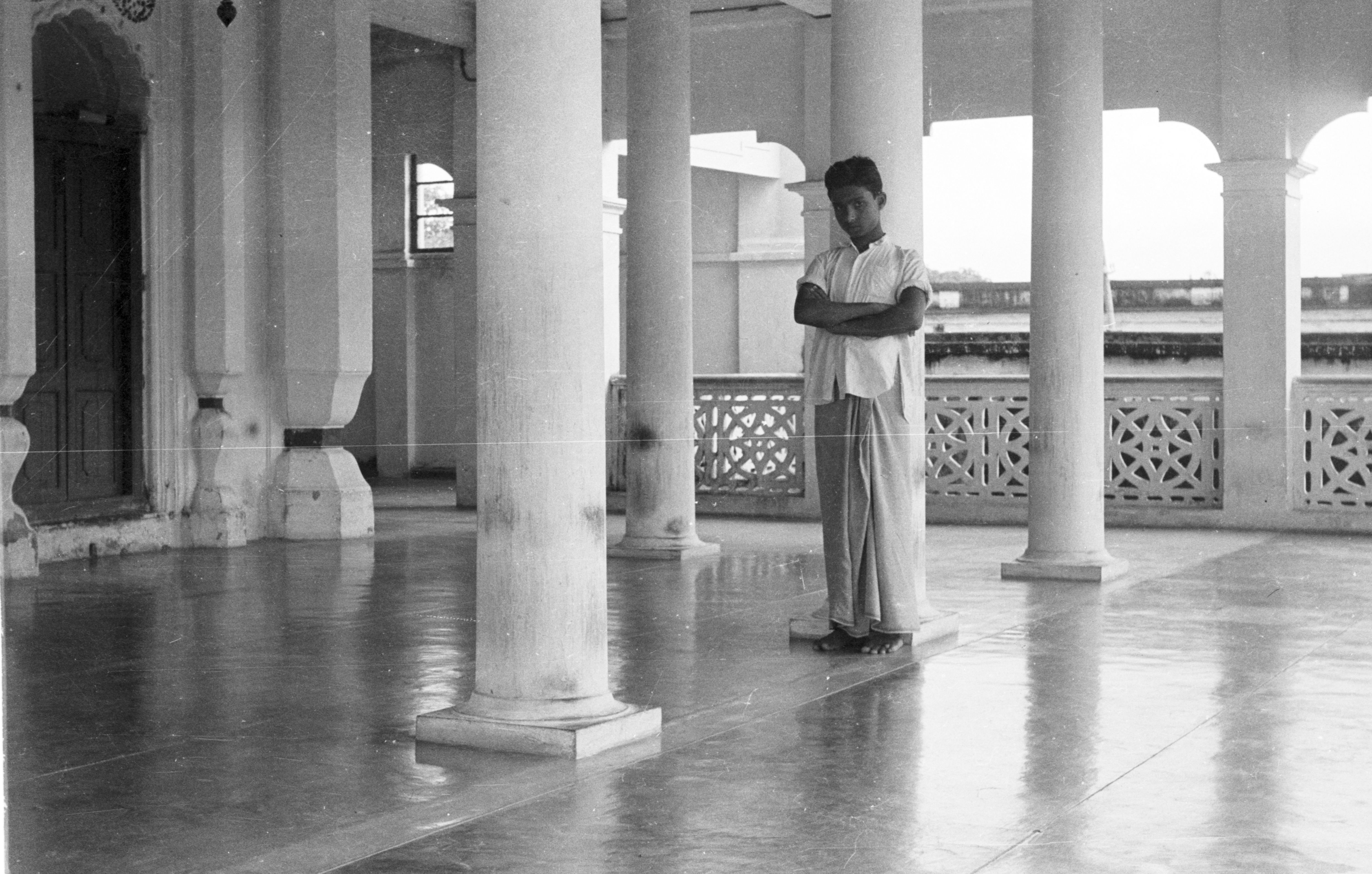
Prayer hall of the orphanage (1966)

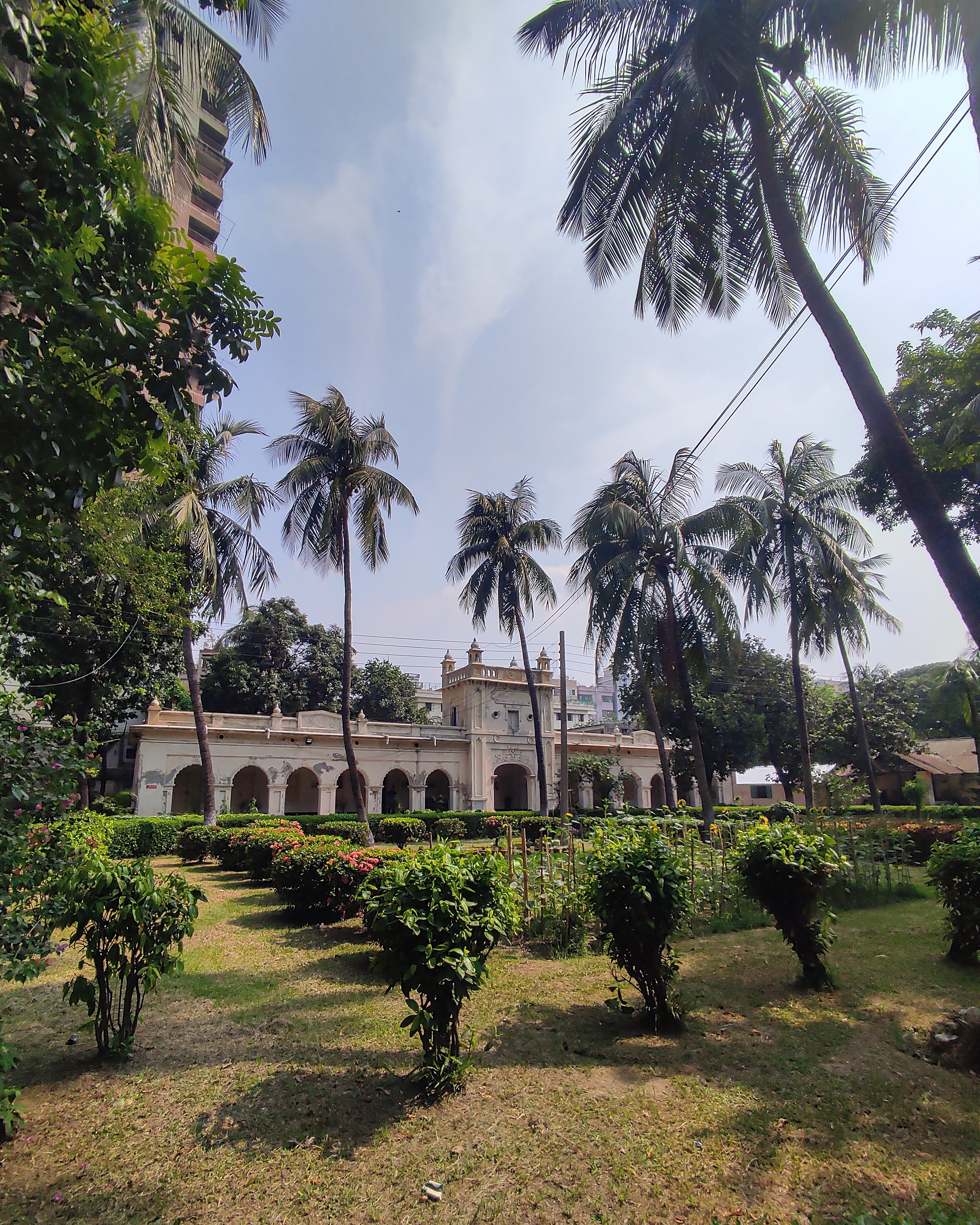
Orphanage building (2023)

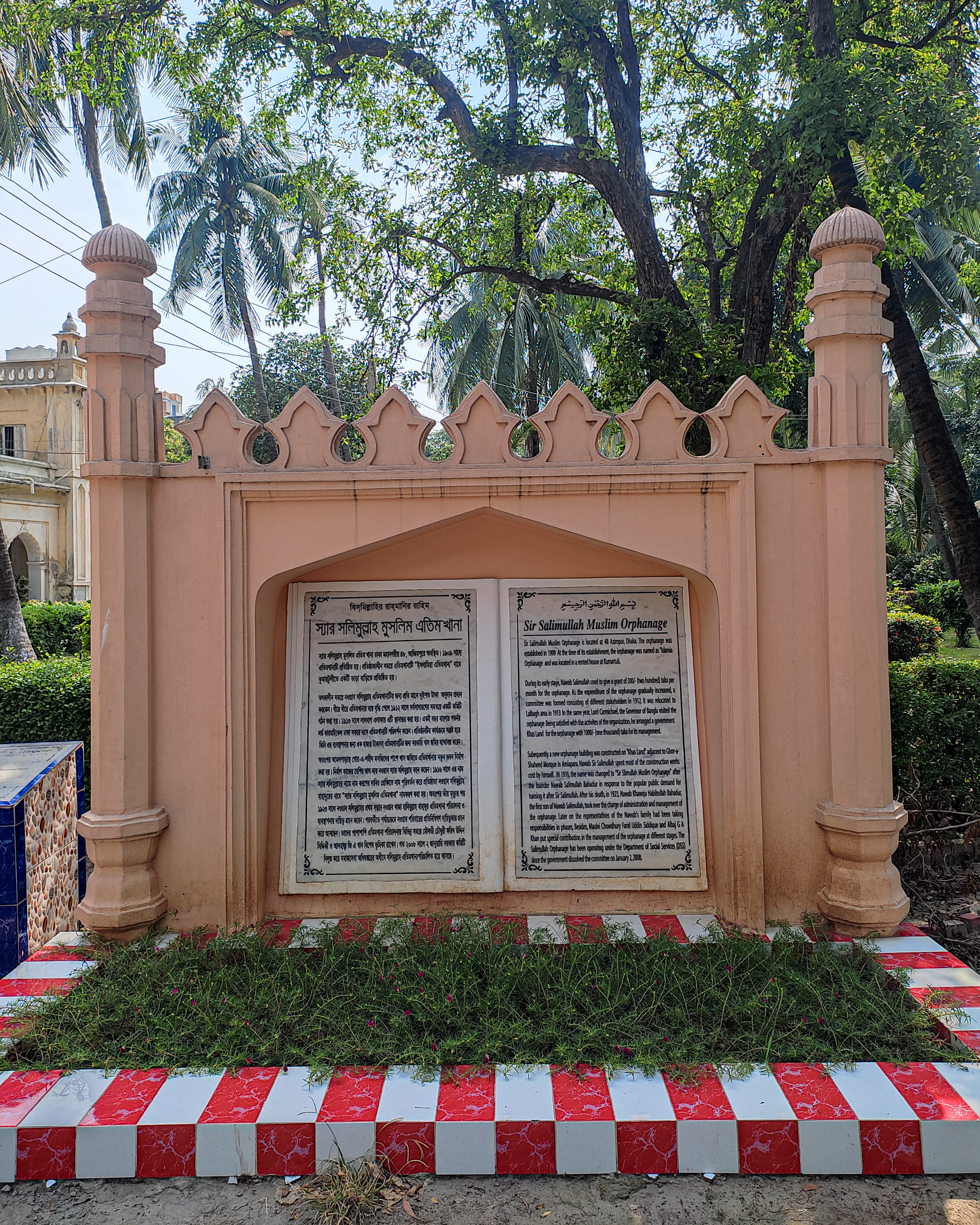
Plaque
