= Foy's Lake =

Reservoir in Chittagong

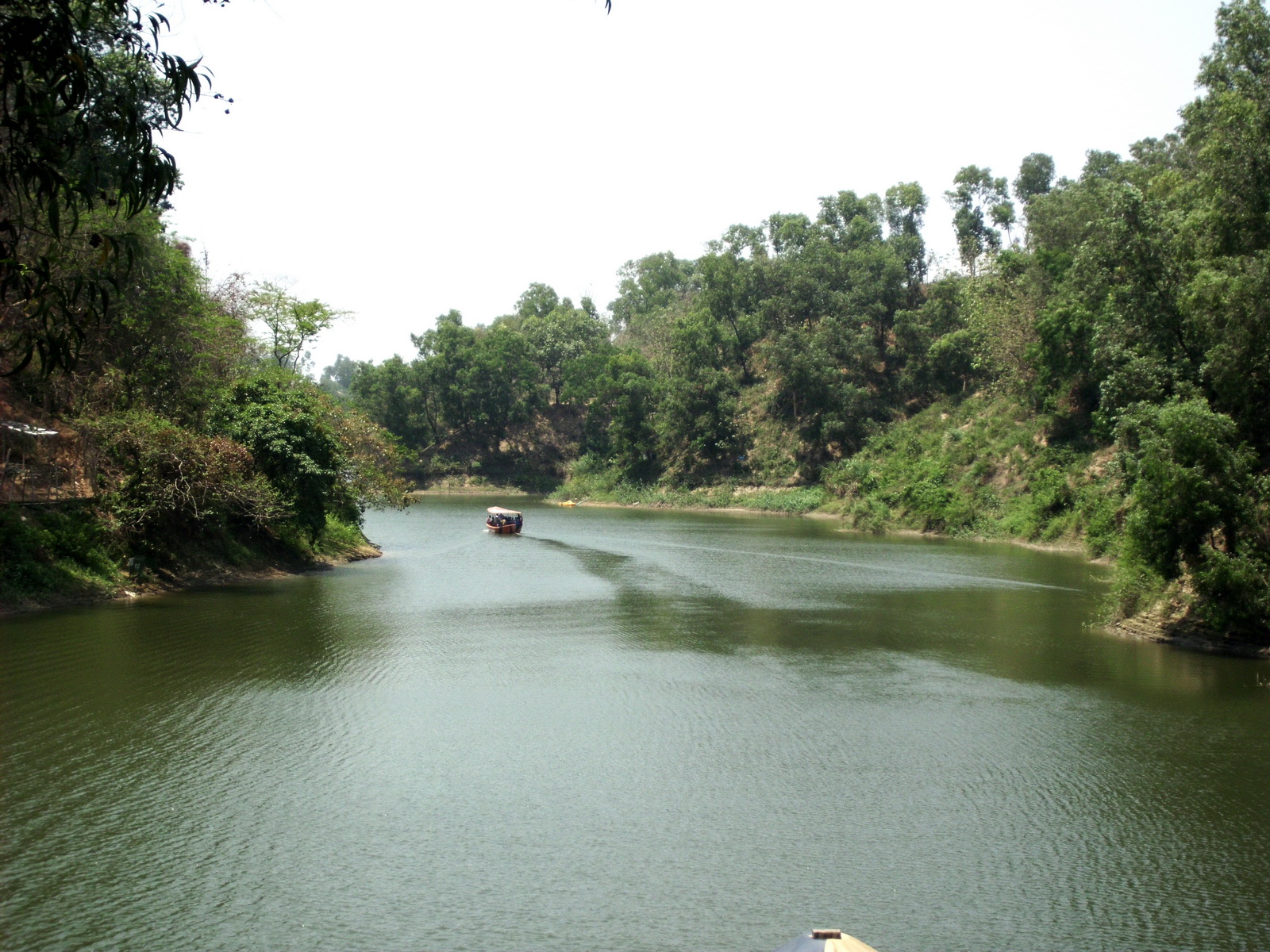
- Boat on lake

- Location within Bangladesh
- Location: Chittagong
- Coordinates: 22.3724°N 91.7928°E
- Type: reservoir
- Basin countries: Bangladesh

Foy's Lake is a man-made lake in Chittagong, Bangladesh. It was created in 1924 by constructing a dam across the stream that came down from the hills in the northern part of Chittagong. The purpose of creating an artificial lake was to provide water to the residents of the railway colony. It was named after Mr. Foy, a Railway engineer, believed to materialize said project. Pahartali was essentially a railway town containing a workshop, yard, and shed. Presently, a carriage workshop, diesel workshop, loco shed, laboratory, stores, electric workshop, and school (established in 1924) are located here. A good number of railway employees reside in the nearby colony.

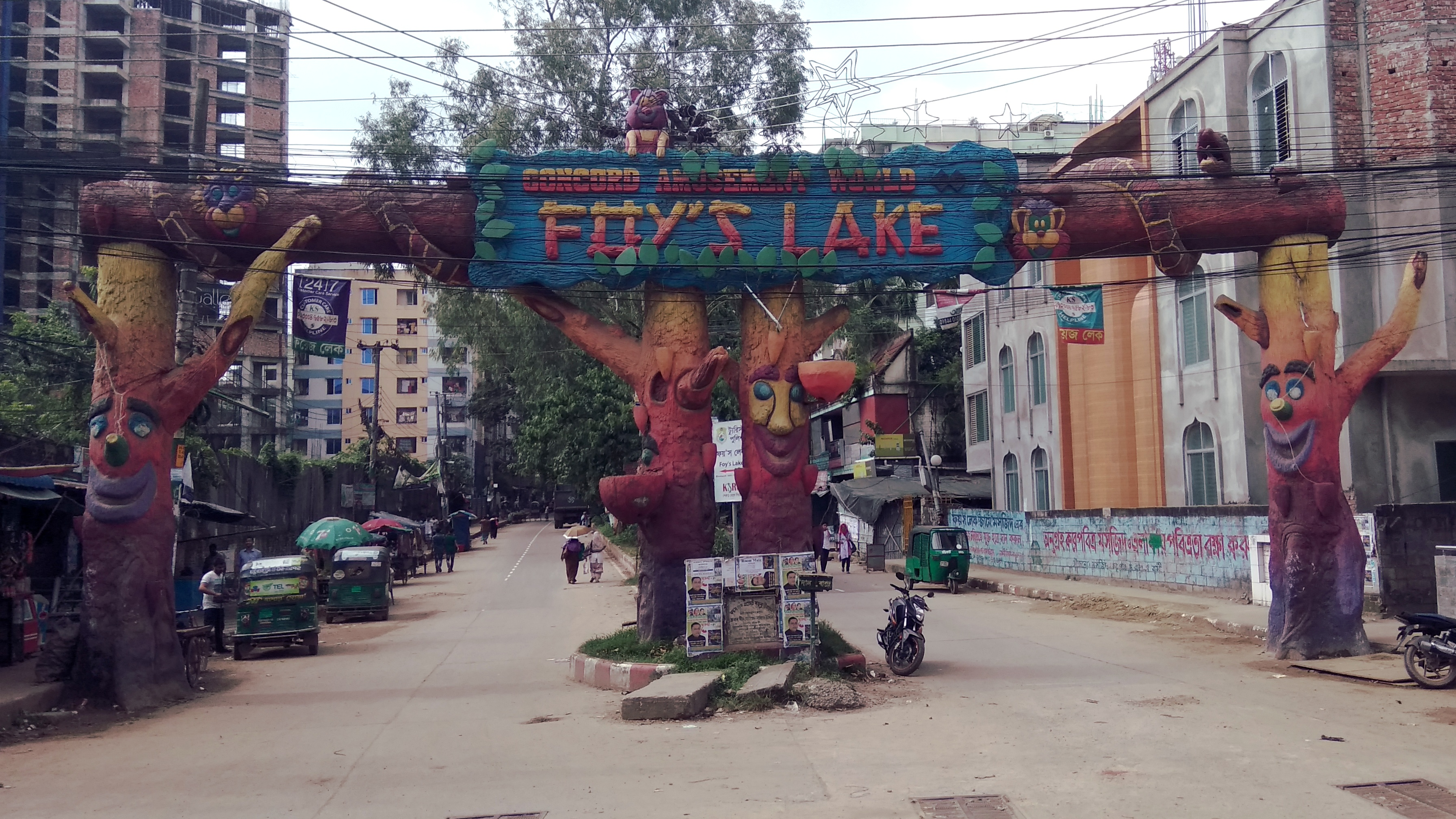
Concord groups gate to Foy's Lake, in the opposite direction of USTC

The area belongs to Railway. However, an amusement park, managed by the Concord Group, is located here.

== Gallery ==
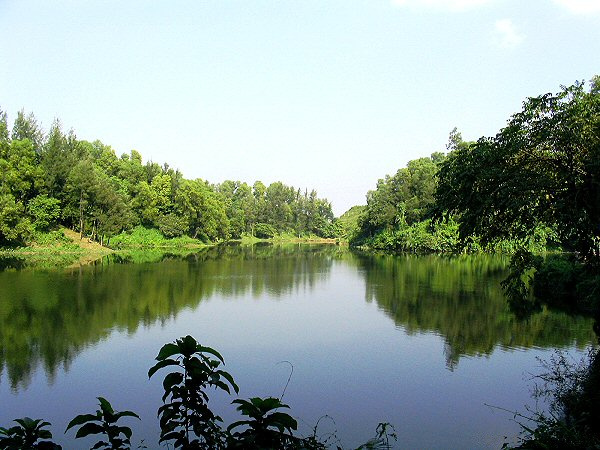

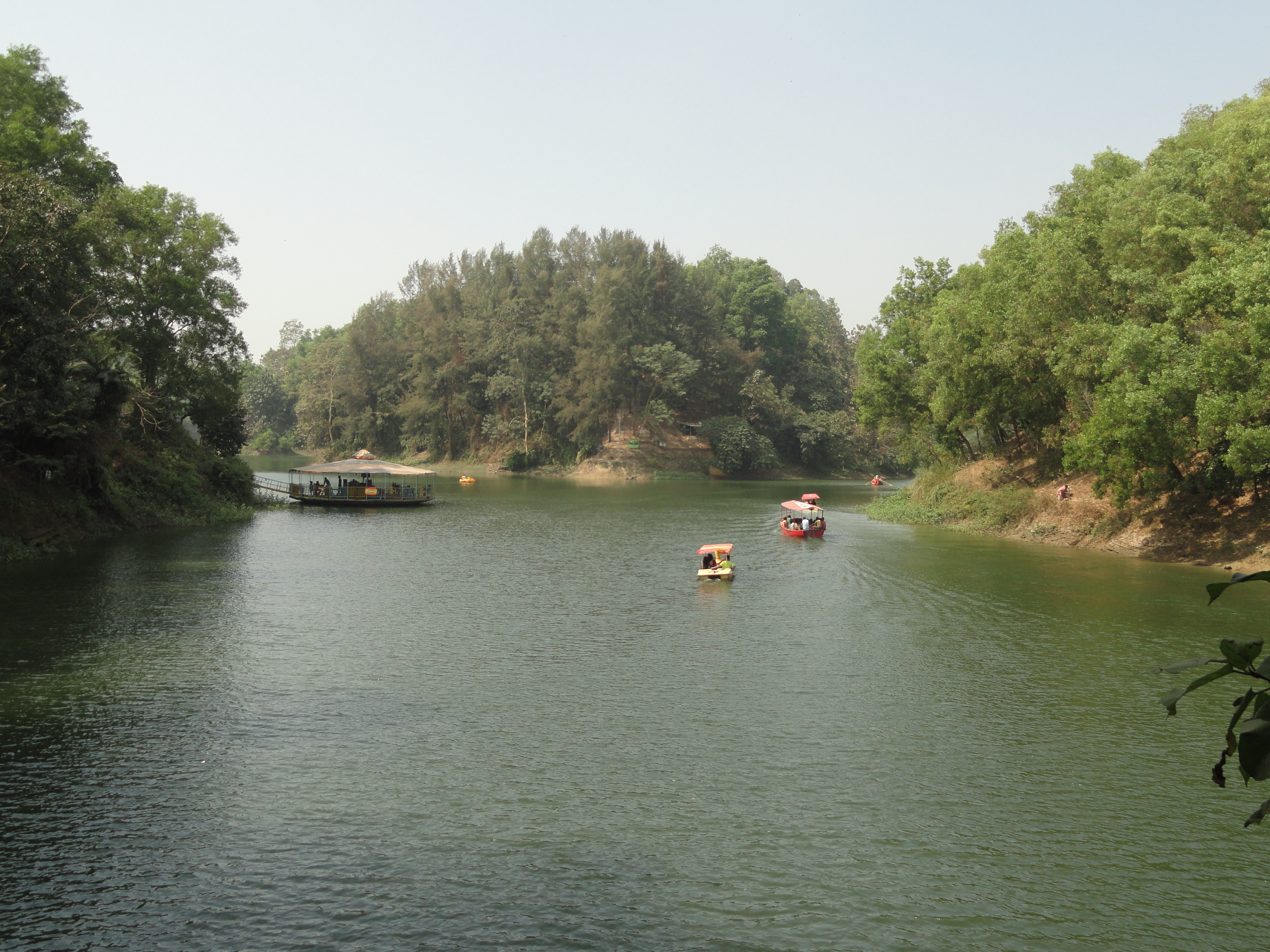

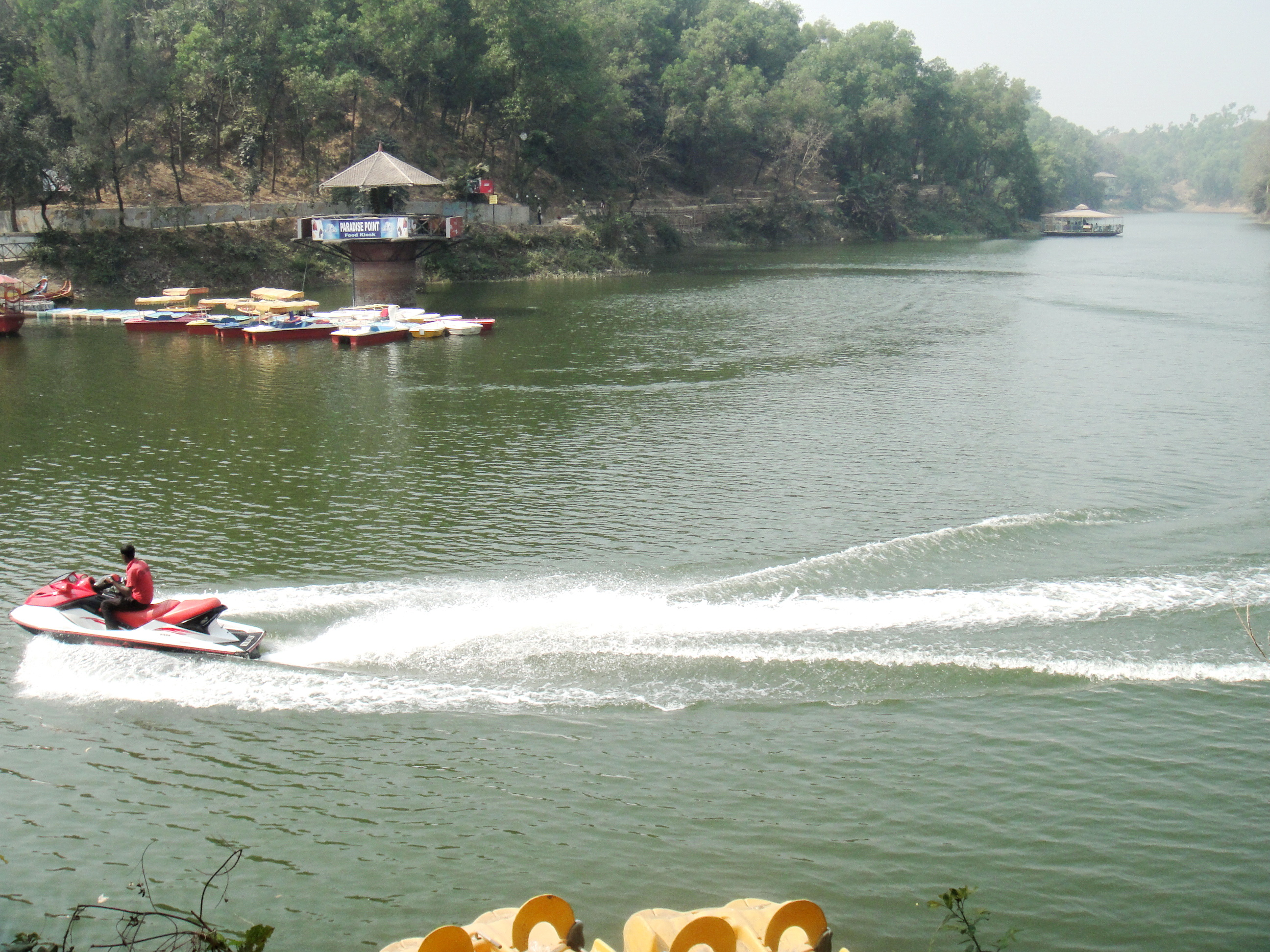

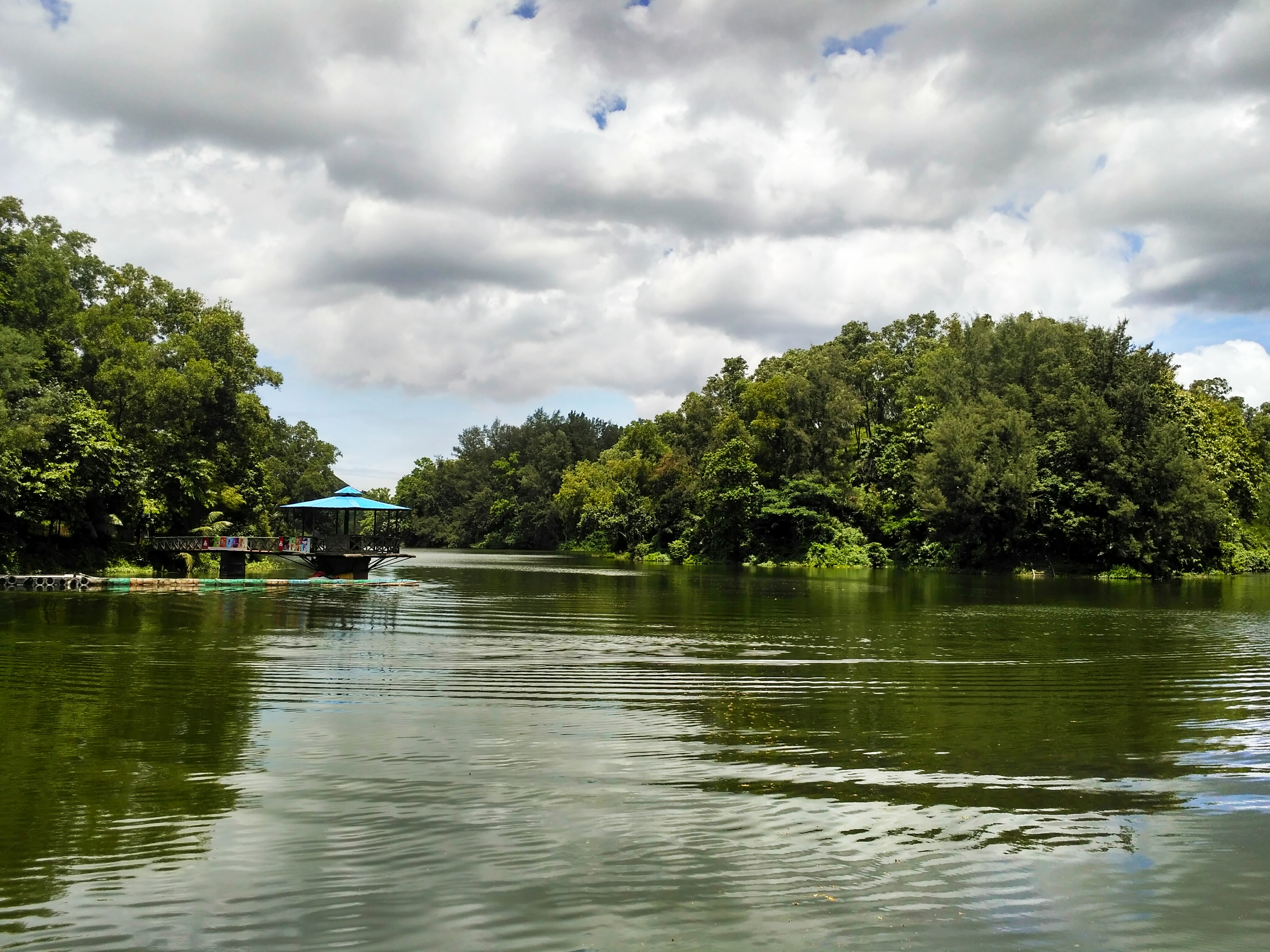

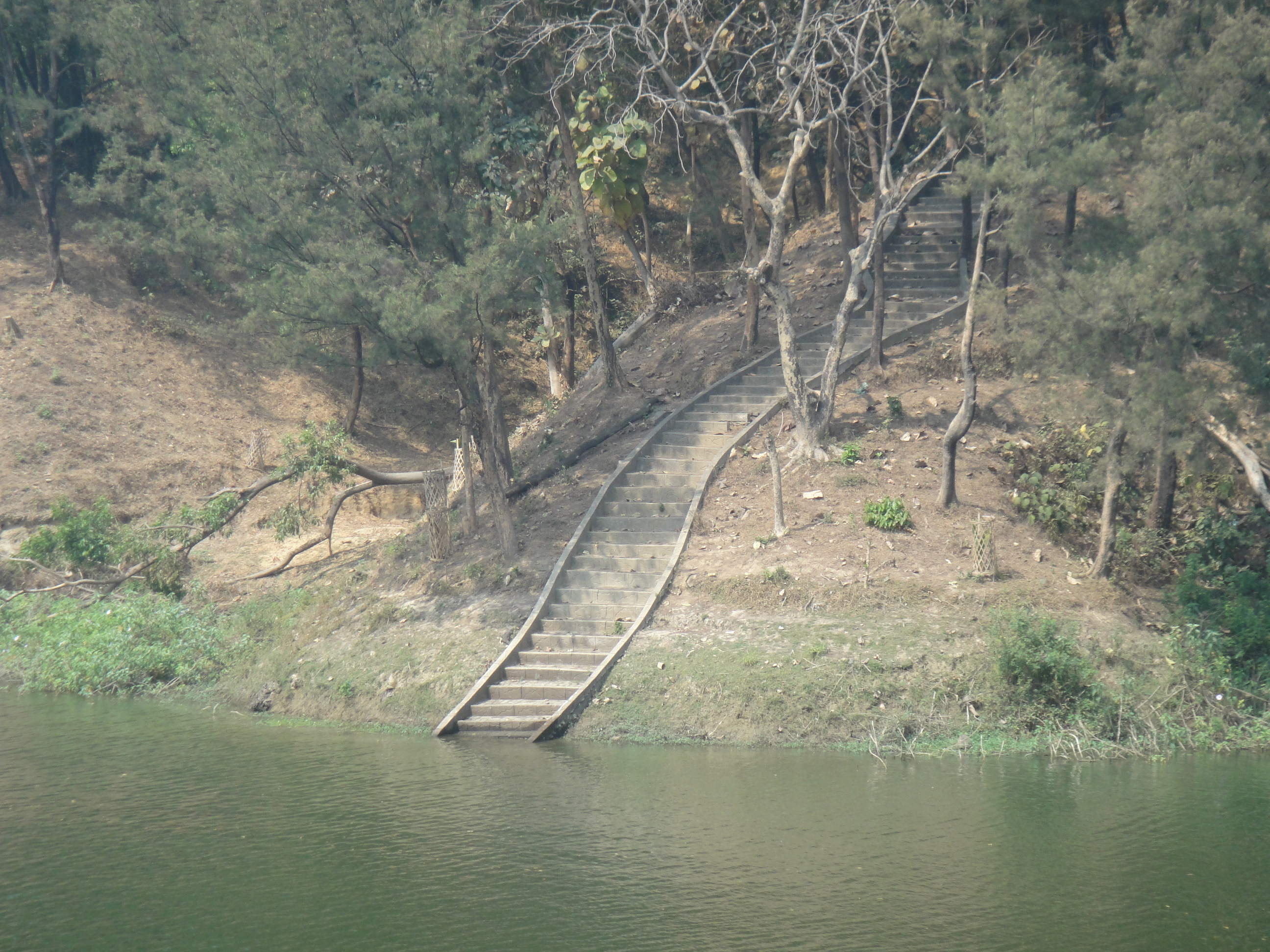

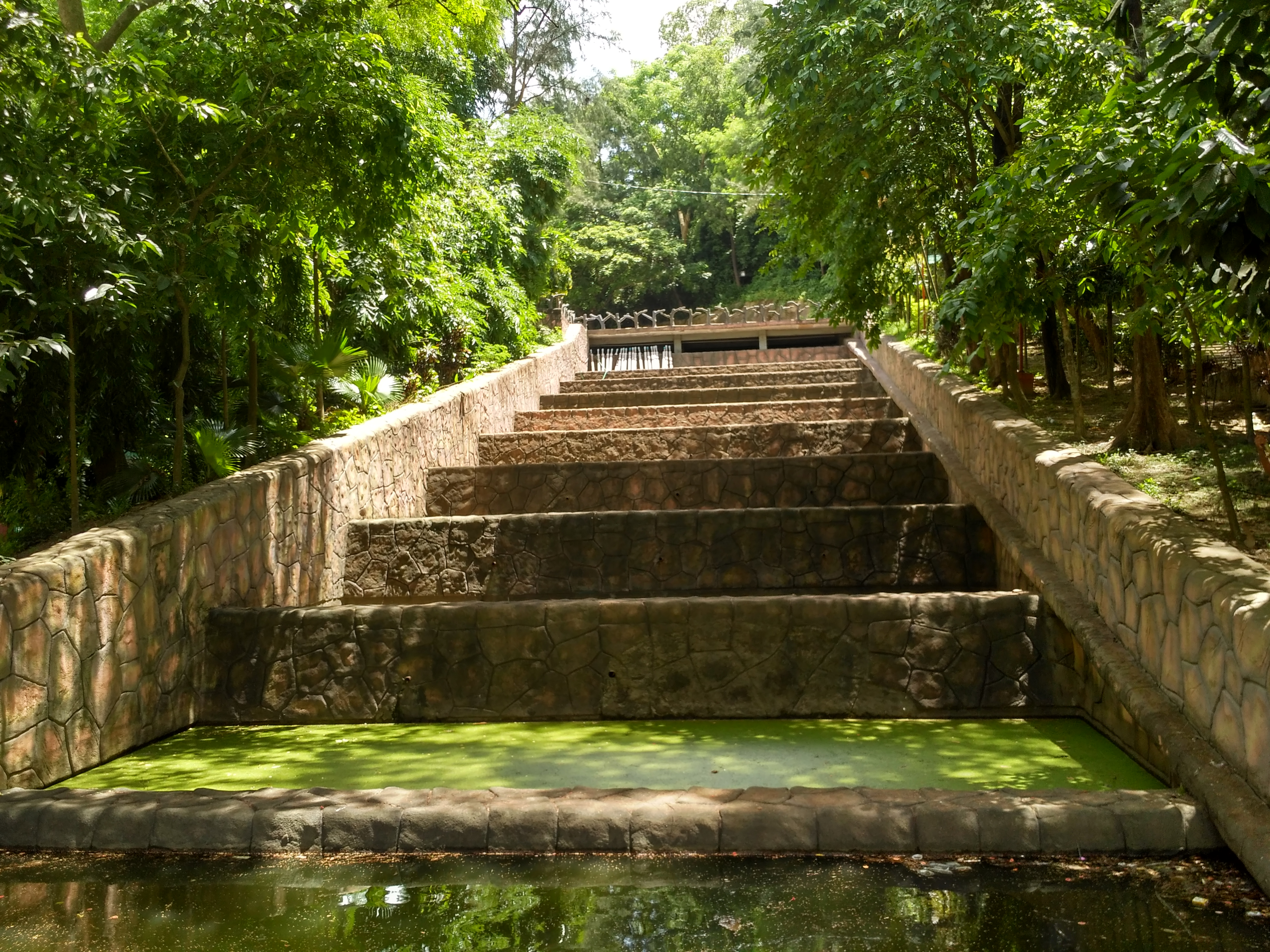

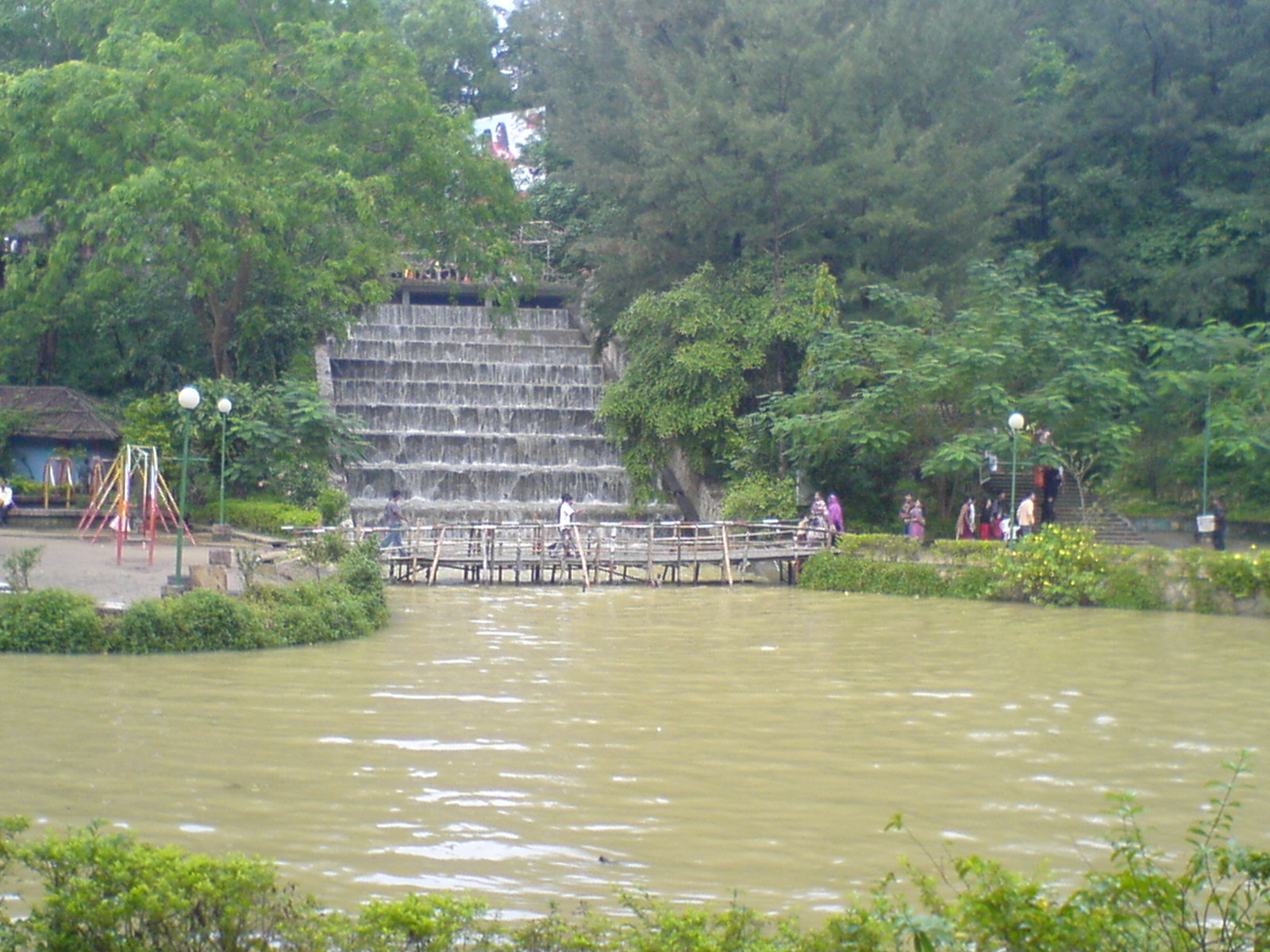

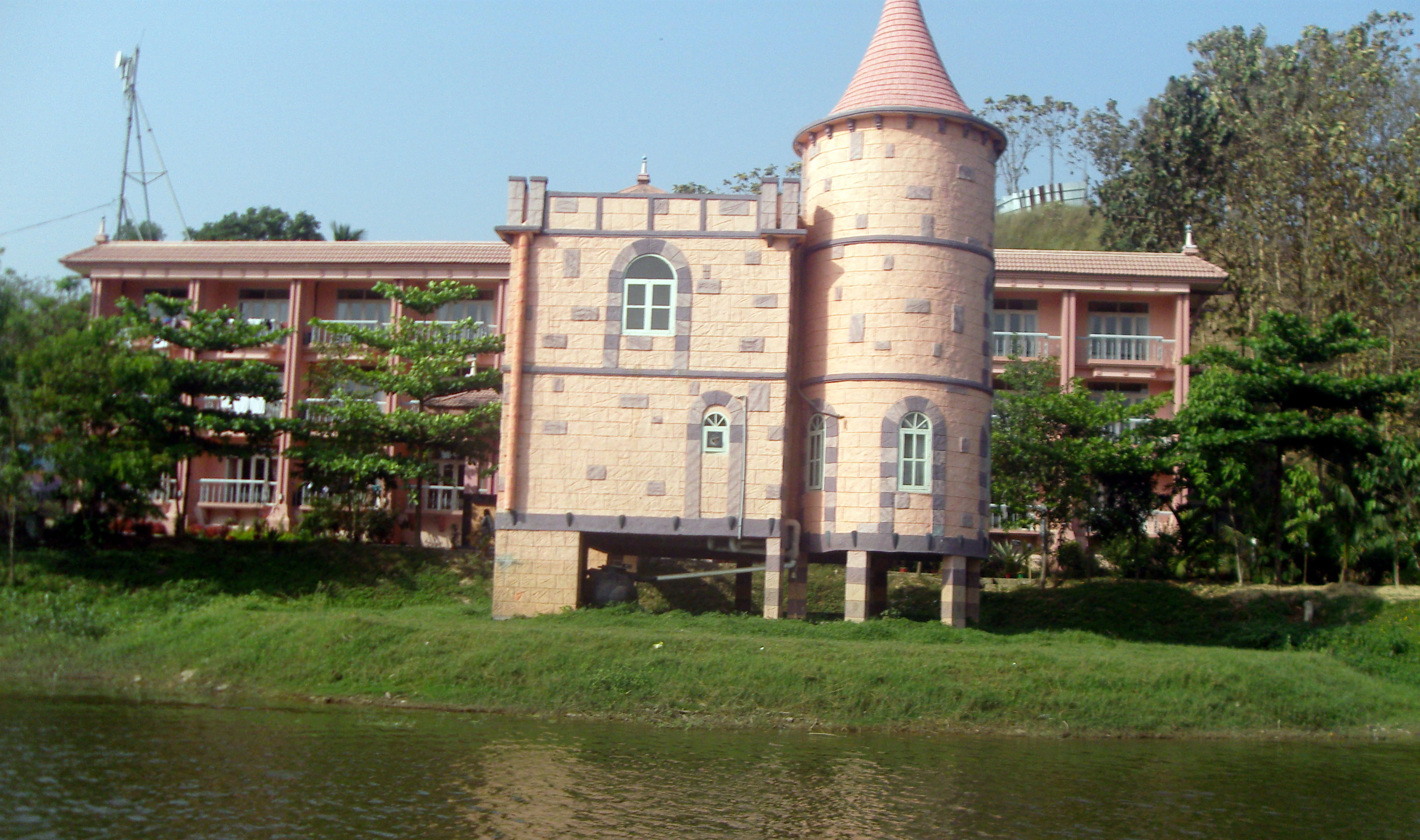

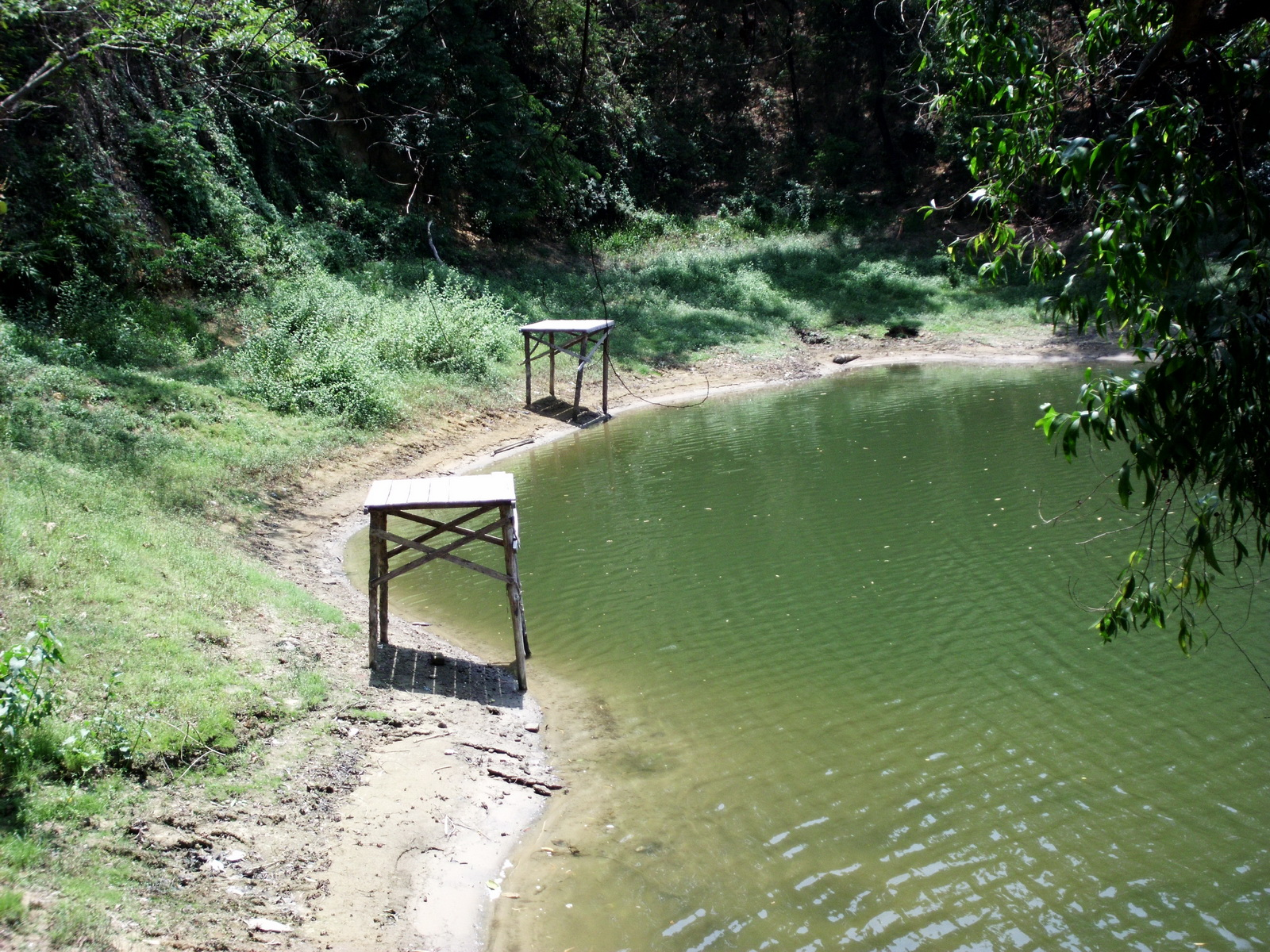

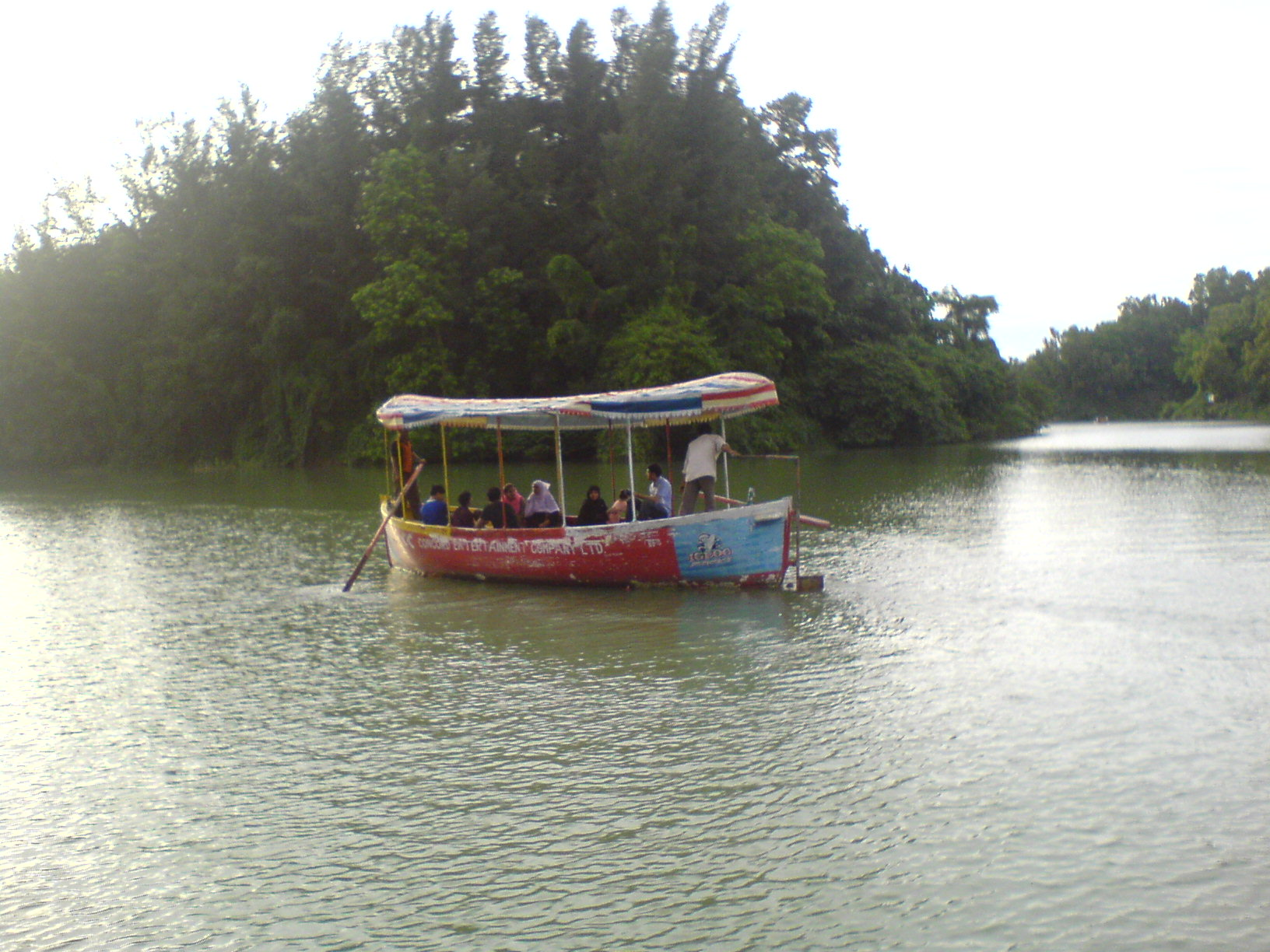

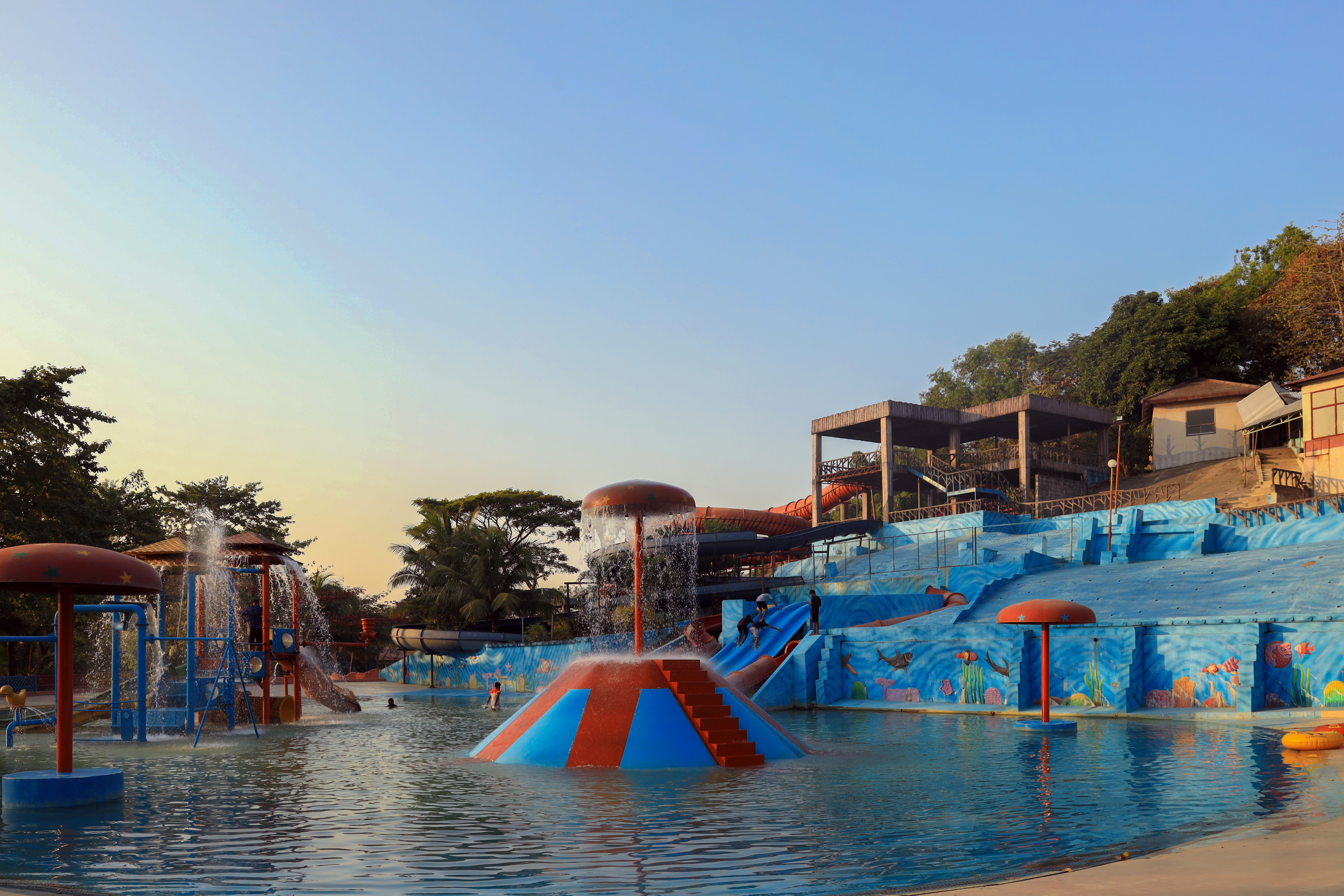

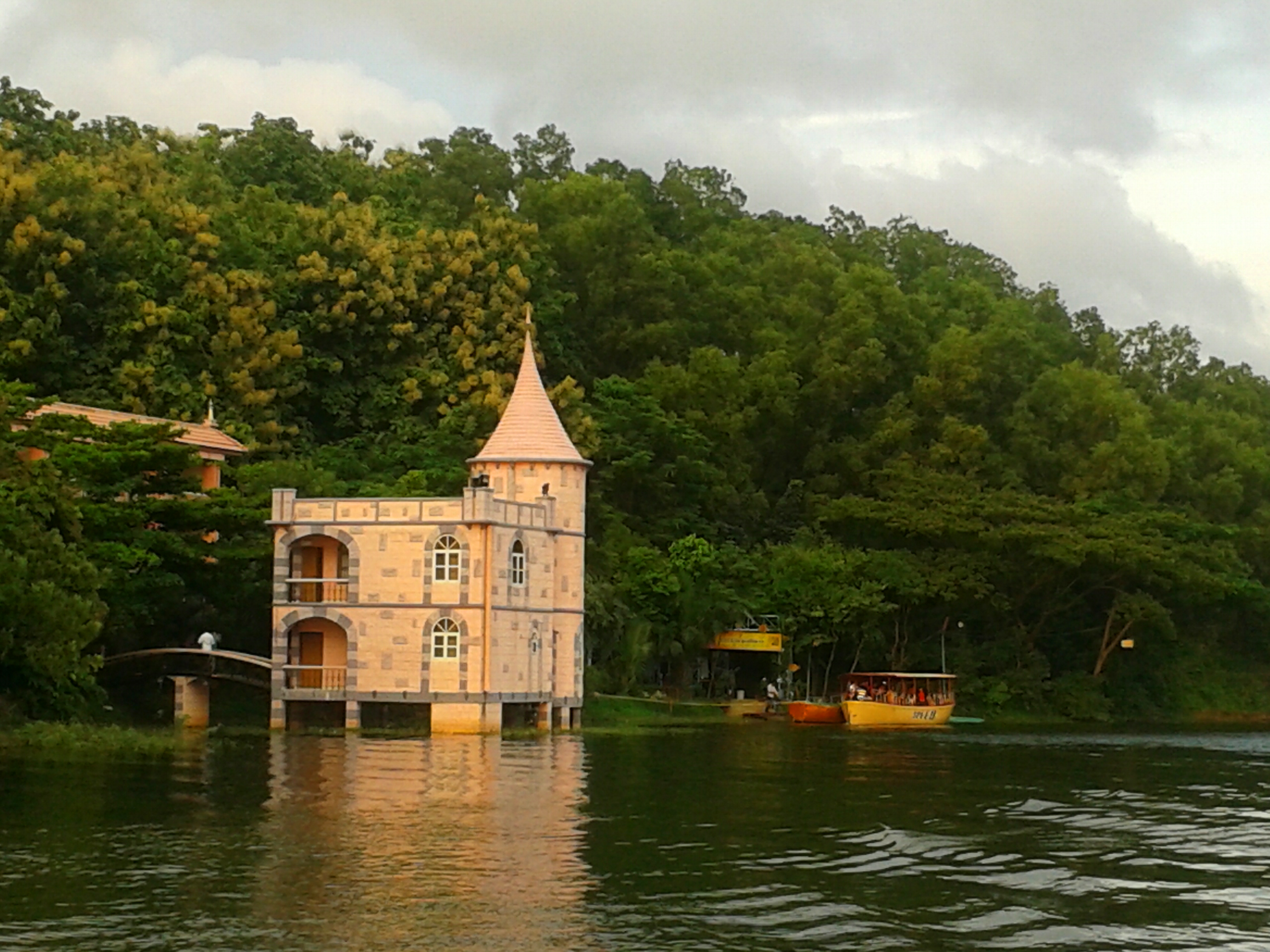

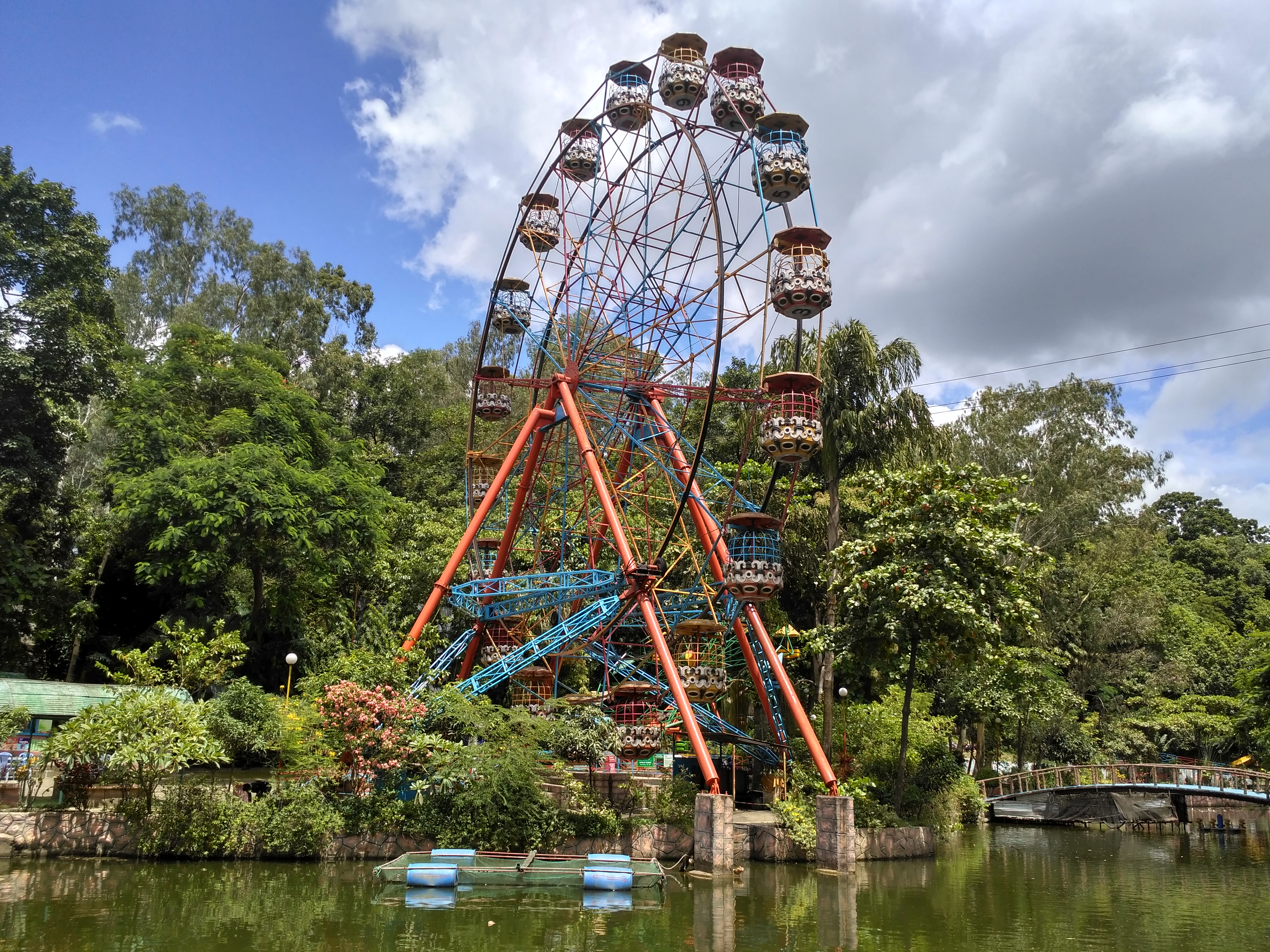

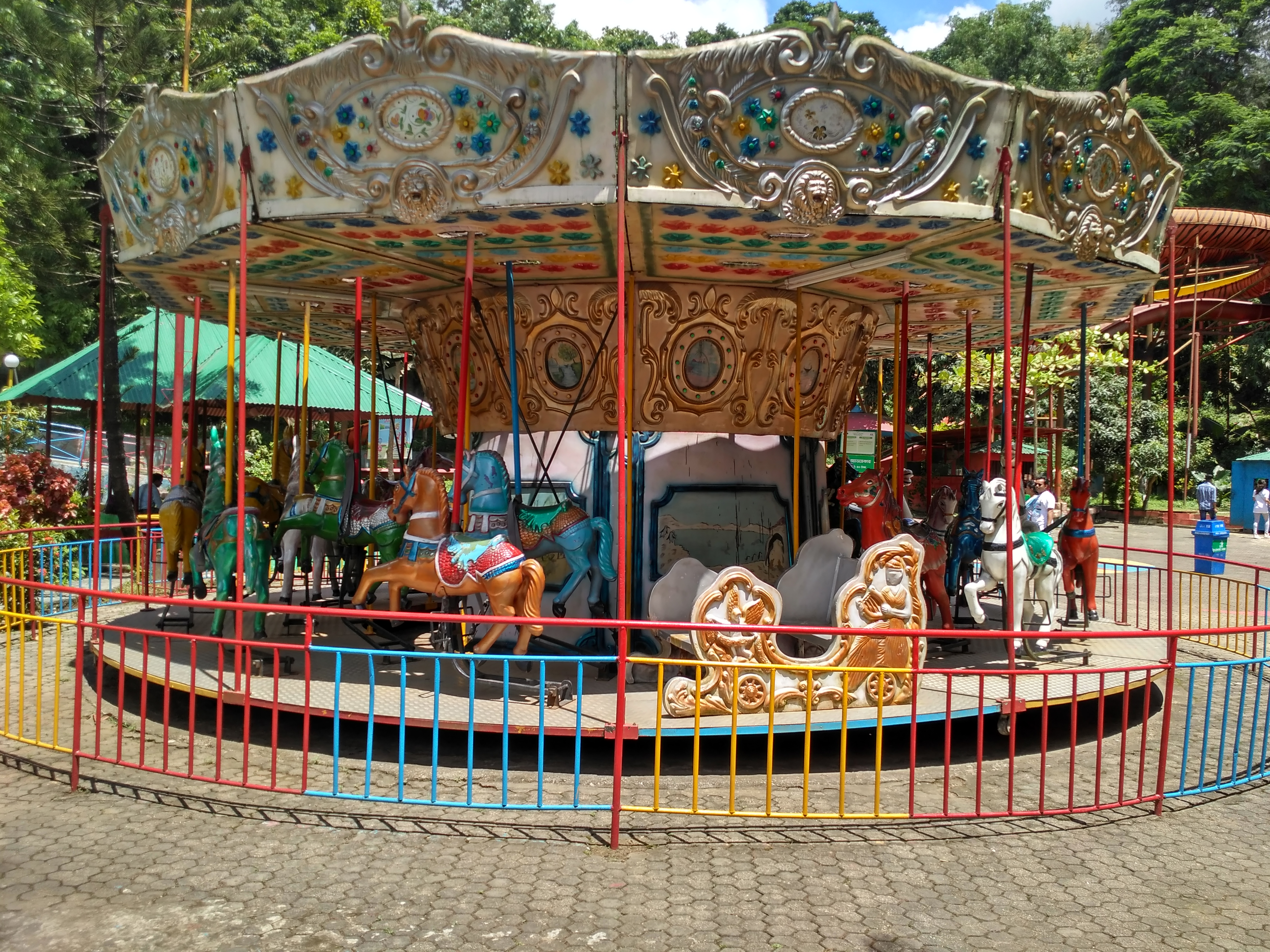

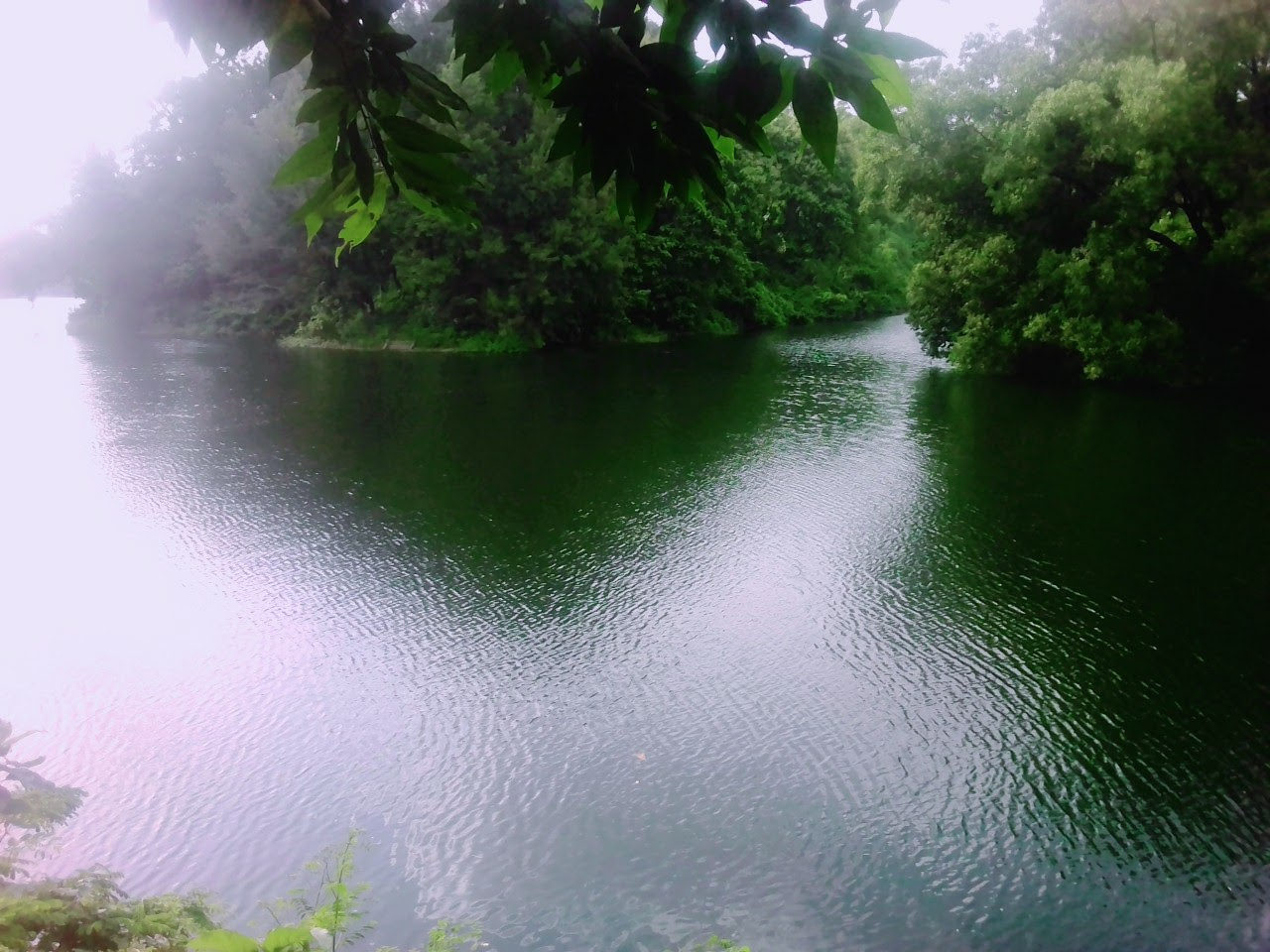
