= Comcentre =

Office skyscraper in Singapore

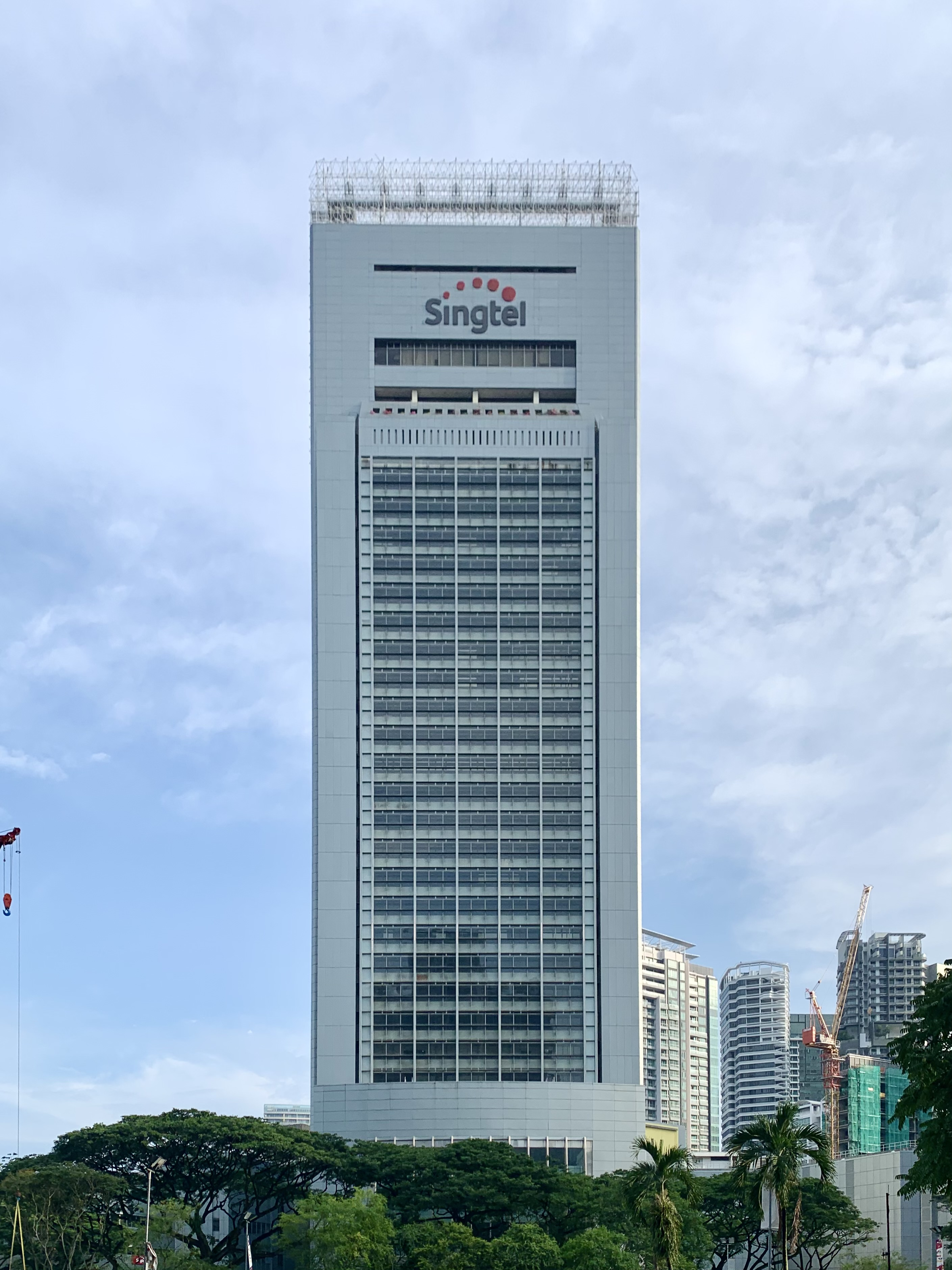
- Interactive map of the Comcentre area
- Alternative names: Communications Centre

General information
- Status: Demolished
- Type: Commercial offices
- Location: 31 Exeter Road, Orchard, Singapore 239732
- Coordinates: 1°17′56.96″N 103°50′17.99″E
- Construction started: 1979
- Completed: 1981
- Owner: Singtel

Height
- Antenna spire: 145 m (476 ft)
- Roof: 140 m (460 ft)

Technical details
- Floor count: 32

Design and construction
- Architect: BEP Akitekt

Comcentre was a 32-storey, 140 m (460 ft) skyscraper in the Central Region of Singapore. It was completed in 1981, and is tied with One Raffles Quay South Tower and Pan Pacific Singapore as the 82nd-tallest building in the city-state.

The building was the corporate headquarters of Singtel. A complex of antennae and satellite dishes were added after construction.

== History ==
On 23 February 2022, Singtel announced an over S$2 billion plan to redevelop Comcentre from 2024 into a 110,000 sq m building equipped with the latest digital technologies and sustainable features, as well as being well integrated into the surroundings with an underground connection to Somerset MRT station. The new Comcentre will be developed in a joint venture with another developer that will be selected in May, although two were shortlisted earlier. Singtel will divest its stake to the joint venture company with a majority stake, although it will take up 30 per cent of the space as the anchor tenant. The new Comcentre will also be equipped with hybrid working spaces for other tenants. It will be completed by 2028, with Singtel working in other offices in the meantime.

Following deliberations, on 1 June the same year, Singtel chose Lendlease as the developer of the new complex, taking part in a 51-49 joint venture company. The development will be designed by well known architects including Kohn Pedersen Fox, and cost S$3 billion. The building's design was also unveiled the same day, comprising two 20-storey buildings with a wide atrium and several dining and retail options, including Singtel's new flagship store. Also included are an elevated rooftop park with a 300-person auditorium, running and walking tracks and an integrated wellness hub.

== See also ==
- List of tallest buildings in Singapore
