= Shanta Holdings Limited =

Company at Bangladesh

- Company type: Privately held company
- Industry: Real estate
- Founded: 2005
- Founder: Khondoker Monir Uddin
- Headquarters: Shanta Western Tower, 186 Bir Uttam Mir Shawkat Sarak, Level 10, Tejgaon, Dhaka 1208
- Website: shantaholdings.com

Shanta Holdings Limited (SHL) is a diversified conglomerate based in Dhaka, Bangladesh. Khondoker Monir Uddin is the managing director of the group.

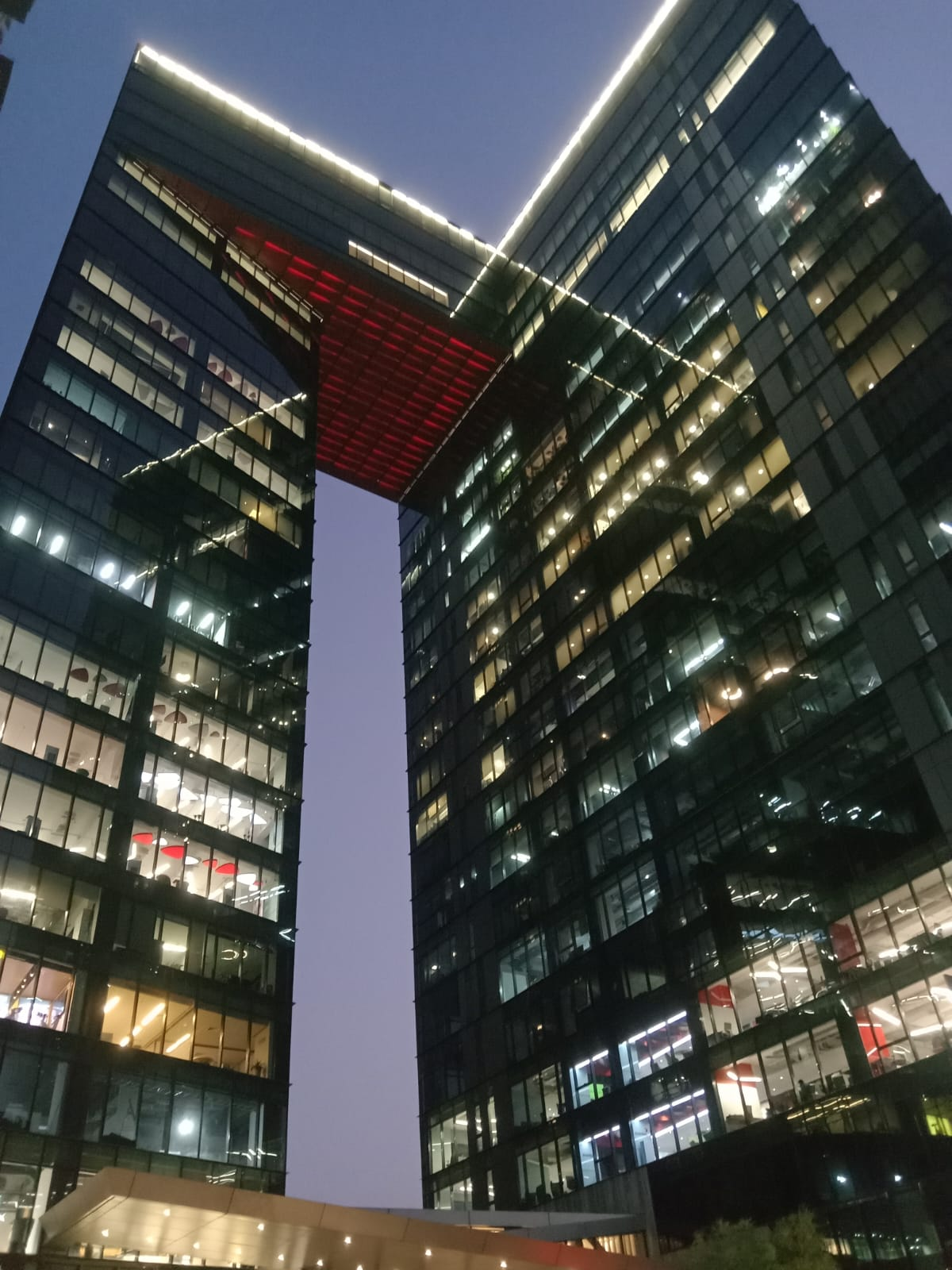
Shanta Forum, Tejgaon

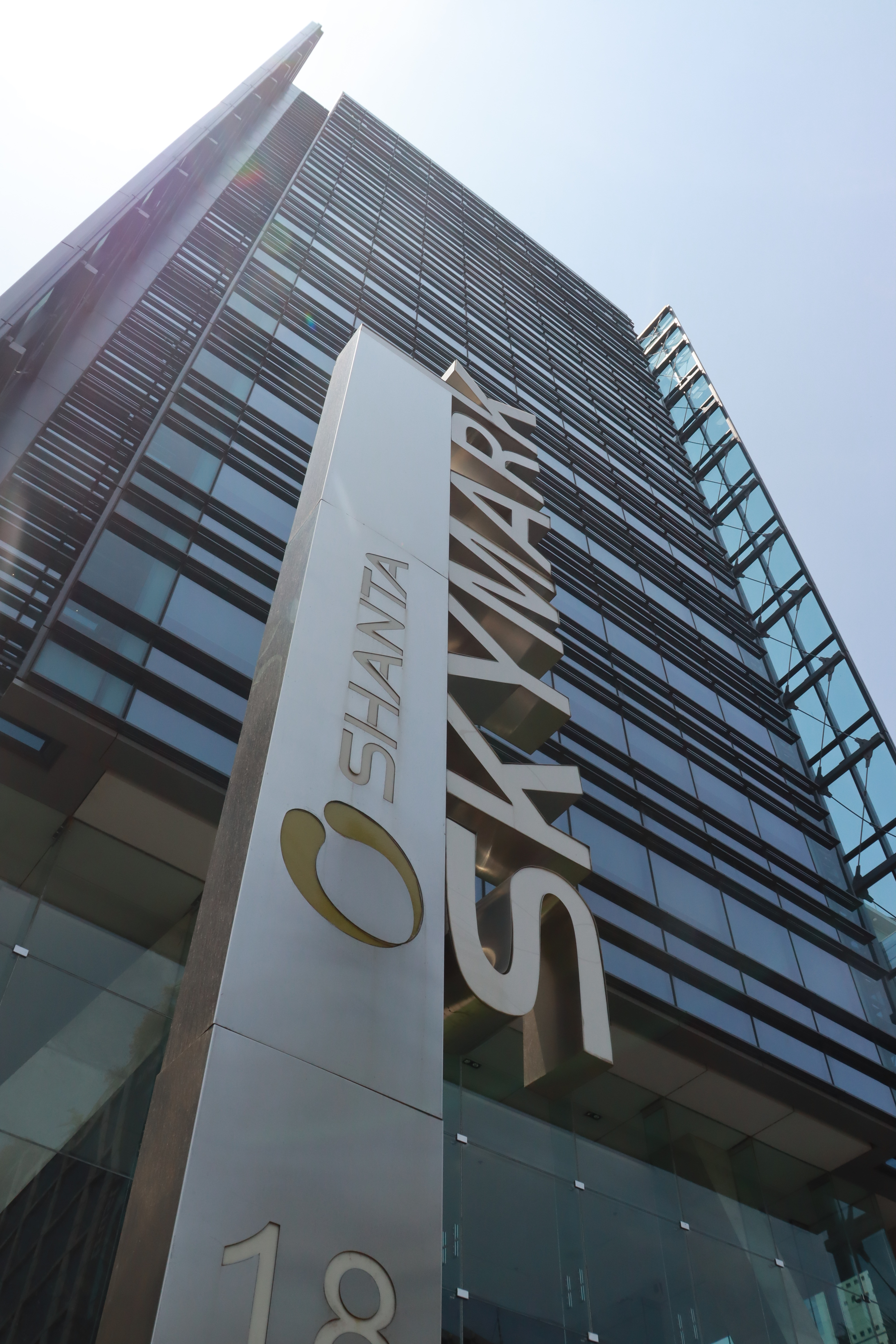
Shanta Skymark, Gulshan

== History ==
In 1988, Shanta entered the ready-made garment (RMG) sector, becoming one of the pioneers in exporting RMGs with companies such as Shanta Garments Ltd, Shanta Industries Ltd, Shanta Wash Works Ltd, GDS Chemicals Ltd, and Shanta Denims Ltd. In 2010, the group decided to focus on real estate development instead of the RMG sector and the group consequently sold their stake to Dewhirst Group Limited.

In 1997, Shanta Group merged some of their assets with Tropica Group and Sepal Group to form STS Group. STS Group is the owner of Evercare Hospital Dhaka, International School Dhaka, and Glenrich International School, Dhaka.

Some of the company's notable projects include the Safura Tower, Shanta Western Tower at Tejgaon, International School Dhaka (ISD) at Bashundhara, and Glenrich International School at Dhaka. Shanta Holding was also involved in the construction of Evercare Hospital Dhaka. Shanta's notable projects are Shanta Western Tower, Shanta Digonto, Shanta Pinnacle, Dhaka Tower - the very first project of Office for Metropolitan Architecture in Bangladesh and Shanta Forum Twin Towers. It constructed the building of Amari Hotel Dhaka.

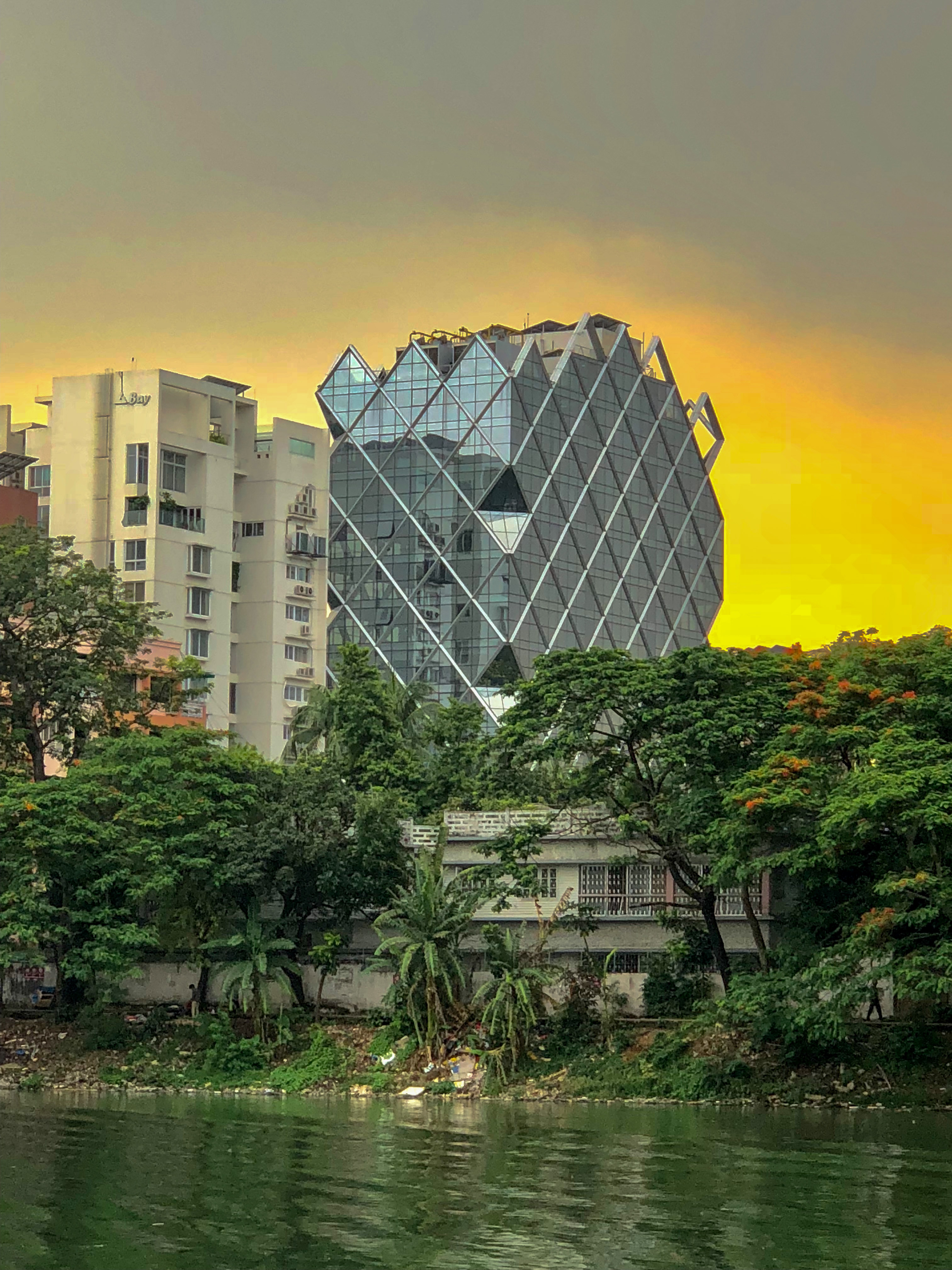
The Glass House, Architect- Ehsan Khan

== Subsidiaries ==
- Shanta Lifestyle
- Shanta Securities Limited
- Shanta Asset Management Limited
- Shanta Life Insurance PLC
- Shanta Multiverse
- The White Canary Café
- Shanta Equity Limited
- Shanta Property Management

== Board of directors ==
Name	Position	Reference
Khondoker Monir Uddin	Managing Director	
Jasmine Sultana	Director	
Saif Khondoker	Director	
Mayesha Khondoker	Director	
