= Mutares =

German holding company

Mutares SE & Co. KGaA
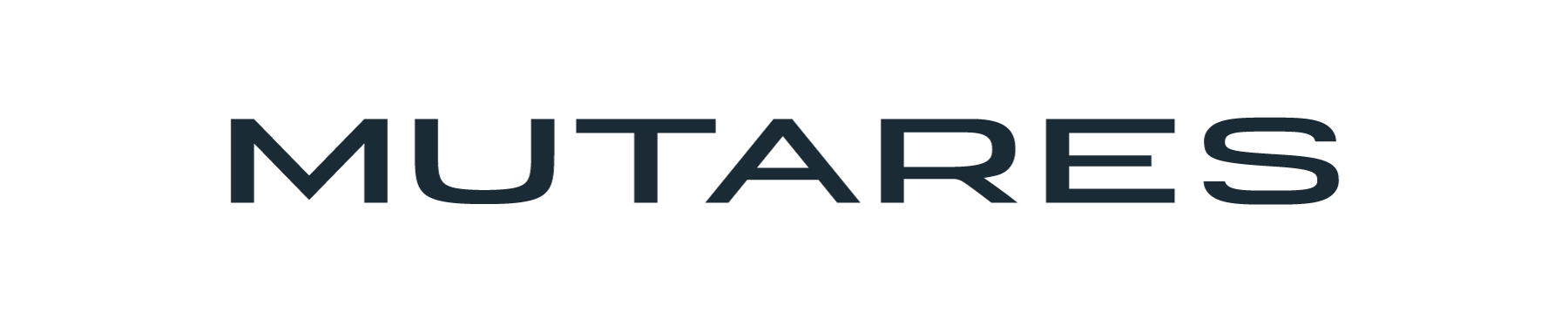
- Company type: Aktiengesellschaft
- Traded as: FWB: MUX; SDAX
- ISIN: DE000A2NB650
- Founded: 2008
- Headquarters: Munich, Germany
- Key people: Robin Laik, CEO; Mark Friedrich, CFO; Dr. Lennart Schley, COO; Johannes Laumann, CIO; Volker Rofalski chairman
- Revenue: €4.72 billion (2023)
- Number of employees: 27,000 (2023)
- Website: www.mutares.com

Mutares SE & Co. KGaA (styled MUTARES) is an international private equity investor focused on special situations, particularly acquiring parts of large corporations (carve-outs) and companies in transitional phases.

== Portfolio ==
Since its establishment in 2008, Mutares has acquired more than 50 companies and carried out several divestments. The company's portfolio companies operate in a wide range of industries globally. Mutares' portfolio is divided into four segments: Automotive & Mobility, Engineering & Technology, Goods & Services, and Retail & Food.

== Bankruptcies and Liquidations ==
Various Mutares Portfolio Companies had to file for bankruptcy or have been liquidated:

- German paper mill Zanders,
- French e-commerce company Pixmania
- German producer of inverters Platinum
- French Wholesaler for tableware Artmadis was liquidated.

== Company sales ==
The following portfolio companies had been sold off:

- German automotive supplier STS Group,
- Italien postal company Nexive,Klann Packaging,
- German Fertigungstechnik Weißenfels
- Dutch producer of waste machines Geesinknorba
- German producer of packaging machines A+F Automation+Fördertechnik,
- French e-commerce trader of electronic goods Grosbill
- French e-commerce company Pixmania,
- Irish pharma company Suir Pharma Ireland (ex Stada Production Ireland),
- French logistics company SN CGVL
- German automotive supplier HIB Trim Parts Solutions

== Development of the Mutares Group ==
Mutares was founded in 2008 by Axel Geuer and Robin Laik in Munich. In 2013, the Mutares Group achieved nine-year sales of €347 million with nine investments. In fiscal 2012, the financial year was changed to the calendar year. Until the short financial year 2012, the financial year ran from April to March. In addition to its headquarters in Munich, Mutares also has offices in London (UK), Paris (France) and Milan (Italy).

Development of the Mutares Group
	2008	2009	2010	2011	2012*	2013	2014	2015	2016	2017	2018	2019	2020	2021	2022	2023	2024
Revenue(million €)	6	61	128	159	301	347	648	684	648	900	856	1,020	1,590	2,520	3,770	4,690	5,210
Portfolio Companies	2	7	5	11	11	9	11	12	11	11	10	13	n/a	n/a	n/a	n/a	31

* Short fiscal year from April until December. / 2019 - 2024 revenue

== Portfolio Companies ==
=== Elastomer Solutions (2009) ===
The Elastomer Solutions Group designs, manufactures and distributes moulded rubber parts for the automotive industry.

The group's main product is grommets for protecting wiring looms in automotive on-board electrical systems, such as between vehicle doors and the body. Elastomer supplies these products to customers such as Ford, Opel, Renault and Volvo.

Elastomer employs approximately 470 people at a total of six locations in Germany, Portugal, Slovakia, Morocco and Mexico.

The Elastomer Solutions Group was acquired from the Diehl Group in August 2009.

=== Klann Packaging (2011) ===
Klann is a manufacturer of tinplate packaging.

Klann develops and produces promotional and sales packaging from printed tinplate. Among its customers are well-known manufacturers of branded products and retailers from a range of sectors.

Klann operates from its headquarters in Landshut, where it employs roughly 100 people.

Mutares acquired the Decorative business of the HUBER Packaging Group in June 2011 and renamed it KLANN Packaging.

=== Eupec (2012) ===
Eupec is a provider of coatings for oil and gas pipelines.

Eupec has three facilities in the Dunkirk region of France, home to roughly 70 employees.

Eupec was acquired from Indonesia's Korindo Group in January 2012.

=== STS Acoustics (2013) ===
The STS Group designs and manufactures acoustic and thermal insulation in the engine and passenger compartments of vehicles, as well as interior and exterior trim parts for light and heavy-duty trucks and lorries.

STS is one of the suppliers to customers such as MAN, Scania and Volvo for trucks and passenger car manufacturers such as Alfa Romeo, Ferrari, Fiat, Jeep and Maserati.

Following the successful completion of various add-on acquisitions the STS Group now operates at a total of 16 plants on four continents and currently employs around 2,450 people in total.

Mutares acquired the company from the Autoneum Group in July 2013.

=== Norsilk (2015) ===
Norsilk is a French manufacturer and dealer of wooden panelling and flooring.

Norsilk designs a range of wooden products for gardens and building panelling. Norsilk has a diversified customer structure in the DIY outlet, wholesale and industrial segments.

Norsilk has a total of approximately 110 employees working at its facility in Boulleville.

Mutares acquired the Finnish Metsä Group's wood business in France in October 2015.

=== Balcke-Dürr (2016) ===
Balcke-Dürr is a manufacturer of power station components and filter systems.

Balcke-Dürr produces components for improving energy efficiency and reducing emissions in the energy industry.

In addition to its corporate headquarters in Düsseldorf, the company operates development centres and production facilities in Germany, Italy, Poland, China and India and employs a total of around 620 people.

Mutares acquired international equipment manufacturer Balcke-Dürr from SPX Corporation in December 2016.

=== Cenpa (2016) ===
Cenpa is a manufacturer of cardboard made from waste paper.

Cenpa is an independent producer of cardboard, and its products are used primarily for tubes, particularly in the hygiene, industrial and packaging sectors.

Cenpa has been based in Schweighouse in Alsace, France, since 1893, and employs around 85 people there.

Mutares acquired Sonoco Paper France from the US-based Sonoco Products Company in May 2016 before returning the historic name of Cenpa to it shortly thereafter.

=== La Meusienne (2017) ===
La Meusienne is a manufacturer of corrosion-resistant stainless steel tubes.

The company has a factory in Ancerville and a distribution centre in Annecy, France, where it has around 170 employees.

Mutares acquired the steel pipe business of the international Aperam Group in April 2017 and returned the traditional name of La Meusienne to the company.

=== Donges Group (2017) ===
Donges Group is a leading full-service provider for bridge and steel constructions as well as roof and facade systems.

Donges Group comprises Donges SteelTec GmbH, one of Germany's steel construction and bridge construction companies and Kalzip Group, a manufacturer of Aluminium roof and facade systems, as well as Normek Oy, one of the companies for structural steelwork and facade in northern Europe and FDT FlachdachTechnologie, a German manufacturer for flat roof systems. The group has locations in Germany, France, Spain, Italy, UK, Finland, Sweden, Singapore, India and Dubai.

The combined product portfolio of Donges, Kalzip, Normek and FDT comprises steel bridges for road, rail and footway construction, engineering and industrial steel construction for buildings, aluminium roof and facades for new projects or refurbishments, as well as structural steelwork, facades made of glass and flat roof systems.

Recent reference projects include the Danube Bridge in Linz, the launch table for the Ariane 6 rocket for ESA, the roof refurbishment of Wembley Stadium in London and the partial construction of the logistics and ferry terminal in Lübeck.

Mutares acquired the bridge and building construction specialist Donges SteelTec from Japanese Mitsubishi Hitachi Power Systems in October 2017. Kalzip Group was acquired by Donges Group as a strategic add-on in October 2018 from Tata Steel Europe. The add-on Acquisition of Normek Oy was finalized in February 2019 and was bought from Intera Fund I Ky and private shareholders. In March 2019 the FDT was acquired as third strategic add-on for the group from a private holder.

=== Gemini Rail Group ===
Gemini Rail Services UK and Gemini Rail Technology UK form the Gemini Rail Group, a provider of a wide range of component and vehicle overhaul services to rolling stock owners and train operating companies across the UK and Ireland.

The group is specialized in vehicle overhaul, refurbishment, modernization, upgrading, incident repairs and wheelset overhaul as well as a globally active integrator of electrical traction systems to leading rail vehicle owners. Furthermore, it offers engineering consulting like turnkey solutions for refurbishment and modernization for domestic and international rolling stock providers, as well as project management and system integration.

In the UK, Gemini Rail Group operates from Birmingham, Wolverhampton and Glasgow with approximately 700 employees.

=== Glasgow Works (2018) ===
Mutares acquired the group in November 2018 from brake specialist Knorr-Bremse.

=== EFACEC (2023) ===
Mutares acquired the Portuguese state-owned company EFACEC in 2023.

=== Arriva ===
In May 2023 Arriva's Danish and Serbian bus and rail operations were purchased as well as its bus operations in Poland.

=== VR ===
In 2024, VR's road freight business was purchased.

=== SMA Metalltechnik (2025) ===
Mutares acquired assets of S.M.A. Metalltechnik GmbH & Co. KG and its subsidiaries in January 2025

=== Asteri Facility Solutions (2025) ===
Sale of Asteri Facility Solutions to SOL Facility Services in January 2025.
