= Maulvibazar Polytechnic Institute =

Government Polytechnic Institute of Bangladesh

Moulvibazar Government Polytechnic Institute
- Type: Polytechnic Institute Engineering Institute
- Established: 2010
- Principal: Engineer Md. Alauddin
- Students: 3,200 students
- Location: Moulvibazar, Bangladesh; 24.482174°N 91.813960°E
- Campus: Urban; 2 acres (0.81 ha)
- Affiliations: Bangladesh Technical Education Board
- Website: mpi.moulvibazar.gov.bd

Moulvibazar Government Polytechnic Institute is a modern standard polytechnic institute in Bangladesh. The institute offers a four-year Diploma in Engineering program in four different departments.

== History ==
Moulvibazar Government Polytechnic Institute is located on four acres of land in Matarcapon, Moulvibazar district. To expand engineering education, former Minister of Finance and Planning of the Government of the People’s Republic of Bangladesh, M. Saifur Rahman, laid the foundation stone of the institute on 6 Falgun 1412 (18 February 2006).

On 13 October 2010, the official administrative activities of the institution began by appointing one teacher as acting principal through transfer. Later, one teacher each was appointed to the Computer and Electronics departments in the same process. Academic activities started on 23 October 2010, in the 2010–2011 academic year, with the enrollment of 186 students in Computer and Electronics Technology in the 1st and 2nd shifts (91+95). Later, two more technologies were introduced.

In RAC Technology, a total of 96 students (48+48) were admitted in the 1st and 2nd shifts. Hostel facilities: There is only one four-story hostel building with a capacity of 96 students. Hostel activities started in July 2012 with 96 seats allocated.

== Location ==
Moulvibazar Government Polytechnic Institute is located about 4 km east of Chowmuhani, the heart of Moulvibazar town. Nearby are Moulvibazar Imperial Medical College and various educational institutions.

== Departments ==
Currently, the institute has four departments:

1. Computer Science and Engineering
2. Electrical and Electronic Engineering (Electronics Technology)
3. Refrigeration and Air Conditioning Engineering (RAC)
4. Food Engineering (Food Technology)

== Campus ==
The main campus has three five-storied buildings: two academic buildings and one administrative building. There are also workshop rooms, offices, a library, laboratories, a 500-seat auditorium, a hardware lab, a software lab, and a multimedia networking lab. In addition, a Shaheed Minar is located near the main gate of the institute.
