= Nursing care levels =

Nursing care levels are different levels of care by which nursing services are provided for a patient. In the UK, they include "Bay Nursing", "Arm's Length Nursing" and "1:1 Nursing". The latter is also called "Specialling Nursing". They represent controlling the care from one station to an area -where includes a number of patients- by a nurse, 2 or 3 patients available to a nurse, or only one patient by a nurse respectively.
