= Shazeeb M Khairul Islam =

- সজীব এম খায়রুল ইসলাম

Private Secretary to the Chief Adviser
- In office September 2024 – February 2026
- Chief Adviser: Muhammad Yunus

Personal details
- Born: 14 December 1990 (age 35) Dhaka, Bangladesh
- Education: University of Dhaka, Columbia University
- Profession: Entrepreneur, Civil Servant

Shazeeb M Khairul Islam, is a Bangladeshi social entrepreneur, venture investor and former civil servant. Most recently he served as the private secretary to the Chief Adviser of the Interim Government of Bangladesh led by Muhammad Yunus. He founded YY Ventures in 2016 to build, accelerate, and invest in social businesses that are moving towards a world of three zeros - zero poverty, zero unemployment, and zero net carbon emissions in emerging countries. He has also served as the Country Advisor for Bangladesh at Give2Asia, a non-profit supporting cross-border philanthropy and locally led development. He is an Obama Foundation Columbia University Scholar.

== Early life ==
Islam was born on 14 December 1990 in Chandpur. He completed his BBA and MBA at the University of Dhaka in 2012 and 2014 respectively. He is a protege of Professor Muhammad Yunus.

== Career ==
Islam was the CEO of ygap from January 2016 to April 2017. He spoke at a TedX event organized by the International School Dhaka. He was the country advisor of Give2Asia from January 2018 to June 2020. He was an advisor of the Food and Agriculture Organization July 2021 to June 2022. He founded and served as the managing director of YY Ventures since March 2019. His company has till date supported 108 social entrepreneurs who are fighting poverty, unemployment and carbon emissions and has created 2000+ jobs in Bangladesh. From August 2020 to June 2021, he attended Columbia University as an Obama scholar.

Islam also co-founded Impact Hub Dhaka that offers inspiring workspaces, community-led events, diverse network, entrepreneurship programs and consulting services to help young Bangladeshis bring sustainable solutions that positively benefits the people of Bangladesh. Previously he has also served as a member of the board of trustees of Grameen Trust from February 2022 till August 2024. He taught at the United International University and the Independent University Bangladesh and has guest lectured at Columbia University in the City of New York, Kiyushu University and New York University.

In June 2024, Islam attended the 14th Social Business Day in Manila, Philippines with Muhammad Yunus. Following the fall of the Sheikh Hasina led Interim government, he was appointed private secretary of the Chief Adviser of the interim government of Bangladesh, a position held by Muhammad Yunus.
