= Playpen (disambiguation) =

Playpen:

- Playpen, a piece of furniture for an infant or young toddler
- Playpen (school), an English-medium education school in Bangladesh
- Playpen (website), a darknet child pornography site

It can also refer to:

- Exercise pen, sometimes called a playpen for pets
