= Evercare Hospital Dhaka =

Hospital in Dhaka, Bangladesh

Coordinates: 23.8106°N 90.4308°E

Evercare Hospital Dhaka এভারকেয়ার হাসপাতাল ঢাকা
- Evercare Group, STS Group
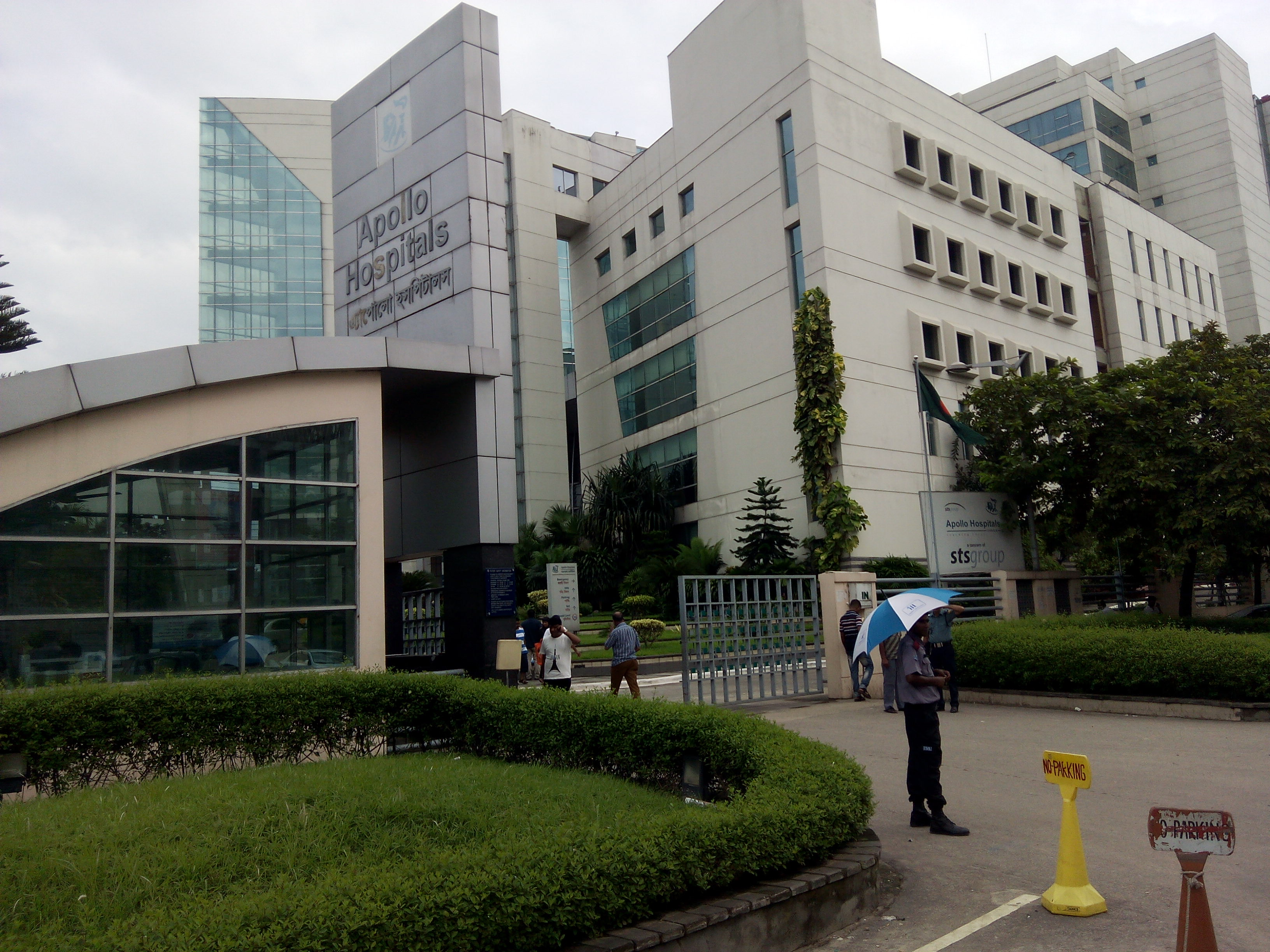
- Evercare Hospitals in 2014 when it was part of Apollo Hospitals, Dhaka

Geography
- Location: Bashundhara Residential Area, Dhaka, Bangladesh

History
- Former name: Apollo Hospitals Dhaka
- Opened: 2005

Links
- Website: Evercare Hospital Dhaka Website

Evercare Hospital Dhaka is a multidisciplinary super-specialty tertiary-care hospital in Dhaka, Bangladesh and part of Evercare Group. It was previously called Apollo Hospital Dhaka.

== History ==
The hospital is located in Bashundhara Residential Area. In September 2015, Apollo Hospital was fined 1.6 million for having contraband pharmaceuticals. In December 2015, Apollo Hospital started online appointment and payment services. In 2016, the hospital carried out programs including one in Jamuna Future Park to raise awareness on World Heart Day. On 12 March 2016, an autologous stem cell transplantation was carried out in the hospital, the first successful one in Bangladesh. STS Holdings, the holding company of the hospital, held roadshows, over plans to make the hospital go public, for institutional investors.

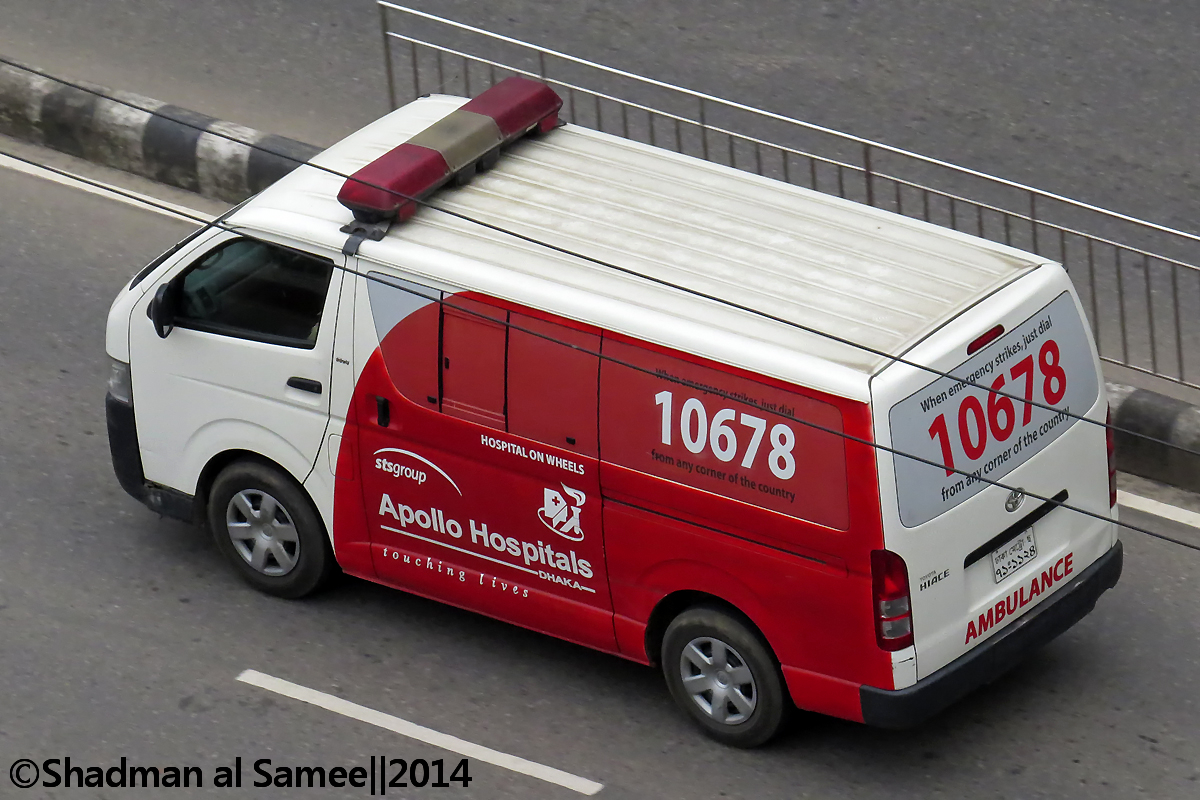
Ambulance of Apollo Hospitals Dhaka in 2016

In 2020, the hospital was renamed Evercare Hospital Dhaka after being sold to the Evercare Group. This hospital's noticeable advancement took place in the cancer treatment division. Till March 11, 2024, this hospital conducted 100 bone marrow transplants. Bangladesh Former Prime Minister Khaleda Zia was under treatment here for various times until her death in 2025.

Evercare's second hospital in Bangladesh, the 470-bed Evercare Hospital Chattogram, was opened in 2021. Both Evercare Hospital Dhaka and Evercare Hospital Chattogram became part of the India-based Aster DM Healthcare after the merger of Aster DM Healthcare and Blackstone-owned Quality Care India.

== See also ==
- Imperial Hospital Limited
