= Dhaka Tower =

Skyscraper in Dhaka, Bangladesh

- ঢাকা টাওয়ার
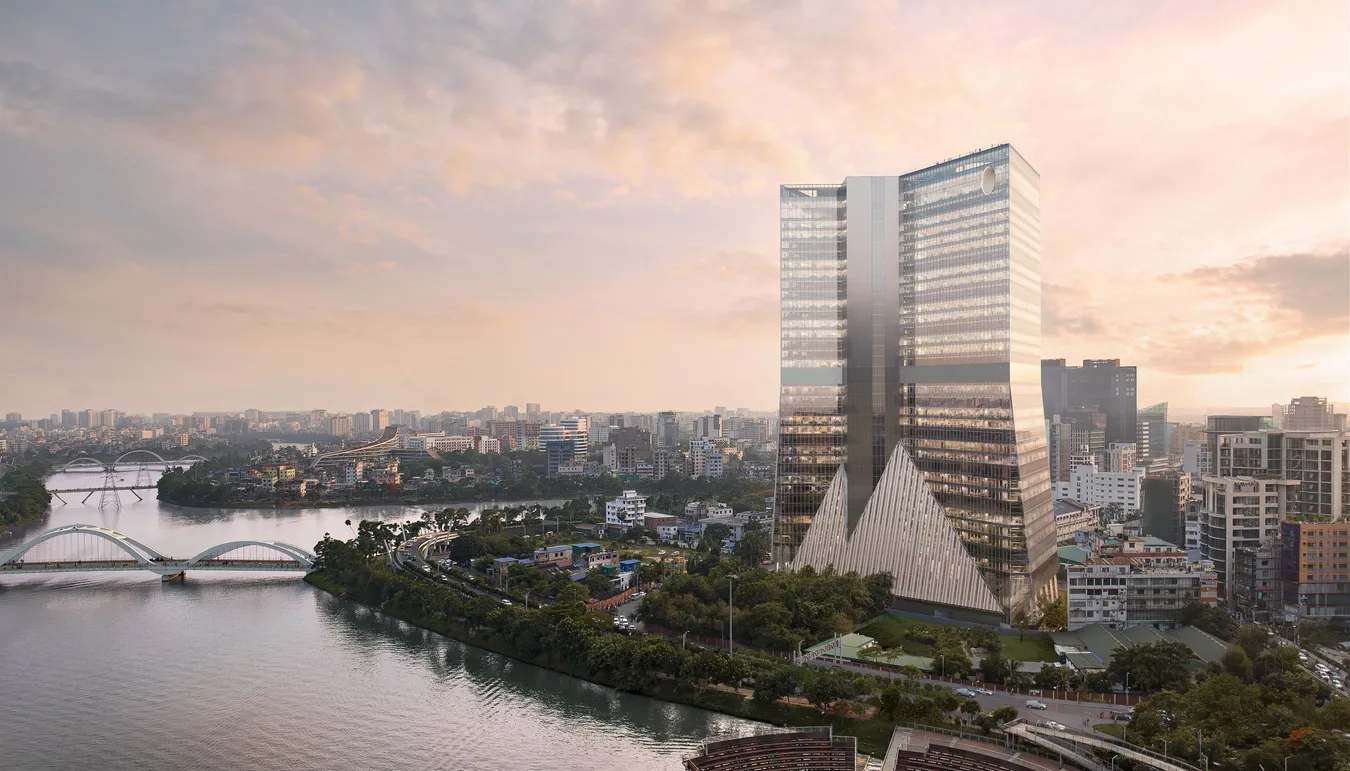
- Rendered design of Dhaka Tower

General information
- Status: Under construction
- Location: Hatirjheel, Tejgaon I/A,, 203-204, Tejgaon I/A, Dhaka, Dhaka, Bangladesh
- Construction started: 2023
- Owner: Shanta Holdings Limited

Height
- Height: 150 metres

Technical details
- Floor count: 38 + 6 (Basements)
- Floor area: 180,000m²

Design and construction
- Architect: Iyad Alsaka
- Architecture firm: OMA

Dhaka Tower is a 150 m (492 ft) tall, 38-storey skyscraper, currently being constructed at Dhaka’s Tejgaon Industrial Area, on the shores of Hatirjheel Lake. The building is a project of the Dhaka-based real estate firm, Shanta Holdings, while the Netherlands’ Office for Metropolitan Architecture has designed it. Once completed, the high rise will stand 150 metres, making it one of the tallest buildings in both the city and the country. It will feature 180,000 square metres of office space.

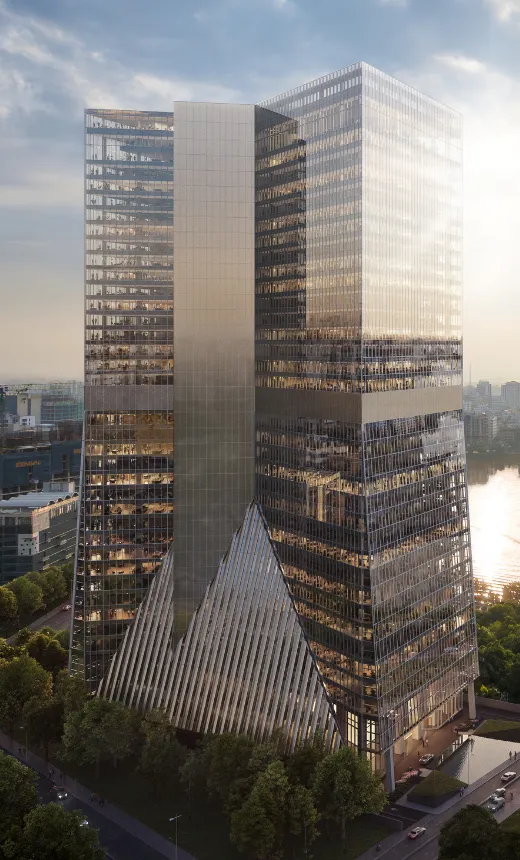

OMA partner Iyad Alsaka designed the skyscraper, with him claiming that Bangladesh's rapidly growing economy was the inspiration for the design.
