= Bashundhara Residential Area =

Coordinates: 23.821°N 90.444°E

Bashundhara Residential Area (Bashundhara R/A)
- Private neighbourhood
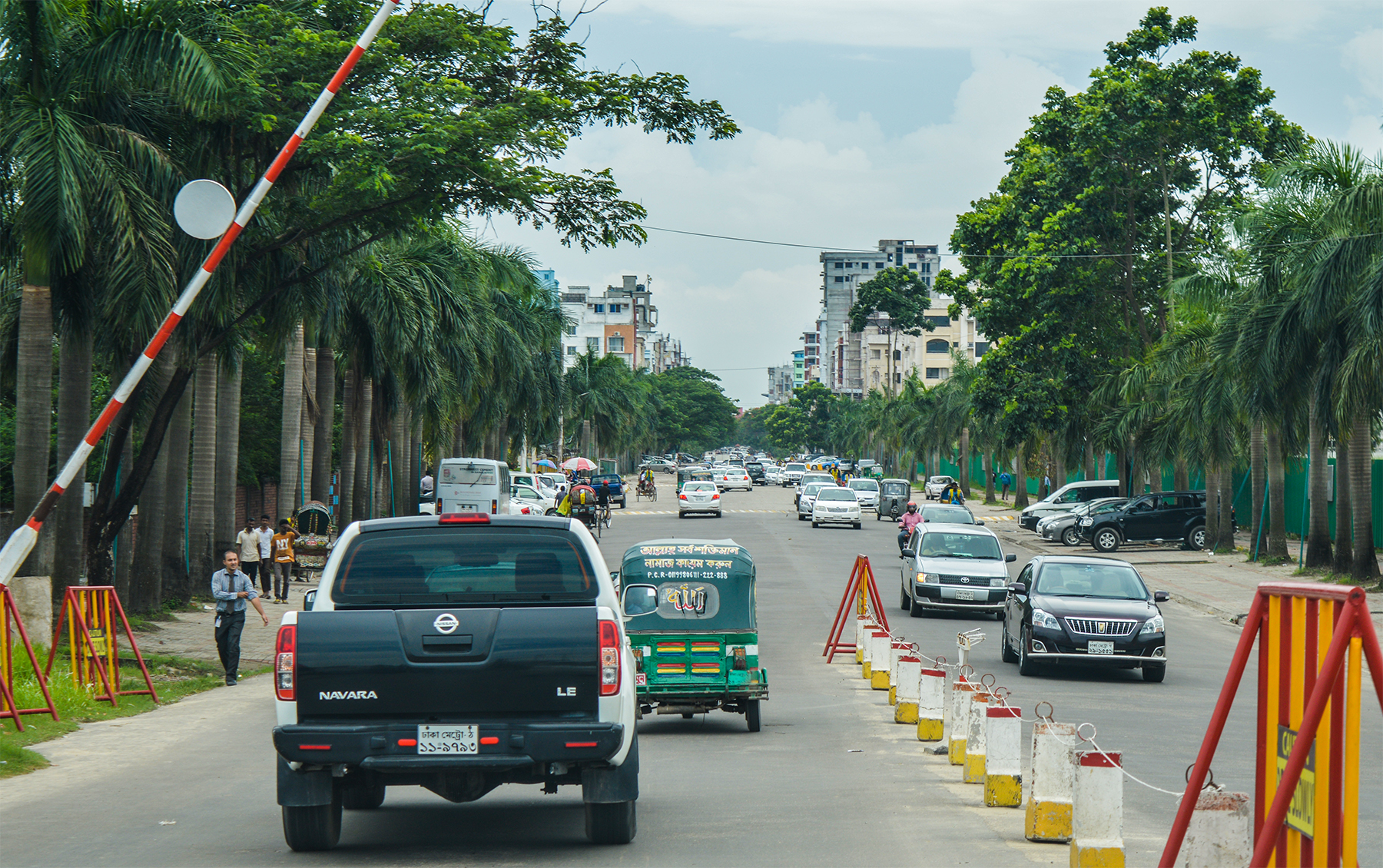
- Interactive map of Bashundhara Residential Area (Bashundhara R/A)
- Country: Bangladesh
- Time zone: UTC+6 (BST)
- Website: Bashundhara R/A

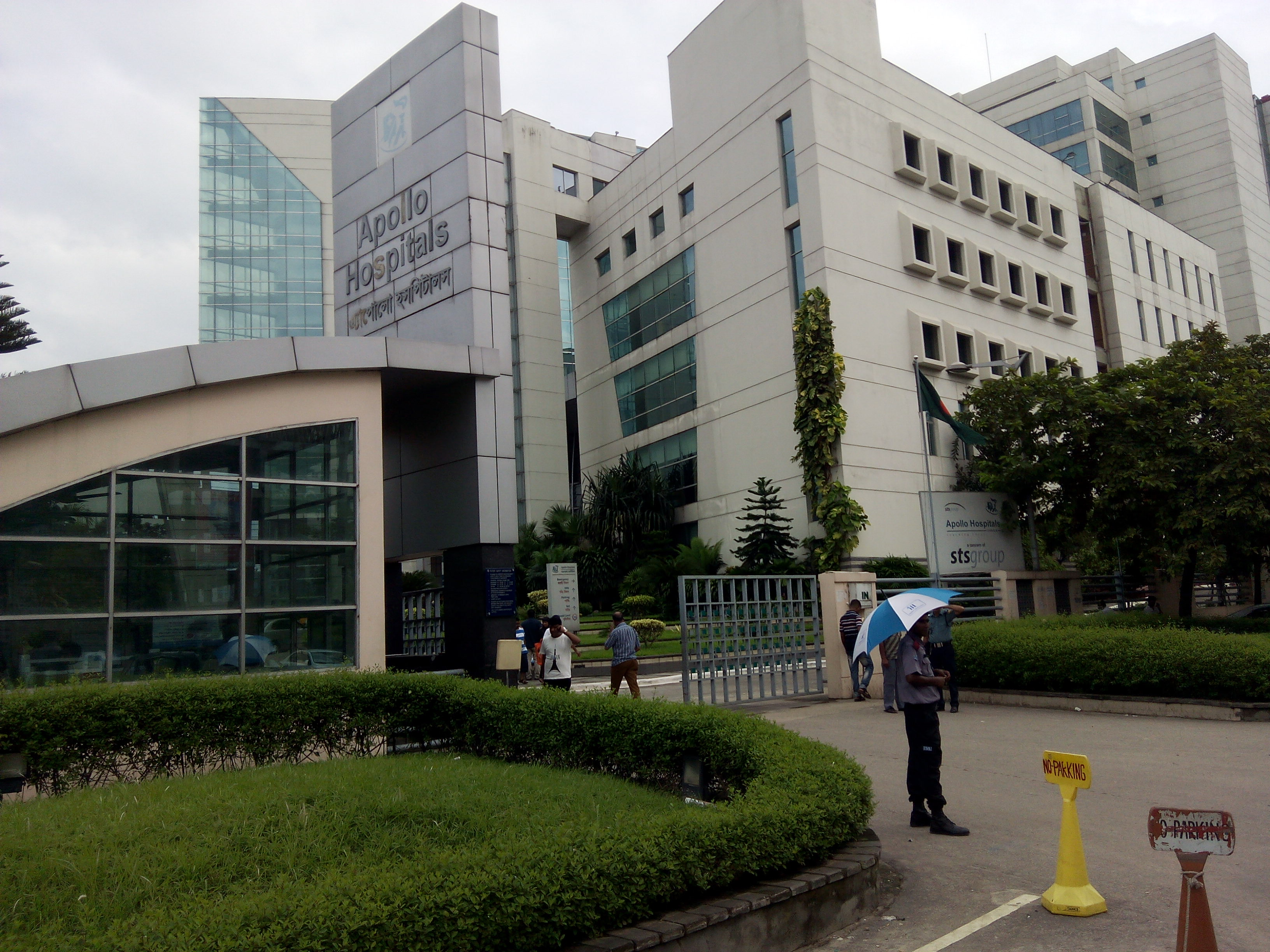
Evercare Hospital Dhaka in 2014 when it was part of Apollo Hospitals, Dhaka

Bashundhara Residential Area, or simply Bashundhara, (Bengali: বসুন্ধরা আবাসিক এলাকা) is an upscale residential and semi-business neighbourhood in Dhaka, Bangladesh. Described as a "city inside a city," the area is the largest private real estate project in Greater Dhaka. It is owned and operated by East West Property Development Pvt. Ltd., a subsidiary of Bashundhara Group.

== History ==
The project of Bashundhara was started in the 1980s. In 2011, portions of the housing project was declared illegal, In 2014, a cabinet committee changed the Dhaka detailed plan to make the project legal. The project was built on area made from filling low-lying marshland and flood flow zones. The project has sold over 10,000 residential plots as of 2005.

== Notable institutions ==
=== Corporate offices ===
- Walton Group, electronics and electrical goods manufacturer.
- Grameenphone- the headquarters of the company are located in the area.
- Bashundhara Group headquarters and corporate office are located here.
- Bangladesh Pratidin - the highest circulated newspaper in Bangladesh.
- T Sports
- News24

=== Medical institutions ===
- Evercare Hospital Dhaka
- Bashundhara Eye Hospital

== Education ==
- Islamic Research Center Bangladesh
- Independent University, Bangladesh (IUB)
- North South University (NSU)
- International School Dhaka
- Playpen
- Hurdco International School
- Ebenezer International School
- The Aga Khan Academy
- Sunnydale School
- Reverie School
