= Playpen (school) =

Location
- House - 545/A, Block – J, Road - 19, Bashundhara Residential Area; Dhaka, 1229; Bangladesh

Information
- Type: School
- Motto: Enter to Learn, Leave to serve
- Established: 1977
- Founder: Zeba Khan
- Principal: Sorabon Tohura
- Grades: Playgroup-12
- Language: English
- Website: www.playpen.edu.bd

Playpen is a playgroup to grade 12 English-medium school in Bashundhara Residential Area, Dhaka, Bangladesh that was established in 1977 by Zeba Khan. It follows the curriculum of Cambridge International Examination (O-level) and Advanced Level (A-level) examinations.

It had three more principals since, Sabera Parveen Harun, Shahriar Quader and the incumbent principal, Sorabon Tohura respectively. The school has a handball, football and basketball team. It also has a debate, baking, table tennis and drama club.

== See also ==
- List of schools in Bangladesh
