= Apollo Imperial Hospitals =

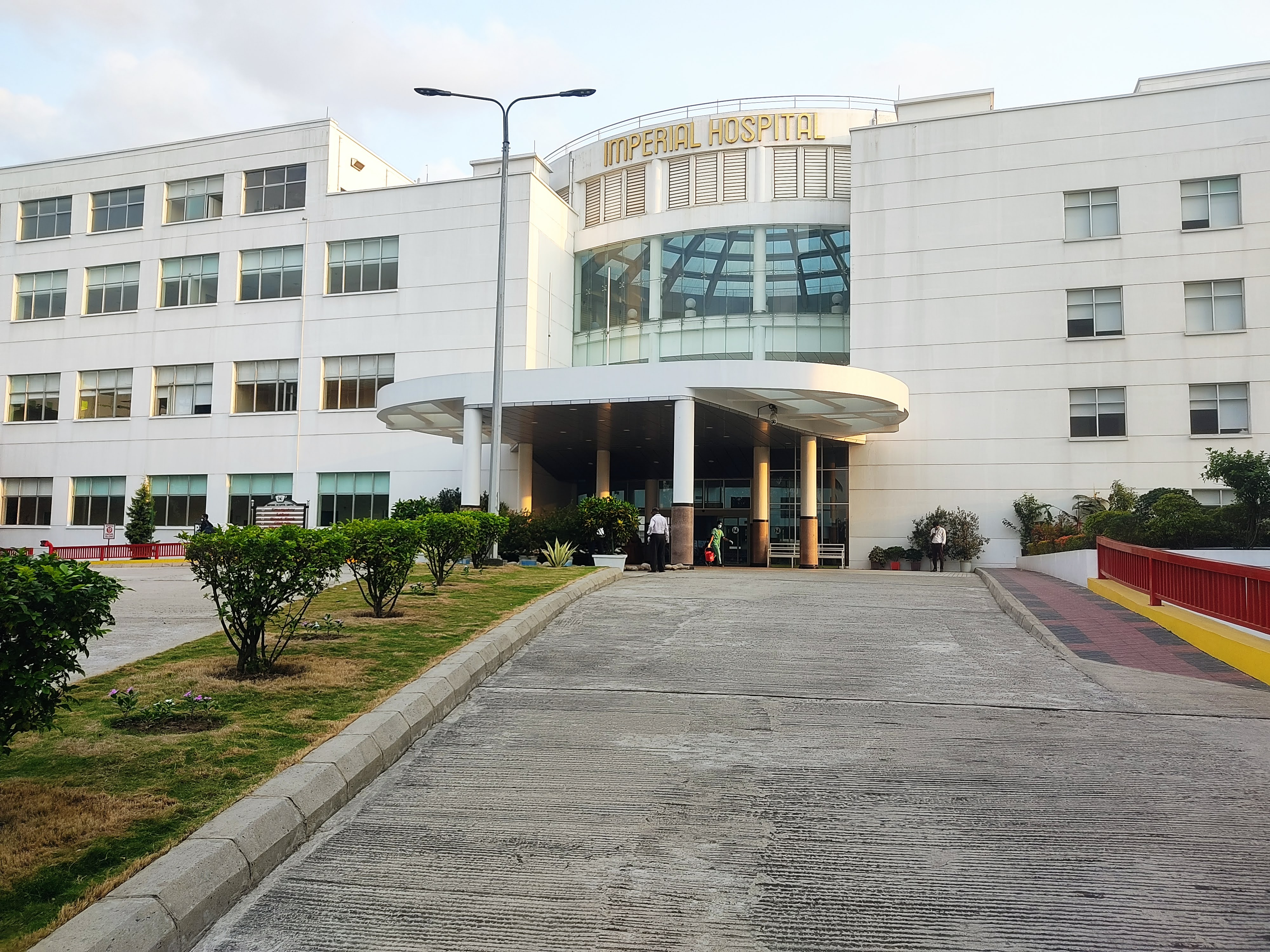

Geography
- Location: Zakir Hossain Road, Pahartali, Chittagong, Bangladesh
- Coordinates: 22.3591969°N 91.7931206°E

Organisation
- Care system: Private
- Type: Private

Services
- Standards: International
- Beds: 375

History
- Founded: April 2019

Links
- Website: aihlbd.org
- Lists: Hospitals in Bangladesh
- Building details

General information
- Location: Zakir Hossain Road, Pahartali

Technical details
- Floor area: 660,000 square feet (61,000 m^{2})

Design and construction
- Architect: Kaplan McLaughlin Diaz (KMD)

The Apollo Imperial Hospitals is a private hospital in Chittagong, Bangladesh. It was opened in April 2019 with an inauguration ceremony launched by Devi Shetty, Indian cardiac surgeon and entrepreneur.

== History and background ==
The construction of Imperial Hospital Limited is ৳800 crore (US$65 million) funded by the Chattogram Eye hospital and Training Board Trust, and ৳200 crore (US$16 million) invested by the World Bank. In 2015, the hospital authority signed a contract with an Austrian-based healthcare consultancy group Vamed Engineering GmbH & Co KG for construction. Its design and drawings were prepared by US-based healthcare architectural and engineering consultant firm Kaplan McLaughlin Diaz. Around 7.5 acres (3.0 ha) of land were reserved for the construction the medical complex.

In 2022, after partnership with the Chennai based health group Apollo Hospitals, it was renamed as Apollo Imperial Hospitals. Under this agreement, it will operate and manage the hospital.

== Medical facilities ==
With advanced medical equipment spread out with a floor area of 660,000 square feet (61,000 m^{2}), the 375-bed Imperial Hospital situated into five buildings with four interconnected. In other facilities the hospital has 88 single cabins, 76 double cabins, 14 modular operating theatres, 16 nurses stations, 62 consulting rooms with outpatient department facilities, 64 critical care beds, 44 beds for newborn, neonatal intensive care unit with 44 beds, and eight pediatric intensive care unit (ICU).

== Gallery ==
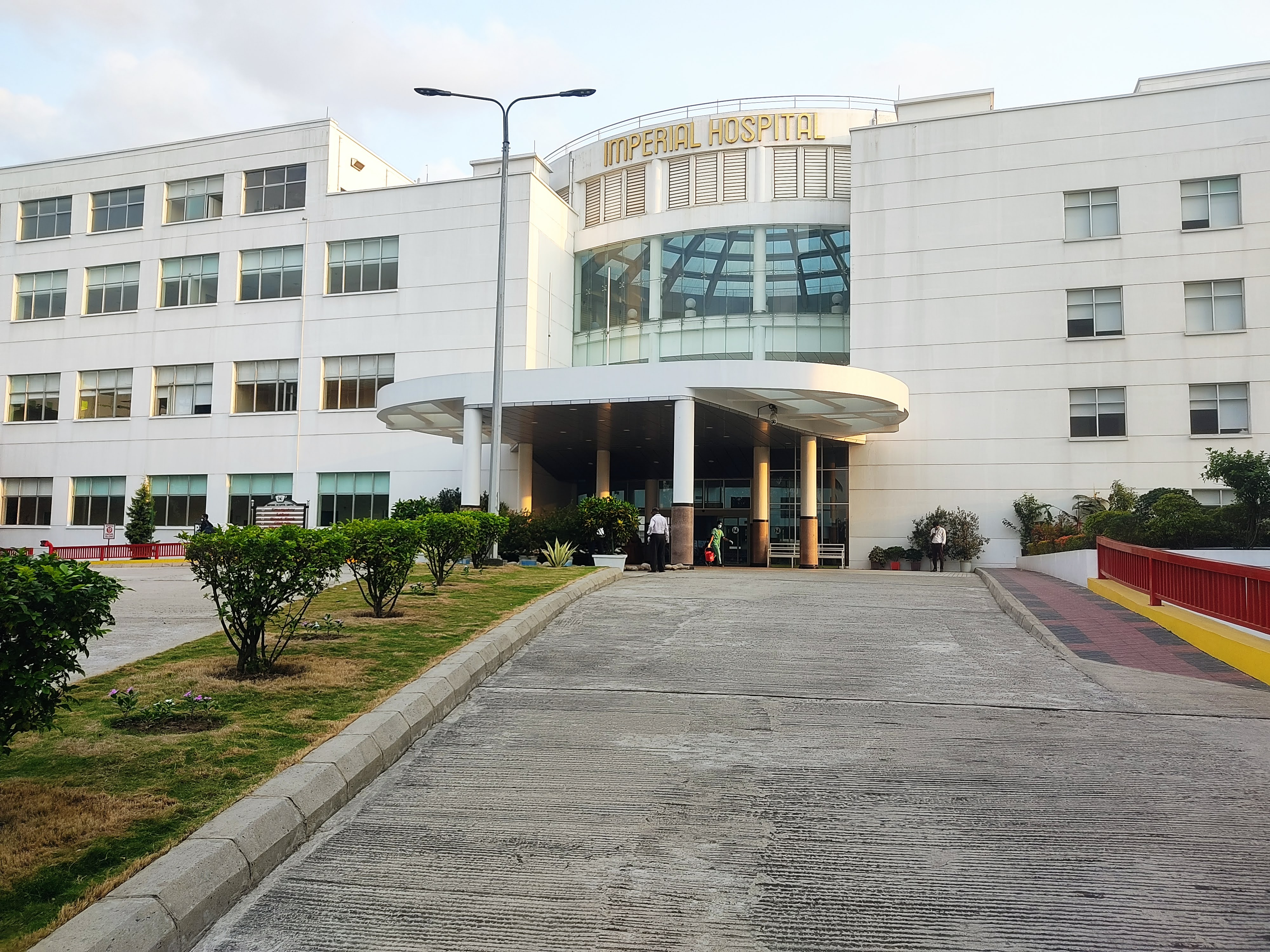

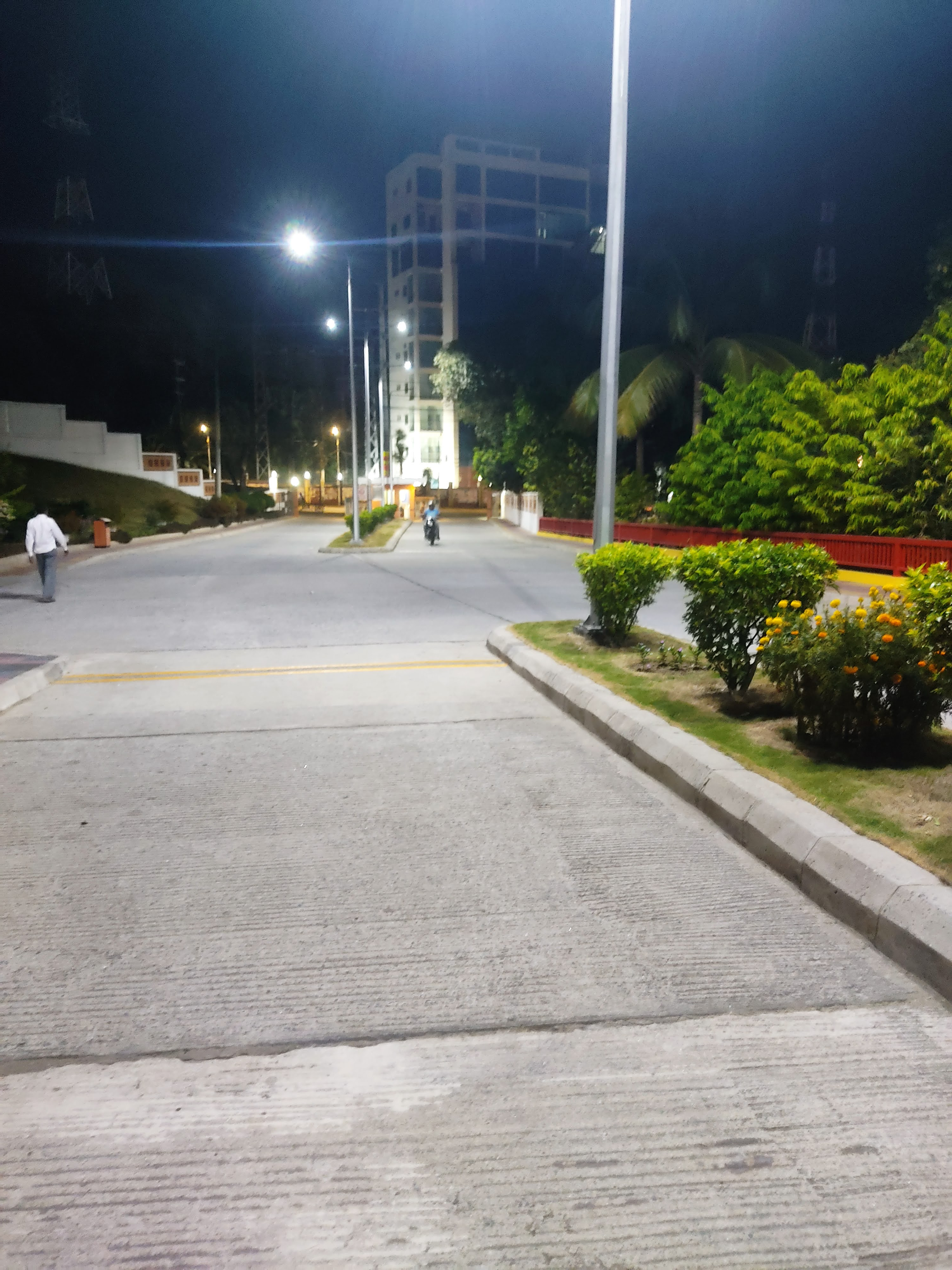

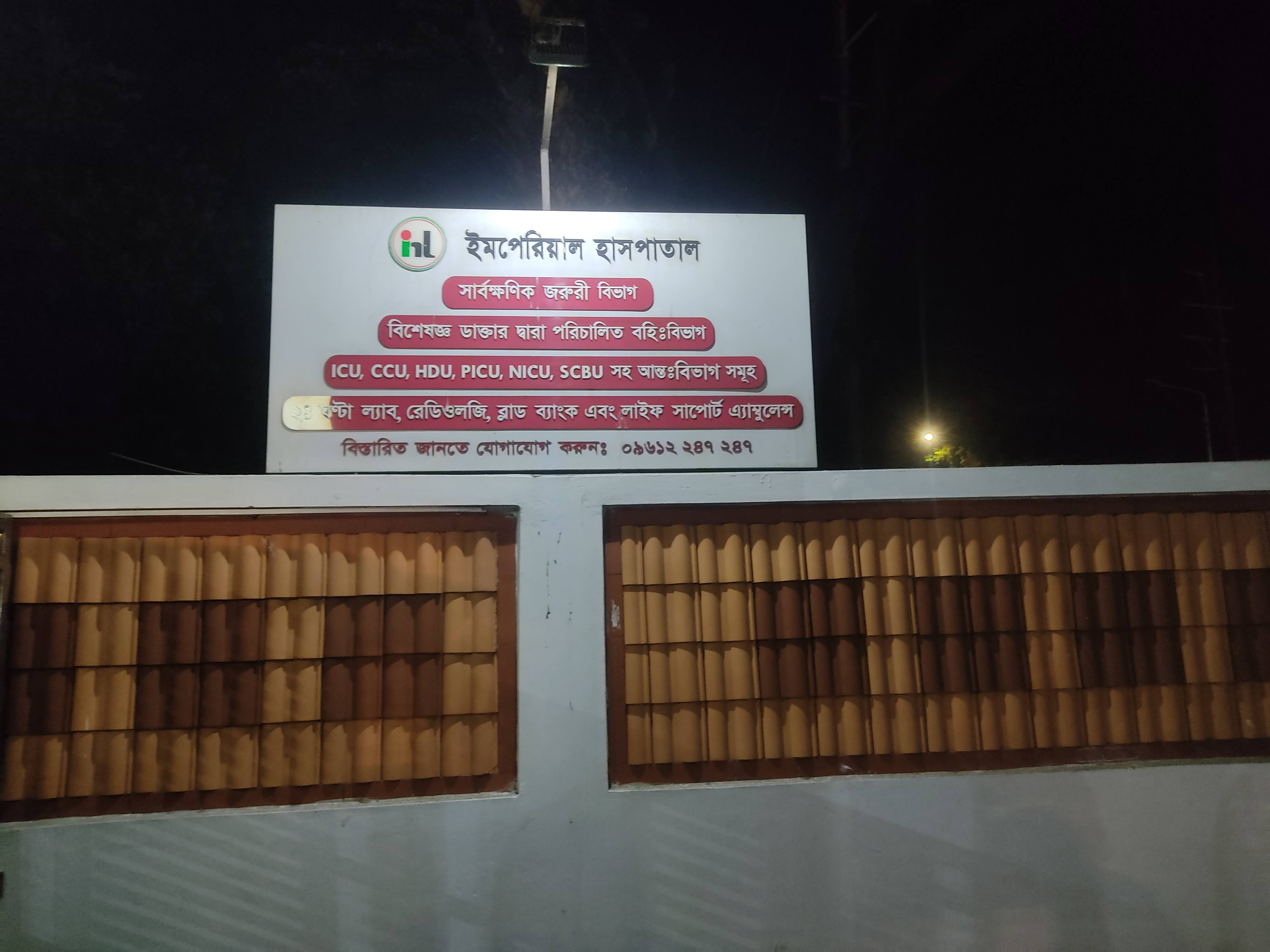

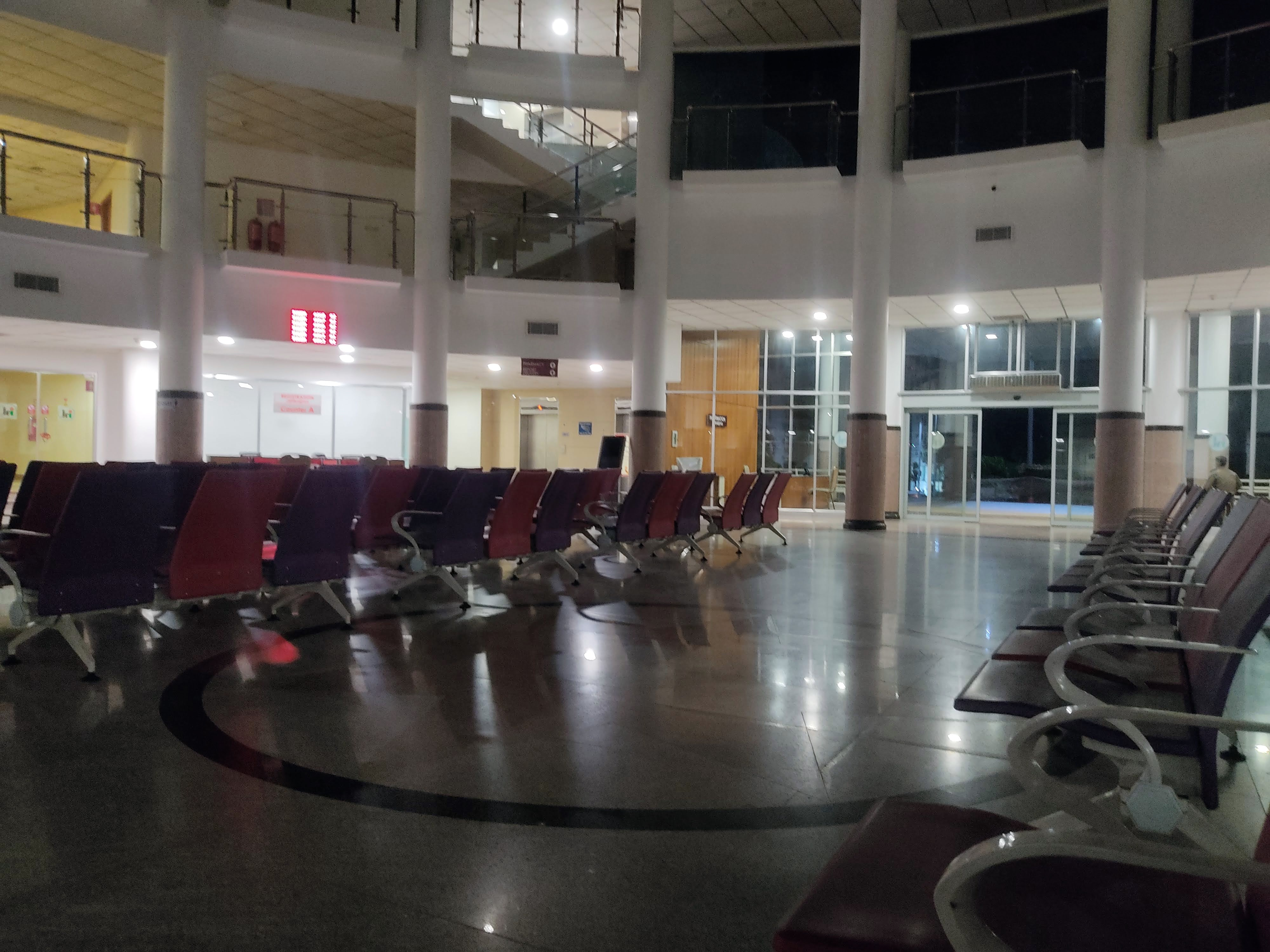

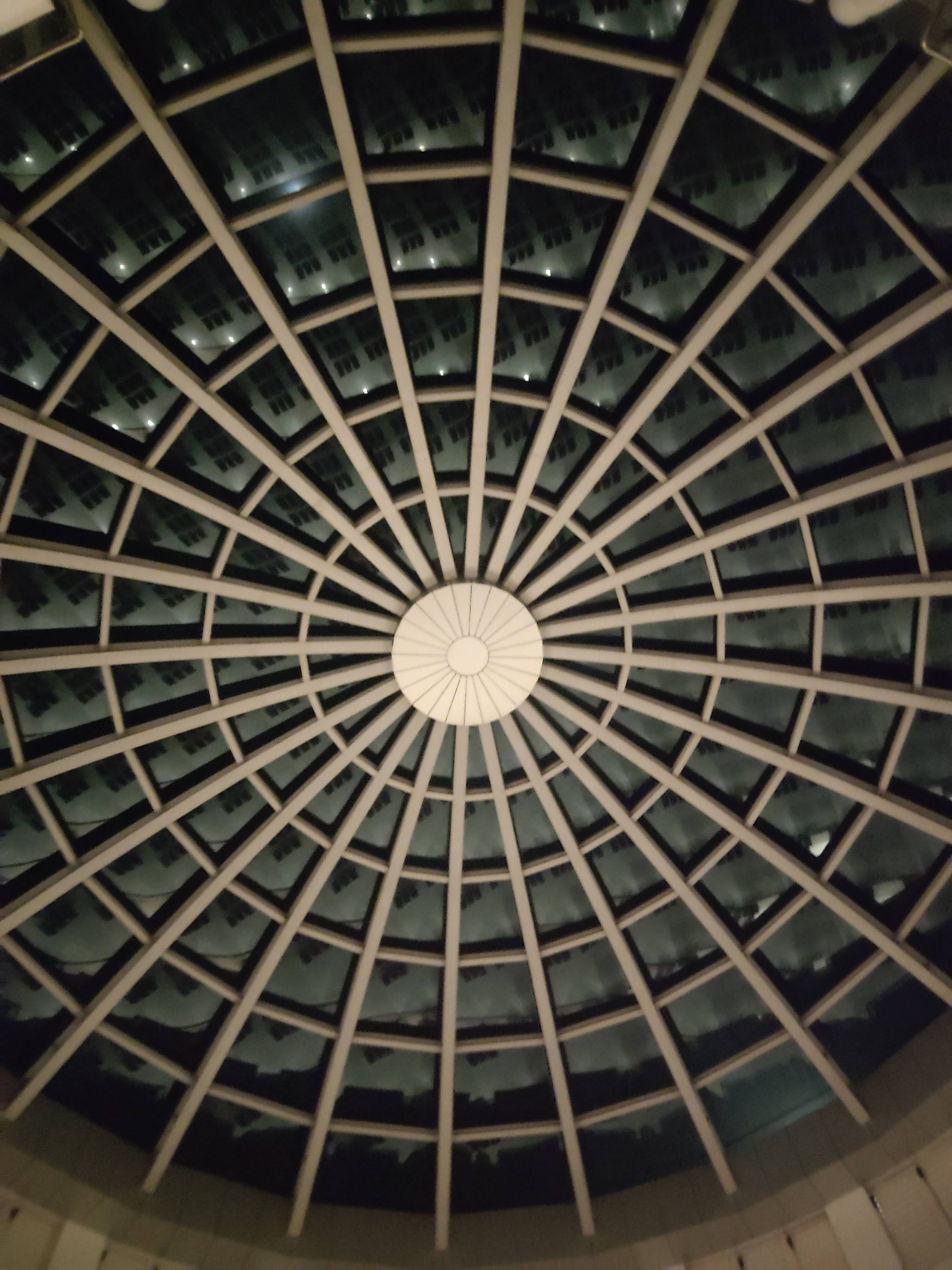

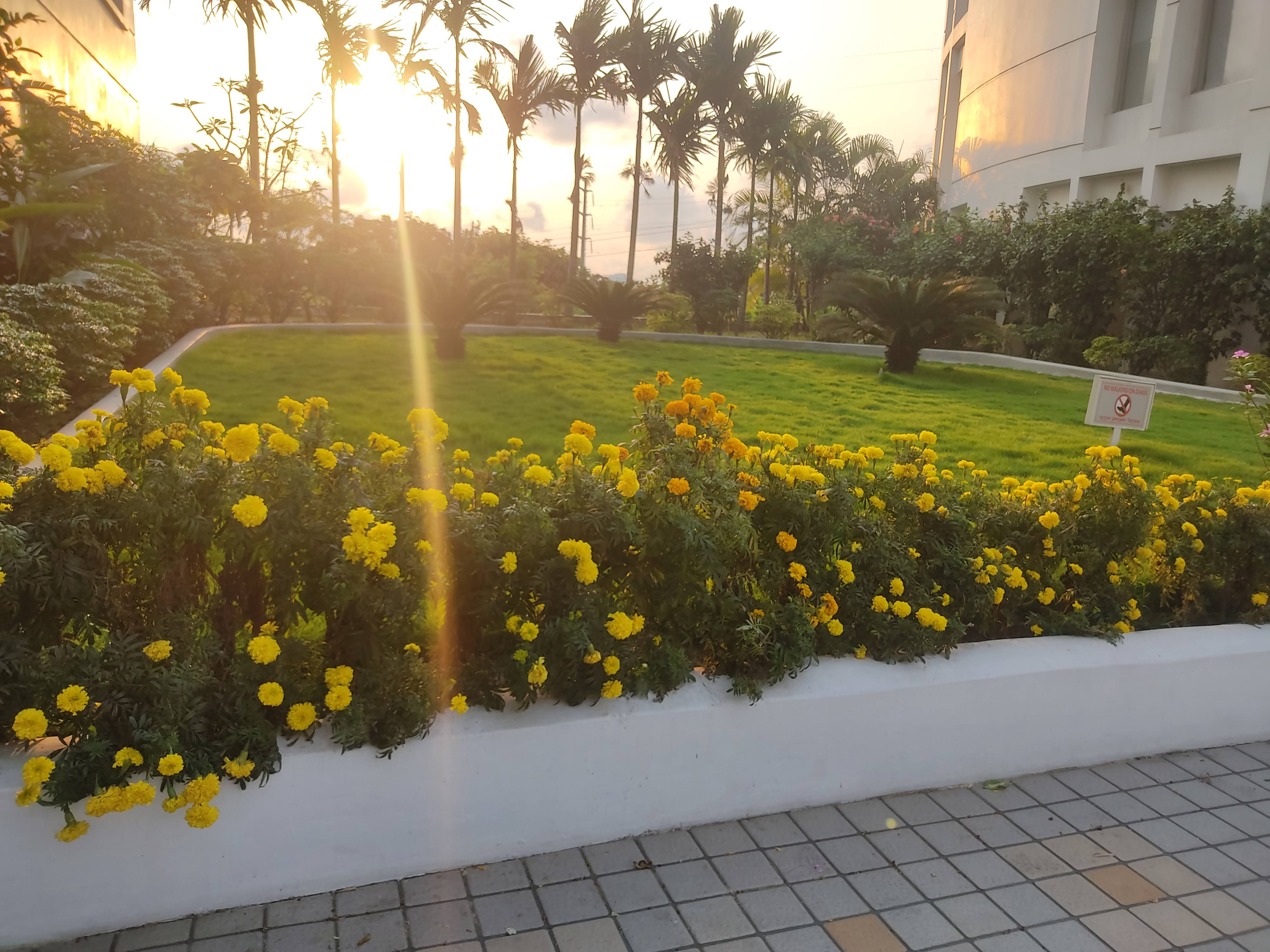
