= International School Dhaka =

International School Dhaka (ISD)
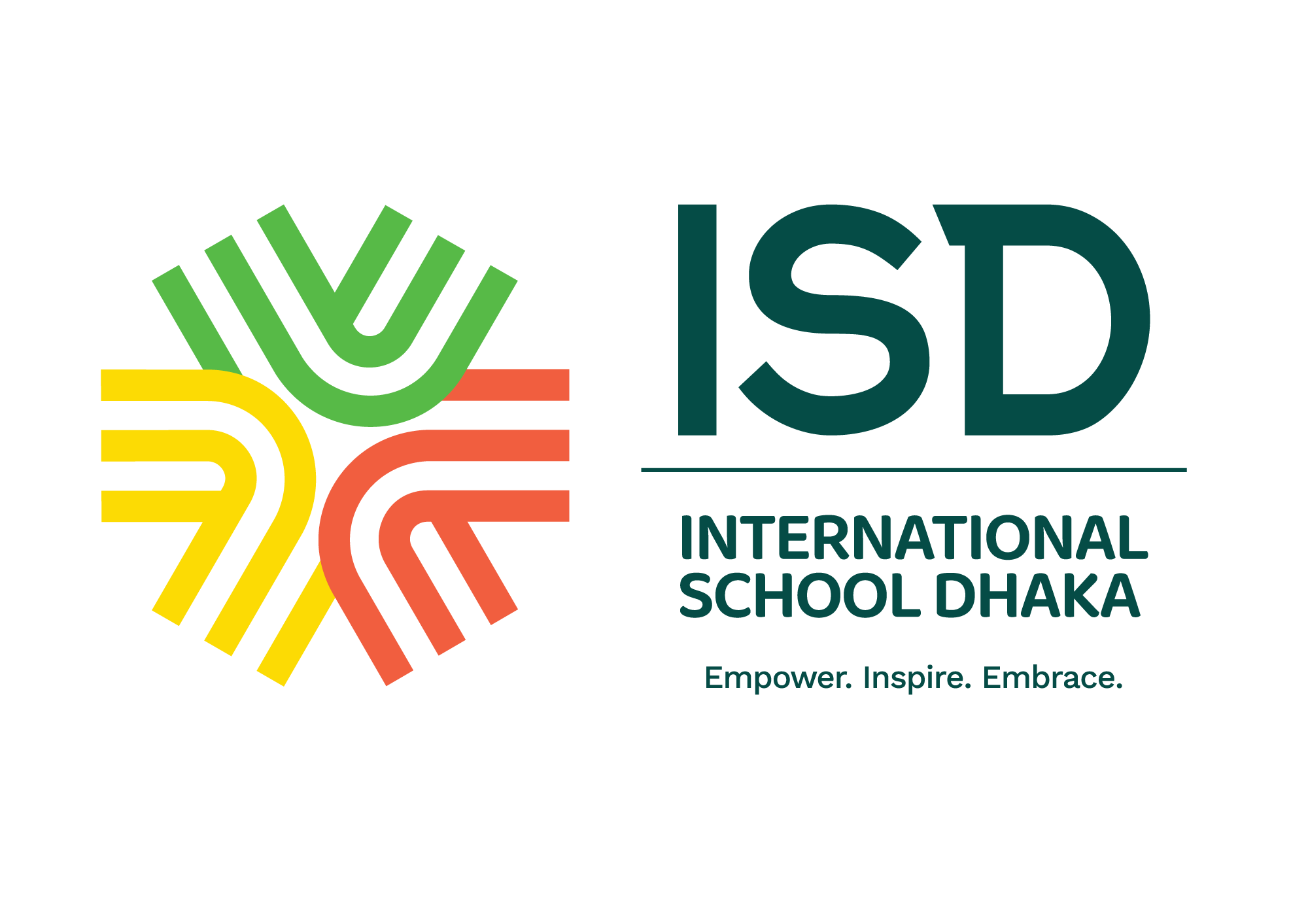

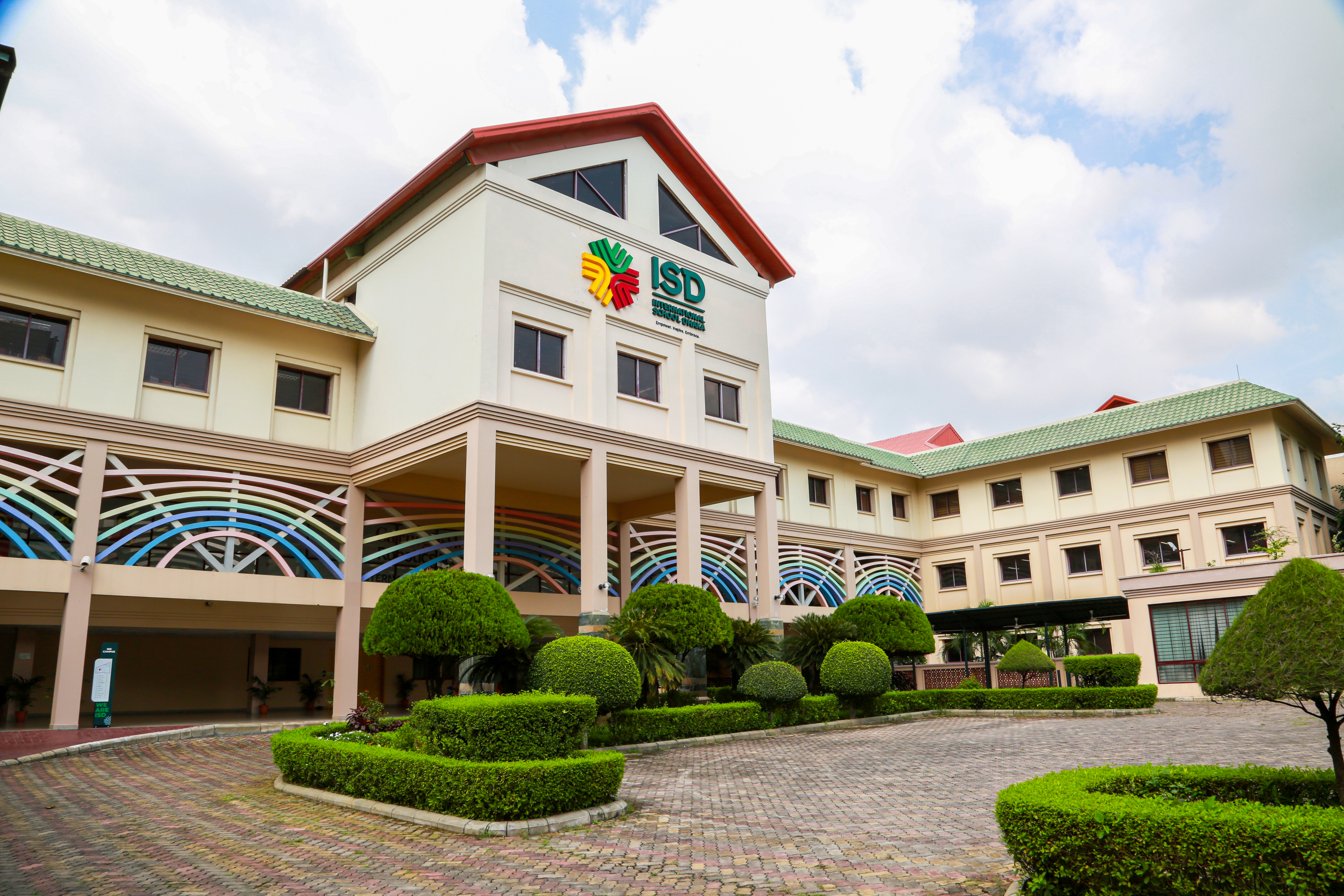
- ISD Admin Building

Location
- Plot 80, Block E, Bashundhara R/A, 1229; Dhaka; Bangladesh; 23.8115°N 90.4317°E

Information
- Type: IB World School
- Established: 1999
- Director: Dr. Mike Miller
- Grades: Playgroup - 12th
- Gender: co-educational
- Age range: 2–18
- Campus size: 5.5 acres (2.2 ha)
- Campus type: Non-residential
- Colors: Red, Green and Yellow
- Team name: ISD Hawks
- Newspaper: https://www.isdbd.org/p/~board/newsletter-2026/
- Affiliation: International Baccalaureate World School
- Website: www.isdbd.org

International School Dhaka (ISD) is an International Baccalaureate (IB) World School in Dhaka, Bangladesh that was established in 1999. The school enrolls students in the age range of 2–18, from Playgroup through to Grade 12, providing an international education for local and expatriate children living in Bangladesh. There are over 70 international teachers or administrators from about 20 different nationalities. The school is recognized by the Bangladesh Ministry of Education and is accredited by the Council of International Schools, the New England Association of Schools and Colleges and authorized by the International Baccalaureate Organization.

== History ==
ISD is part of STS Educational Group Limited.

In 1998, the STS Group decided to diversify into the supply of educational and medical services and consequently set up subsidiaries. It acquired land in Bashundhara Residential Area; a site in the northeast quadrant of the city. The International School Dhaka (ISD) was granted NEASC accreditation on 4 November 2004 and CIS accreditation on 25 November 2004.

== Curriculum ==
The curriculum comprises the Early Years and the International Baccalaureate Primary Years Programme (PYP), Middle Years Programme (MYP) and the Diploma Programme. The average class size in Playgroup to Kindergarten is 13 students, in Primary School is 16, and in Secondary School is 18.

Authorized to offer the IB Diploma Programme since May 2005, the programme is taught in English. Students at this school usually take IB exams in May.

== Academic Achievements ==
In the year 2007, ISD ranked number one in the Bangladesh Debate Council (BDC)'s 3rd BDC Pre Worlds Ranking.
