= STS Group =

Bangladeshi conglomerate company

- Type: Private
- Industry: Conglomerate
- Founded: 1997; 29 years ago
- Headquarters: Dhaka, Bangladesh
- Key people: Bhagwan W. Kundanmal (Group Chairman), Khondoker Monir Uddin (Managing Director)
- Products: Healthcare and education
- Website: stsgroupbd.com

STS Group is a Bangladeshi conglomerate company servicing healthcare and education. Under the Group, two subsidiary companies namely STS Holdings Ltd for Healthcare and STS Capital Limited (former STS Educational Group Ltd) for Education sector was formed. The majority of the shares are owned by British International Investment, a United Kingdom government investment fund.

== History ==
STS Group was founded in 1997 by merging Shanta Group, Tropica Group and Sepal Group, the three business houses that were operating independently. The acronym S-T-S came from the first three letters of these three corporate business houses in Bangladesh. The group's goal was to provide healthcare and education with participation of local and foreign entrepreneurs.

It established International School Dhaka in 1998 and is located in Bashundhara Residential Area.

It established International Training Centre in 2006.

In 2005, it started Apollo Hospital Dhaka which would be rebranded to Evercare Hospital in 2020.

STS Group established DPS STS School as a joint venture with the Delhi Public School in 2009 at Sector 15 of Uttara. The school was inaugurated by Nurul Islam Nahid, Minister of Education, and Rashed Khan Menon, member of parliament, in August 2009. Glenrich International School was established in Sunvalley Abashon Project, a housing project in eastern Dhaka.

Universal College Bangladesh was created as a partner of the Australian Monash University and awards degrees from Monash. In 2022, it started offering degrees from London School of Economics and the University of London.

STS Nursing College was established in 2019.

In 2020, STS Holdings Ltd. sold their majority shares to the CDC Group, which is owned by the United Kingdom government through British International Investment. The Minister of Commerce of Bangladesh, Tipu Munshi, is a shareholder of the STS Group.

In 2021, the under construction Apollo Hospital Chattogram was renamed to Evercare Hospitals Chattogram.

== List of companies ==
Education

- International School Dhaka
- DPS STS School
- Glenrich International School
- Universal College Bangladesh (UCB)

Healthcare

- STS Nursing College

== Board of directors ==
Name	Position	Reference
Bhagwan W. Kundanmal	Chairman	
Khondoker Monir Uddin	Managing Director	
Mohammad A Moyeen	Director	
Deepak Bhojwani	Director	

== See also ==
- List of companies of Bangladesh
