= Nurses' station =

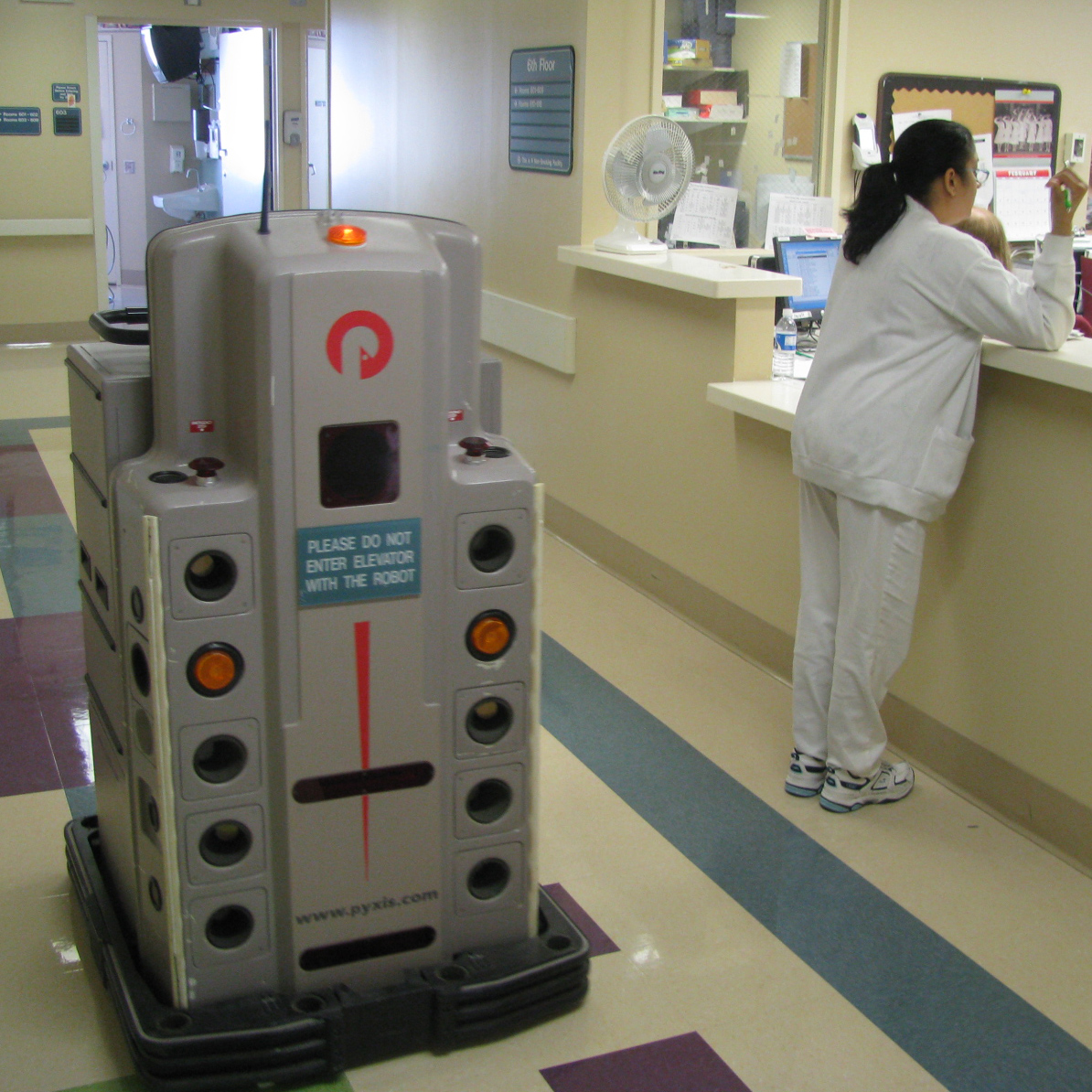
A nurses' station on the right (2008)

A nurses' station is an area of a health care facility (such as a hospital ward or nursing home), which nurses and other health care staff work behind when not working directly with patients and where they can perform some of their duties. The station has a counter that can be approached by visitors and patients who wish to receive attention from nurses. Stored behind the table are materials for which access is limited to health care staff, such as patient files, medicines, and certain types of equipment.

The nurses' stations not only carry out administrative tasks, but also clinically associated functions that have impact on the delivery of care to the patients. The key functions performed are:

1. Inquiries, information and referrals
2. Secretarial work
3. Chart processing and Management
4. Monitoring of patients
5. Medication preparation.
