= Electoral history of Hussain Muhammad Ershad =

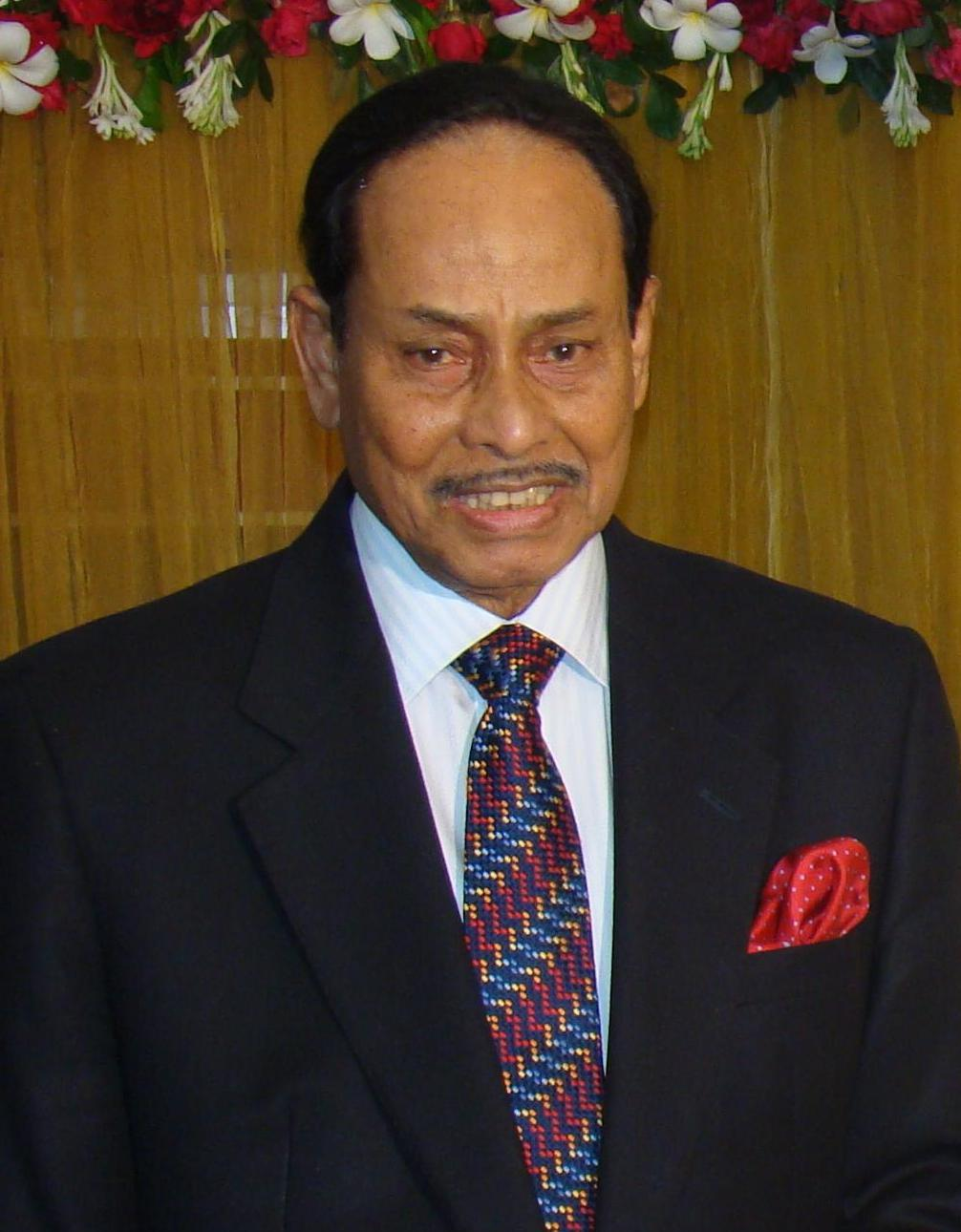
Hussain Muhammad Ershad

This is a summary of the electoral history of Hussain Muhammad Ershad, a Bangladeshi military officer and politician who served as the president of Bangladesh from 1983 to 1990.

== Summary ==
=== Presidential elections ===
Year	Party	Votes	%	Result
1985	Independent	32,661,233	94.47	Won
1986	JP(E)	21,795,337	84.10	Won

=== Jatiya Sangsad elections ===
Year	Constituency	Party	Votes	%	Result
1991	Rangpur-1	JP(E)	50,004	56.5	Won
1991	Rangpur-2	JP(E)	50,221	45.4	Won
1991	Rangpur-3	JP(E)	86,114	67.3	Won
1991	Rangpur-5	JP(E)	71,132	50.2	Won
1991	Rangpur-6	JP(E)	35,260	38.4	Won
June 1996	Rangpur-2	JP(E)	66,929	47.7	Won
June 1996	Rangpur-3	JP(E)	1,05,590	69.7	Won
June 1996	Rangpur-5	JP(E)	87,387	51.5	Won
June 1996	Rangpur-6	JP(E)	60,665	52.0	Won
June 1996	Kurigram-3	JP(E)	67,262	60.0	Won
2008	Rangpur-3	JP(E)	2,39,046	89.5	Won
2008	Kurigram-2	JP(E)	2,09,505	72.7	Won
2008	Dhaka-17	JP(E)	1,23,936	66.9	Won

== Detailed results ==
=== 1985 military rule referendum ===
Choice	Votes	%
For	32,661,233	94.47
Against	1,911,281	5.53
Total	34,572,514	100.00
Registered voters/turnout	47,910,964	–
Source: Nohlen et al.

=== 1986 presidential election ===
Candidate	Party	Votes	%
Hussain Muhammad Ershad	Jatiya Party	21,795,337	84.10
Muhammadullah Hafezzi	Independent	1,510,456	5.83
Syed Faruque Rahman	Bangladesh Freedom Party	1,202,303	4.64
Nine other candidates		1,408,195	5.43
Total		25,916,291	100.00
Valid votes		25,916,291	98.55
Invalid/blank votes		380,745	1.45
Total votes		26,297,036	100.00
Registered voters/turnout		47,912,443	54.89
Source: Nohlen et al.

=== 1991 general election ===
Hussain Muhammad Ershad stood from jail for five seats in the 1991 general election: Rangpur-1, Rangpur-2, Rangpur-3, Rangpur-5, and Rangpur-6. After winning all five, he chose to represent Rangpur-3 and quit the other four.

General Election 1991: Rangpur-1
Party	Candidate	Votes	%	±%
JP(E)	Hussain Muhammad Ershad	50,004	56.5	
AL	Md. Mojibar Rahman Pramanik	20,310	22.9	
JI	Shah Md. Ruhul Islam	15,515	17.5	
Bangladesh National Awami Party (Muzaffar)	Md. Sekendar Ali	1,220	1.4	
BNP	Md. Shah Emdadul Haq	695	0.8	
Zaker Party	Md. Ruhul Amin	464	0.5	
WPB	Md. Chad Miah	234	0.3	
UCL	A. K. M. Shirazul Islam	102	0.1	
Majority		29,694	33.5	
Turnout		88,547	54.3	
JP(E) hold				

General Election 1991: Rangpur-2
Party	Candidate	Votes	%	±%
JP(E)	Hussain Muhammad Ershad	50,221	45.4	
AL	Anisul Haque Chowdhury	45,206	40.9	
JI	Shah Muhammad Nur Hossain	7,676	6.9	
Zaker Party	Md. Nazrul Haq	2,601	2.4	
JSD	Md. Abdus Sattar	2,336	2.1	
BNP	Mohsin Ali	2,308	2.1	
Independent	Md. Ilias Ali	299	0.3	
Majority		5,015	4.5	
Turnout		110,647	59.2	
JP(E) gain from				

General Election 1991: Rangpur-3
Party	Candidate	Votes	%	±%
JP(E)	Hussain Muhammad Ershad	86,114	67.3	
Ganatantri Party	Mohammed Afzal	27,938	21.8	
BNP	Md. Rezaul Haq Sarkar	6,049	4.7	
JI	Md. Nazrul Islam	5,911	4.6	
IOJ	Md. Abdus Salam Sarkar	794	0.6	
Zaker Party	Abu Azgar Ahmed	358	0.3	
NAP (Muzaffar)	Md. Khalilur Rahman	232	0.2	
JSD (S)	Md. Habibur Rahman	226	0.2	
Independent	Md. Siddiq Hussain	164	0.1	
Independent	Zohra Alam	115	0.1	
Independent	Mostafa Zafar Haider	96	0.1	
Majority		58,176	45.5	
Turnout		127,997	60.5	
JP(E) hold				

General Election 1991: Rangpur-5
Party	Candidate	Votes	%	±%
JP(E)	Hussain Muhammad Ershad	71,132	50.2	
AL	H. N. Ashequr Rahman	38,810	27.4	
JI	Abu Bakar Wahedi	25,425	18.0	
BNP	Md. Nurul Huda	3,066	2.2	
Zaker Party	Md. Taslim Prodhan	2,000	1.4	
CPB	Md. Ahmmod Ali	408	0.3	
FP	Md. Mojibur Rahman Sarkar	365	0.3	
Independent	Md. Shahzahan Mondol	351	0.2	
Majority		32,322	22.8	
Turnout		141,557	61.3	
JP(E) gain from				

General Election 1991: Rangpur-6
Party	Candidate	Votes	%	±%
JP(E)	Hussain Muhammad Ershad	35,260	38.4	
AL	Md. Matiar Rahman	34,935	38.1	
JI	Abdus Salam Prodhan	10,095	11.0	
Independent	Abdul Jalil Pradhan	4,658	5.1	
JSD	Md. Abdus Sobhan	2,870	3.1	
BNP	Nur Mohammad Mondal	2,750	3.0	
Zaker Party	Md. Azgar Ali	1,198	1.3	
Majority		325	0.4	
Turnout		91,766	55.4	
JP(E) hold				

=== June 1996 general election ===
Hussain Muhammad Ershad stood from jail for five seats in the June 1996 general election: Rangpur-2, Rangpur-3, Rangpur-5, Rangpur-6, and Kurigram-3. After winning all five, he chose to represent Rangpur-3 and quit the other four.

General Election June 1996: Rangpur-2
Party	Candidate	Votes	%	±%
JP(E)	Hussain Muhammad Ershad	66,929	47.7	
AL	Anisul Haque Chowdhury	55,800	39.8	
JI	ATM Azharul Islam	8,273	5.9	
BNP	Paritosh Chakrabarti	4,025	2.9	
Zaker Party	Abdul Hamid Kabir Sharif	3,761	2.7	
JSD	Md. Ruhul Amin	858	0.6	
Independent	Mohammad Ali Sarkar	336	0.2	
Gano Forum	Md. Meser Uddin	190	0.1	
Independent	Merina Rahman	161	0.1	
Majority		11,129	7.9	
Turnout		140,333	77.3	
JP(E) hold				

General Election June 1996: Rangpur-3
Party	Candidate	Votes	%	±%
JP(E)	Hussain Muhammad Ershad	105,590	69.7	+2.4
AL	Md. Siddique Hossain	28,305	18.7	N/A
JI	Mahbubur Rahman Belal	7,890	5.2	+0.6
BNP	Kazi Md. Tareq	6,010	4.0	−0.7
IOJ	Md. Abdur Rahman	1,386	0.9	+0.3
JSD	Md. Shamsul Ajam Khan	1,232	0.8	N/A
Independent	Subrata Ghatak	305	0.2	N/A
Independent	A. K. M. Khairul Anam	198	0.1	N/A
Independent	Mozzammel Hossain	99	0.1	N/A
Independent	Shah Gausul Azam	94	0.1	N/A
Independent	Golam Md. Kader	83	0.1	N/A
Bangladesh Samajtantrik Dal (Mahbub)	Md. Anowar Hossain Bablu	74	0.0	N/A
FP	Md. Faizur Rahman Mithu	67	0.0	N/A
Independent	Moazzem Hossain	57	0.0	N/A
Majority		77,285	51.1	+5.6
Turnout		151,390	69.3	+8.8
JP(E) hold				

General Election June 1996: Rangpur-5
Party	Candidate	Votes	%	±%
JP(E)	Hussain Muhammad Ershad	87,387	51.5	
AL	H. N. Ashequr Rahman	50,839	30.0	
JI	Abu Mozaffar Ahmed	24,531	14.5	
BNP	Md. Nurul Huda	3,305	2.0	
Ganatantri Party	Md. Samsuzzaman	1,263	0.7	
Zaker Party	Md. Taslim Prodhan	1,020	0.6	
Independent	Mozammel Hossain	337	0.2	
FP	Md. Mojibur Rahman Sarkar	326	0.2	
Independent	Golam Mohammad Kader	310	0.2	
Independent	Md. Nozmuch Sakib Pradhan	242	0.1	
Majority		36,548	21.6	
Turnout		169,570	74.1	
JP(E) hold				

General Election June 1996: Rangpur-6
Party	Candidate	Votes	%	±%
JP(E)	Hussain Muhammad Ershad	60,665	52.0	
AL	Md. Matiar Rahman	37,661	32.3	
BNP	Md. Matiur Rahman Chowdhury	9,067	7.8	
JI	Md. Abdus Salam Prodhan	7,577	6.5	
IOJ	Md. Golam Mastofa	832	0.7	
Zaker Party	Md. Azgar Ali	573	0.5	
Independent	Nur Mohammad Mondal	117	0.1	
Independent	Mosammat Merina Rahman	77	0.1	
Majority		23,004	19.7	
Turnout		116,569	68.3	
JP(E) hold				

General Election June 1996: Kurigram-3
Party	Candidate	Votes	%	±%
JP(E)	Hussain Mohammad Ershad	67,262	60.0	+41.7
AL	Md. Amjad Hossain Talukdar	20,408	18.2	−5.5
BNP	AKM Maidul Islam	18,662	16.6	+13.7
JI	Abdul Quddus	3,475	3.1	+0.7
IOJ	Md. Khalilur Rahman	1,029	0.9	N/A
Gano Forum	Md. Abdul Jalil Sarkar	477	0.4	N/A
Zaker Party	Abdul Karim Sarkar	422	0.4	−4.9
Independent	Mosammat Marina Rahman	291	0.3	N/A
Independent	Golam Md. Kader	168	0.1	N/A
Majority		46,854	41.8	+40.8
Turnout		112,194	62.1	+18.6
JP(E) gain from AL				

=== 2008 general election ===
Hussain Muhammad Ershad stood for three seats in the 2008 general election: Rangpur-3, Kurigram-2, and Dhaka-17. After winning all three, he chose to represent Dhaka-17 and quit the other two.

General Election 2008: Rangpur-3
Party	Candidate	Votes	%	±%
JP(E)	Hussain Muhammad Ershad	239,046	89.5	N/A
BNP	Md. Abdul Kaium Mondol	19,640	7.3	−3.6
IAB	A. T. M. Golam Mustafa	5,676	2.1	N/A
CPB	Md. Shahadat Hussain	1,602	0.6	N/A
BSD	Abdul Kuddus	693	0.3	N/A
KSJL	Sayed Ali	341	0.1	N/A
Jatiya Samajtantrik Dal-JSD	Md. Sekendar Rahman Dudu	223	0.1	N/A
Majority		219,406	82.1	+45.3
Turnout		267,221	80.1	+7.8
JP(E) gain from IJOF				

General Election 2008: Kurigram-2
Party	Candidate	Votes	%	±%
JP(E)	Hossain Muhammad Ershad	209,505	72.7	N/A
BNP	Md. Tajul Islam Choudhury	52,374	18.2	+12.0
IAB	Md. Mustafizur Rahaman	24,372	8.5	N/A
BSD	Jahedul Haque Milu	971	0.3	N/A
LDP	Sultan Ahamed	605	0.2	N/A
BDB	Bhudeb Chakrabarti	259	0.1	N/A
Majority		157,131	54.6	+48.0
Turnout		288,032	86.7	+13.7
JP(E) gain from IJOF				

General Election 2008: Dhaka-17
Party	Candidate	Votes	%	±%
JP(E)	Hussain Muhammad Ershad	123,936	66.9	N/A
BNP	Hannan Shah	56,267	30.4	N/A
Bangladesh Kalyan Party	Syad Mohammad Ibrahim	2,773	1.5	N/A
IAB	Md. Shamsul Hoque	1,594	0.9	N/A
BKA	Md. Shidullah Kazi	275	0.1	N/A
KSJL	Saleh Ahamed	174	0.1	N/A
United Citizen Movement	Imtiaz Mahmood	159	0.1	N/A
Jatiya Samajtantrik Dal-JSD	M. A. Rashid	80	0.0	N/A
Majority		67,669	36.5	N/A
Turnout		185,258	70.7	N/A
JP(E) win (new seat)				
