= A. T. M. Azharul Islam =

Bangladeshi politician

- এ. টি. এম. আজহারুল ইসলাম

Member of Parliament
- Incumbent
- Assumed office 17 February 2026
- Preceded by: Ahsanul Hoque Chowdhury
- Constituency: Rangpur-2

5th Secretary-General of Bangladesh Jamaat-e-Islami
- In office 2008–2011
- Ameer: Motiur Rahman Nizami
- Preceded by: Ali Ahsan Mohammad Mojaheed
- Succeeded by: Shafiqur Rahman

Personal details
- Born: 28 February 1952 (age 74) Lohanipara, East Bengal, Pakistan
- Party: Bangladesh Jamaat-e-Islami
- Occupation: Politician

A. T. M. Azharul Islam (Bengali: এ. টি. এম. আজহারুল ইসলাম) is a Bangladeshi politician of the Bangladesh Jamaat-e-Islami. He previously served as the secretary-general of the party. He contested the 1996, 2001, and 2008 general elections for the Rangpur-2 constituency in the Jatiya Sangsad but was not elected. He is the incumbent member of the Jatiya Sangsad, representing the Rangpur-2 constituency.

He served as the party's secretary general until 2012, when he was arrested and charged with war crimes during the Bangladesh Liberation War by the country's International Crimes Tribunal (ICT). He was convicted by the ICT in 2014. His appeal was rejected by the Appellate Division of the Supreme Court in 2019, but he was acquitted after a review by the division in 2025.

== Political career ==
Islam contested the June 1996 Bangladeshi general election as a candidate of Jamaat-e-Islami from Rangpur-2. He received 8,273 votes, the third-highest share, while the winning candidate, Hussain Muhammad Ershad of the Jatiya Party, received 66,929 votes. Islam was the candidate of Jamaat-e-Islami for Rangpur-2 in the 2001 Bangladeshi general election. He came third with 17,788 votes, while the winning candidate, Mohammad Ali Sarkar of the Islami Jatiya Oikya Front, received 91,921 votes.

Islam contested elections from the Rangpur-2 constituency (Badarganj and Taraganj) in the 2008 Bangladeshi general election. He came second with 36,586 votes, while the winning candidate, Anisul Islam Mondal of the Jatiya Party, received 166,271 votes.

In 2010, following the arrest of Jamaat-e-Islami leaders, Azharul Islam stated:

We are observing the situation. The legal battle to free our leaders will continue along with a peaceful movement.

Some leaders described the arrests as a moment of crisis for the party.

In January 2011, he announced that Jamaat-e-Islami was fielding 39 mayoral candidates who would contest elections against the Bangladesh Nationalist Party. In February, as acting secretary general of Jamaat-e-Islami, Islam announced a series of strikes protesting against the policies of the Awami League-led regime. In June 2011, Islam called a joint three-hour strike with Acting Secretary General Mirza Fakhrul Islam Alamgir, protesting a recommendation by the parliamentary special committee on constitutional amendment to remove the neutral caretaker government system. He was one of the accused individuals in a sedition case filed over comments made by Rezaul Karim, former president of Islami Chhatra Shibir, regarding Prime Minister Sheikh Hasina and the home minister. He protested against comments by Manmohan Singh, the then-prime minister of India, who had accused Jamaat-e-Islami of being anti-Indian and a partner of the ISI. He was detained on 20 September 2011 after violent protests by Jamaat-e-Islami activists over the denial of permission to hold a rally demanding the release of its leaders. The protests left 200 people injured; 28 cars were burned, 200 cars were vandalised, roadside shops were damaged, and traffic was disrupted throughout Dhaka. Police filed a case against party activists, including Ameer Mohammad Shafiqur Rahman, for assaulting police officers during the protest.

== War crimes trial ==
Islam was accused of being a commander of Al-Badr's Rangpur branch during the 1971 Bangladesh Liberation War. Al-Badr was a militia that collaborated with Pakistani forces during the war and was involved in the Bangladesh genocide.

On 22 August 2012, Azhar was arrested in Maghbazar. The International Crimes Tribunal (ICT) filed five charges of crimes against humanity, including accusations of genocide, murder, and abduction. At the time, he was serving as the assistant general secretary of Jamaat-e-Islami. His prosecutor at the trial was Nurjahan Begum Mukta. His defence team was composed of senior counsel Abdur Razzaq, Mohammad Shishir Manir, and Imran Siddique. He was accused of involvement in the Jharuarbeel massacre, in which more than 1,200 Hindus were murdered, a pregnant woman was raped at Rangpur Town Hall, and a Mukti Bahini member and his brother were tortured. A woman testified that he was involved in the rape of a pregnant woman for 19 days at Rangpur Town Hall during the war.

In December 2014, he was convicted of war crimes and sentenced to death by the ICT. He was acquitted of the murder of ten people in Rangpur but was convicted of rape at the Rangpur Town Hall and torturing the Mukti Bahini member and his brother at an Al-Badr camp. The three-member tribunal was led by Justice M Enayetur Rahim and included Justice Jahangir Hossain and Justice Anwarul Haque. His reaction after the verdict was, "... Allah will try you, Insha'Allah". Jamaat-e-Islami called for a two-day strike (hartal) following the verdict.

Islam's defence argued that the charges were politically motivated, but his appeals were rejected by the Supreme Court of Bangladesh in 2019. The Appellate Division bench was led by Chief Justice Syed Mahmud Hossain. Islam's principal lawyer at the appeal was Khandaker Mahbub Hossain, a politician of the Bangladesh Nationalist Party. Amnesty International raised concerns about the fairness of his trial, citing irregularities in the proceedings.

Following the fall of the Sheikh Hasina-led Awami League government Jamaat-e-Islami's ameer, Shafiqur Rahman, demanded the release of Islam and the restitution of the party's registration. Jamaat staged protests in Gazipur District demanding his release. On 27 May 2025, he was acquitted by the Appellate Division of the Supreme Court. On 28 May 2025, following a review of the case, he was released from jail.
