= Electoral history of Sheikh Hasina =

Elections featuring Prime Minister of Bangladesh

This is a summary of the electoral history of Sheikh Hasina, who served as the tenth prime minister of Bangladesh from June 1996 to July 2001 and again from January 2009 to August 2024.

== Summary ==
Year	Constituency	Party	Votes	%	Result
1991	Dhaka-7	Awami League	49,362	36.5	Lost
1991	Dhaka-10	Awami League	29,451	37.8	Lost
1991	Gopalganj-3	Awami League	67,945	72.2	Won
June 1996	Bagerhat-1	Awami League	77,342	51.4	Won
June 1996	Khulna-1	Awami League	62,247	53.5	Won
June 1996	Gopalganj-3	Awami League	1,02,689	92.2	Won
2001	Rangpur-6	Awami League	77,991	44.6	Lost
2001	Gopalganj-3	Awami League	1,54,130	94.7	Won
2001	Narail-1	Awami League	78,216	54.6	Won
2001	Narail-2	Awami League	97,195	50.3	Won
2001	Barguna-3	Awami League	55,030	52.5	Won
2008	Rangpur-6	Awami League	1,70,542	80.0	Won
2008	Bagerhat-1	Awami League	1,42,979	68.3	Won
2008	Gopalganj-3	Awami League	158,958	97.1	Won
2014	Rangpur-6	Awami League	148,624	96.8	Won
2014	Gopalganj-3	Awami League	187,185	98.7	Won
2018	Gopalganj-3	Awami League	229,539	99.9	Won
2024	Gopalganj-3	Awami League	249,962	99.4	Won

== Detailed results ==
=== 1991 general election ===
==== Dhaka-7 ====
General Election 1991: Dhaka-7
Party	Candidate	Votes	%	±%
BNP	Sadeque Hossain Khoka	76,601	56.7	
AL	Sheikh Hasina	49,362	36.5	
JI	A. K. M. Abdus Salam	2,262	1.7	
Zaker Party	Sageer Ahmed	2,168	1.6	
JP(E)	Shafiqur Rahman	1,992	1.5	
Bangladesh Janata Party	Begum Razia Alim	757	0.6	
FP	Liyakat Hossain	454	0.3	
Ganatantri Party	Mahmudur Rahman Babu	269	0.2	
Jatiya Samajtantrik Dal-JSD	Nazirul Islam	187	0.1	
Independent	Jahangir Khan	184	0.1	
Independent	Abdur Rahman	159	0.1	
UCL	Naseem Ali	150	0.1	
Independent	Khalilur Rahman	128	0.1	
NDP	Alamagir Hossain	96	0.1	
Independent	Ahmed Aorangajeb Kabir	88	0.1	
Jatiya Janata Party and Gonotantrik Oikkya Jot	Md. Mujibur Rahman Hiru	73	0.1	
JSD (S)	Md. Gofran Miyan	64	0.0	
Independent	Millat Hossain	56	0.0	
Independent	Md. Ibrahim Hossain	48	0.0	
Bangladesh Muslim League (Yusuf)	Md. Foyez Box Kadri	36	0.0	
Bangladesh People's League (Garib A Nawaz)	Nasir Uddin Pannu	28	0.0	
Independent	Abdul Malek Chowdhury	17	0.0	
Jatiyatabadi Gonotantrik Chashi Dal	M. A. Ahsan Atik	15	0.0	
Majority		27,239	20.1	
Turnout		135,194	58.1	
BNP gain from JP(E)				

==== Dhaka-10 ====
General Election 1991: Dhaka-10
Party	Candidate	Votes	%	±%
BNP	Abdul Mannan	45,711	58.6	
AL	Sheikh Hasina	29,451	37.8	
Zaker Party	Idrees Hossain Talukdar	816	1.0	
Bangladesh Janata Party	Harun Ar Rashid Mithu	598	0.8	
IOJ	Abdul Based	438	0.6	
JSD	Mir Hossain Akhtar	435	0.6	
Jatiya Samajtantrik Dal-JSD	A. S. M. Abdur Rab	208	0.3	
Bangladesh Inquilab Party	Ruhul Aamin Chowdhury	59	0.1	
Jatiya Janata Party (Asad)	M. D. Rahman	56	0.1	
Bangladesh Muslim League (Kader)	Md. Humayun Kabir	55	0.1	
NDP	Md. Enamul Karim Shuja	52	0.1	
Bangladesh People's League (Garib A Nawaz)	Jobaida Parvin	43	0.1	
Bangladesh National Congress	Shuvash Chandra Debnath	40	0.1	
Jatiyatabadi Gonotantrik Dal	Md. Zakir Hossain	29	0.0	
Majority		16,260	20.8	
Turnout		77,991	48.2	
BNP gain from JSD				

==== Gopalganj-3 ====
General Election 1991: Gopalganj-3
Party	Candidate	Votes	%	±%
AL	Sheikh Hasina	67,945	72.2	
BKA	Hafez Omar Ahmed	17,256	18.3	
Bangladesh Hindu League	Birendra Nath Moitra	4,246	4.5	
BNP	Omelendro Bishwas	2,116	2.3	
Pragotishi Jatiatabadi Dal (Nurul A Moula)	Sheikh Shawkat Hossein Nilu	1,527	1.6	
Sramik Krishak Samajbadi Dal	Nirmal Sen	1,019	1.1	
Majority		50,689	53.9	
Turnout		94,109	56.0	
AL gain from JP(E)				

=== June 1996 general election ===
Sheikh Hasina stood for three seats in the June 1996 general election: Bagerhat-1, Khulna-1, and Gopalganj-3. After winning all three, she chose to represent Gopalganj-3 and quit the other two, triggering by-elections in them.

==== Bagerhat-1 ====
General Election June 1996: Bagerhat-1
Party	Candidate	Votes	%	±%
AL	Sheikh Hasina	77,342	51.4	+3.2
BNP	Sheikh Mujibar Rahman	47,299	31.4	+0.2
IOJ	Moulana Siddiqur Rahman	9,912	6.6	+6.3
JI	Md. Ahad Ali	8,463	5.6	N/A
JP(E)	S.M. Shafiqul Islam	5,977	4.0	+3.7
Jatiya Samajtantrik Dal-JSD	Surandra Nath Sikdar	586	0.4	−0.9
Bangladesh Tafsil Jati Federation (S.K. Mandal)	Sawpan Kumar Mandal	350	0.2	N/A
Democratic Republican Party	Md. Arafatul Islam	275	0.2	N/A
Zaker Party	Muniruzzaman	234	0.2	−0.3
Independent	Binoy Krisna Poddar	179	0.1	N/A
Majority		30,043	19.9	+2.9
Turnout		150,617	82.8	+23.0
AL hold				

==== Khulna-1 ====
General Election June 1996: Khulna-1
Party	Candidate	Votes	%	±%
AL	Sheikh Hasina	62,247	53.5	+5.8
CPB	Acinta Kumar Biswas	19,398	16.7	−6.3
BNP	Profullah Kumar Mandal	11,910	10.2	−4.9
Independent	Md. Ismail Hossain	11,250	9.7	N/A
JP(E)	Binoy Krisna Roy	8,048	6.9	−0.7
JI	Sheikh Md. Abu Yusuf	2,308	2.0	N/A
IOJ	Ataur Rahman Atiq	775	0.7	N/A
Jatiya Samajtantrik Dal-JSD	S. N. Masum	260	0.2	N/A
Zaker Party	K. M. Idris Ali	165	0.1	−0.1
Independent	Md. Akram Sheikh	65	0.1	N/A
Majority		42,849	36.8	+12.2
Turnout		116,426	80.4	+14.1
AL hold				

==== Gopalganj-3 ====
General Election June 1996: Gopalganj-3
Party	Candidate	Votes	%	±%
AL	Sheikh Hasina	102,689	92.2	+20.0
BNP	Bishnu Pad Halder	2,568	2.3	0.0
JI	Abdul Mannan Sheikh	2,512	2.3	N/A
BKA	Md. Shahidul Alam Chowdhury	2,277	2.0	−16.3
Zaker Party	Biswas Fazlul Haque	524	0.5	N/A
JP(E)	Kazi Firoz Rashid	453	0.4	N/A
Pragotishi Jatiatabadi Dal (Nurul A Moula)	Sheikh Showkat Hossain Nilu	374	0.3	−1.3
Majority		100,121	89.9	+36.0
Turnout		111,397	79.8	+23.8
AL hold				

=== 2001 general election ===
Sheikh Hasina stood for five seats in the October 2001 general election: Rangpur-6, Narail-1, Narail-2, Barguna-3, and Gopalganj-3. After winning all but Rangpur-6, she chose to represent Gopalganj-3 and quit the other three, triggering by-elections in them.

==== Rangpur-6 ====
General Election 2001: Rangpur-6
Party	Candidate	Votes	%	±%
IJOF	Nur Mohammad Mondal	90,730	51.9	
AL	Sheikh Hasina	77,991	44.6	
BNP	Abdul Jalil Pradhan	5,237	3.0	
CPB	Kamruzzaman	673	0.4	
Jatiya Party (M)	Md. Abu Hossain Sarkar	171	0.1	
JSD	Md. Abu Alam Mia	89	0.1	
Majority		12,739	7.3	
Turnout		174,891	81.1	
IJOF gain from JP(E)				

==== Gopalganj-3 ====
General Election 2001: Gopalganj-3
Party	Candidate	Votes	%	±%
AL	Sheikh Hasina	154,130	94.7	+2.5
IOJ	Omar Ahmad Saheb	7,223	4.4	N/A
Bangladesh Hindu League	Birendra Nath Moitra	922	0.6	N/A
IJOF	Shishir Chowdhury	410	0.3	N/A
Majority		146,907	90.3	+0.4
Turnout		162,685	87.3	+17.5
AL hold				

==== Narail-1 ====
General Election 2001: Narail-1
Party	Candidate	Votes	%	±%
AL	Sheikh Hasina	78,216	54.6	+8.5
BNP	Dhirendra Nath Saha	61,413	42.9	+18.6
IJOF	Sharif Munir Hossain	2,741	1.9	N/A
WPB	Md. Nazrul Islam	401	0.3	N/A
BKA	A. Quddus Sheikh	237	0.2	N/A
Independent	Md. Lutfar Rahman Sarder	78	0.1	N/A
Jatiya Party (M)	Ishtiaq Hossain Shikder	38	0.0	N/A
Majority		16,803	11.7	−10.1
Turnout		143,124	76.2	+1.5
AL hold				

==== Narail-2 ====
General Election 2001: Narail-2
Party	Candidate	Votes	%	±%
AL	Sheikh Hasina	97,195	50.3	+5.4
BNP	Shahidul Islam	93,081	48.2	+18.2
IJOF	Md. Tozammel Sheikh	1,337	0.7	N/A
WPB	Hafizur Rahman	1,186	0.6	−1.2
Jatiya Janata Party (Asad)	Sheikh Md. Asaduzzaman	148	0.1	−0.1
Independent	Ashok Kundu	74	0.0	N/A
Ganatantri Party	Shamuel Subash Bose	52	0.0	N/A
Jatiya Party (M)	Md. Emdadul Haq Nanu	50	0.0	N/A
Majority		4,114	2.1	−12.8
Turnout		193,123	78.0	−0.2
AL hold				

=== 2008 general election ===
Sheikh Hasina stood for three seats in the 2008 general election: Bagerhat-1, Rangpur-6, and Gopalganj-3. After winning all three, she chose to represent Gopalganj-3 and quit the other two, triggering by-elections in them.

==== Rangpur-6 ====
General Election 2008: Rangpur-6
Party	Candidate	Votes	%	±%
AL	Sheikh Hasina	170,542	80.0	+35.4
BNP	Nur Mohammad Mondal	38,672	18.1	+15.1
JI	Md. Shahjahan Ali	2,138	1.0	N/A
CPB	Kamruzzaman	1,199	0.6	+0.2
Gano Forum	Humayun Izaz Levin	668	0.3	N/A
Majority		131,870	61.8	+54.5
Turnout		213,219	90.0	+8.9
AL gain from IJOF				

==== Bagerhat-1 ====
General Election 2008: Bagerhat-1
Party	Candidate	Votes	%	±%
AL	Sheikh Hasina	142,979	68.3	+12.1
BNP	Sheikh Wahiduzzaman Dipu	58,533	28.0	−15.8
IAB	Md. Liakat Ali	7,522	3.6	N/A
National People's Party	Sheikh Shawkat Hossain	288	0.1	N/A
Majority		84,446	40.3	+28.0
Turnout		209,322	89.4	+7.6
AL hold				

==== Gopalganj-3 ====
General Election 2008: Gopalganj-3
Party	Candidate	Votes	%	±%
AL	Sheikh Hasina	158,958	97.1	+2.4
BNP	S. M. Jilane	4,451	2.7	N/A
Bangladesh Kalyan Party	SM Afzal Hossain	221	0.1	N/A
Majority		154,507	94.4	+4.1
Turnout		163,630	86.8	−0.5
AL hold				
