= Shah Moazzem Hossain =

Bangladeshi politician (1939–2022)

- শাহ মোয়াজ্জেম হোসেন

Deputy Prime Minister of Bangladesh
- In office 20 November 1987 – 6 December 1990
- President: Hussain Muhammad Ershad
- Prime Minister: Mizanur Rahman Chowdhury; Moudud Ahmed; Kazi Zafar Ahmed
- Preceded by: Kazi Zafar Ahmed
- Succeeded by: Position abolished

Minister of Food
- In office 23 December 1989 – 6 December 1990
- Preceded by: Iqbal Hossain Chowdhury
- Succeeded by: Iajuddin Ahmed

Minister of Local Government, Rural Development and Co-operatives
- In office 9 July 1986 – 6 August 1988
- Preceded by: K. M. Aminul Islam
- Succeeded by: Naziur Rahman Manzur

Minister of Information and Broadcasting
- In office 4 August 1985 – 23 March 1986
- Preceded by: Sirajul Hossain Khan
- Succeeded by: Anwar Zahid

1st Chief Whip of Jatiya Sangsad
- In office 7 April 1973 – 6 November 1975
- Speaker: Mohammad Mohammadullah; Abdul Malek Ukil
- Preceded by: Position established
- Succeeded by: Abul Hasnat

Member of Parliament
- In office 12 September 1991 – 24 November 1995
- Preceded by: Abdul Jalil Pradhan
- Succeeded by: Nur Mohammad Mondal
- Constituency: Rangpur-6
- In office 3 March 1988 – 6 December 1990
- Preceded by: Himself
- Succeeded by: A. Q. M. Badruddoza Chowdhury
- Constituency: Munshiganj-1
- In office 7 May 1986 – 3 March 1988
- Preceded by: Position Established
- Succeeded by: Himself
- Constituency: Munshiganj-1
- In office 7 March 1973 – 6 November 1975
- Preceded by: Position Established
- Succeeded by: Muhammad Hamidullah Khan
- Constituency: Dhaka-5

Personal details
- Born: 10 January 1939 Dogachhi, Bikrampur, Bengal Presidency
- Died: 14 September 2022 (aged 83) Dhaka, Bangladesh
- Party: Bangladesh Nationalist Party

Shah Moazzem Hossain (known as SM Hossain; 10 January 1939 – 14 September 2022) was a Bangladesh Nationalist Party politician and the last deputy prime minister of Bangladesh. He was elected as the Jatiya Sangsad member representing the Rangpur-6 constituency as a Jatiya Party candidate in a by-election in September 1991 and served until November 1995.

== Early life and education ==
Hossain was born on 10 January 1939 to a Bengali Muslim family in Dogachhi, Sreenagar in the Bikrampur region of Faridpur district, Bengal Presidency. He was the son of schoolteacher Shah Ahmad Ali. Hossain received his Secondary School Certificate from St. Gregory's High School, Dacca in 1954 and his Higher Secondary Certificate from Dacca College. He graduated with Master of Arts and Bachelor of Laws degrees from the University of Dacca. His son, Rana Hossain, emigrated to the United States of America.

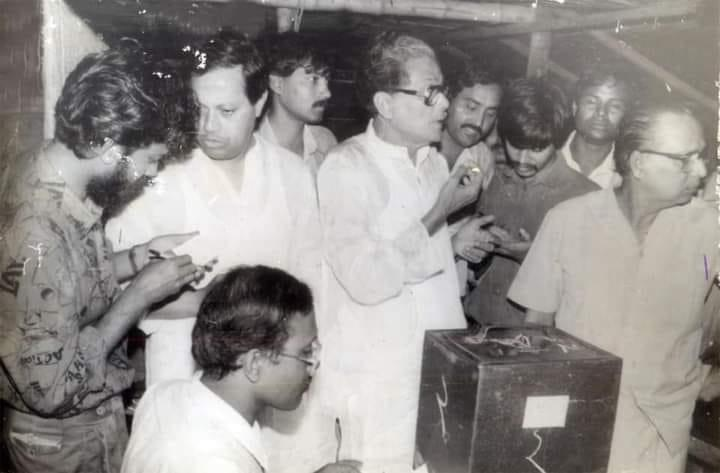
Mizanur Rahman Chowdhury, Barrister Moudud Ahmed and Shah Moazzem Hossain at a vote polling station in Gulshan-2 in 1991

== Career ==
Hossain was active in student politics. He served as the whip of the 1972 Bangladesh Awami League government headed by Sheikh Mujibur Rahman. He was a minister in the cabinet of Khondaker Mostaq Ahmad.

He was elected to parliament from Rangpur-6 as a Jatiya Party candidate in a by-election in September 1991. The by-elections were called after Hussain Mohammad Ershad, who had won five seats including Rangpur-6, chose to resign and represent Rangpur-3.

He joined Jatiya Party led by Hussain Mohammad Ershad but was removed from the party in 1992. He joined Bangladesh Nationalist Party afterwards. He served as Vice-Chairman of Bangladesh Nationalist Party until death.
