= Anisul Islam =

Anisul Islam can refer to:

- Anisul Islam Mahmud
- Anisul Islam Mondal
- Anisul Islam Emon
