= Abul Kalam Azad (Rangpur politician) =

Bangladesh Awami League politician

Member of Bangladesh Parliament
- In office 29 December 2008 – 24 January 2014
- Preceded by: Nur Mohammad Mondal
- Succeeded by: Shirin Sharmin Chaudhury

Personal details
- Born: 26 November 1950 (age 75) Pirganj, East Bengal, Pakistan
- Party: Bangladesh Awami League

Abul Kalam Azad is a Bangladeshi businessman, former freedom fighter in the Liberation War of Bangladesh, Bangladesh Awami League politician and a former member of parliament for Rangpur-6.

== Career ==
Azad was born on 26 November 1950.

He was elected to parliament from Rangpur-6 as a Bangladesh Awami League candidate in an April 2009 by-election. Prime Minister Sheikh Hasina was elected from here and two other constituencies. She choose to represent Gopalganj-3 which triggered by-elections in Rangpur-6 and Bagerhat-1.
