= Electoral history of Sheikh Mujibur Rahman =

Elections featuring Bangladeshi politician

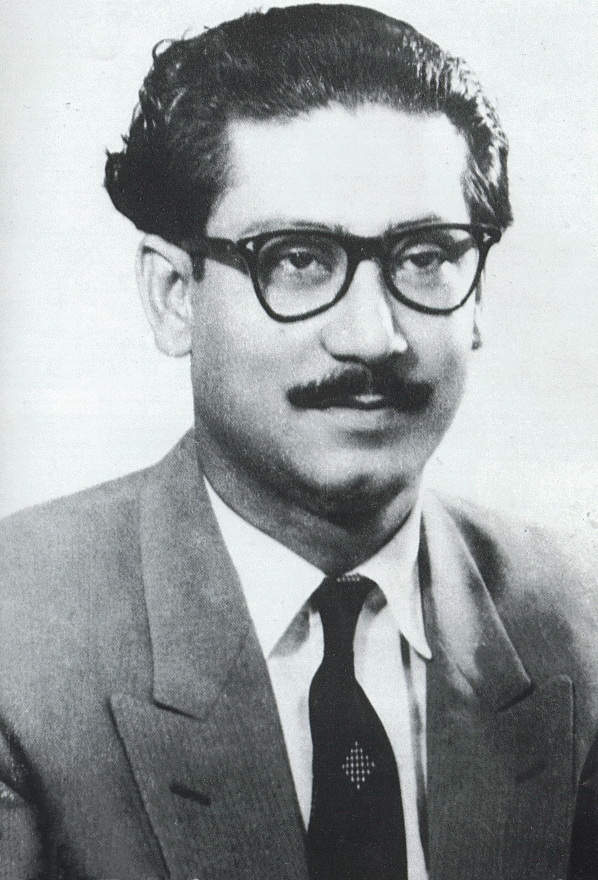
Sheikh Mujibur Rahman

This is a summary of the electoral history of Sheikh Mujibur Rahman, who served as the first presidents and second prime minister of Bangladesh from April 1971 to August 1975.

== Summary ==
Year	Constituency	Party	Votes	%	Result
1954	Gopalganj South Muslim	United Front	19,362	N/A	Won
1970	NE-111 Dacca-VIII (Note: Never took oath as he was arrested on 26 March 1971.)	All-Pakistan Awami League	164,071	57.78	Won
1970	NE-112 Dacca-IX (Note: Vacated.)	All-Pakistan Awami League	122,433	67.67	Won
1973	Dacca-12	Bangladesh Awami League	113,380	N/A	Won
1973	Dacca-15 (Note: Vacated.)	Bangladesh Awami League	81,330	N/A	Won

== Detailed results ==
=== 1954 Legislative Assembly election ===
==== Gopalganj South Muslim ====
1954 Legislative Assembly election: Gopalganj South Muslim
Party	Candidate	Votes	%	±%
UF	Sheikh Mujibur Rahman	19,362	N/A	New
PML	Wahiduzzaman	9,569	N/A	New
Independent	Sharif Samsuddin Ahmad	N/A	N/A	New
Turnout		N/A	N/A	N/A
UF win (new seat)				

=== 1970 General election ===
==== NE-111 Dacca-VIII ====
1970 General election: NE-111 Dacca-VIII
Party	Candidate	Votes	%	±%
AL	Sheikh Mujibur Rahman	164,071	57.78	New
CML	Syed Khwaja Khairuddin	39,949	14.07	New
Turnout		204,020	71.85	N/A
AL win (new seat)				

==== NE-112 Dacca-IX ====
1970 General election: NE-112 Dacca-IX
Party	Candidate	Votes	%	±%
AL	Sheikh Mujibur Rahman	122,433	67.67	New
PNL	Amena Begum	2,245	1.24	New
Independent	Md. Ali Sarkar	1,795	0.99	New
Turnout		126,473	69.91	N/A
AL win (new seat)				

=== 1973 General election ===
==== Dacca-12 ====
1973 General election: Dacca-12
Party	Candidate	Votes	%	±%
AL	Sheikh Mujibur Rahman	113,380	N/A	New
JSD	M.A. Awwal	17,348	N/A	New
NAP(B)	Kazi Zafar Ahmed	5,144	N/A	New
Turnout		N/A	N/A	N/A
AL win (new seat)				

==== Dacca-15 ====
1973 General election: Dacca-15
Party	Candidate	Votes	%	±%
AL	Sheikh Mujibur Rahman	81,330	N/A	New
JSD	Mohammad Abdul Jalil	14,390	N/A	New
Turnout		N/A	N/A	N/A
AL win (new seat)				

== See also ==
- Electoral history of Sheikh Hasina
