= Rangpur-2 =

Constituency of Bangladesh's Jatiya Sangsad

Coordinates: 25.67°N 89.05°E

- Constituency for the Jatiya Sangsad
- District: Rangpur District
- Division: Rangpur Division
- Electorate: 312,816 (2018)

Current constituency
- Created: 1973
- Party: Bangladesh Jamaat-e-Islami
- Member: ATM Azharul Islam
- ← 19 Rangpur-1 21 Rangpur-3 →

Rangpur-2 is a constituency represented in the Jatiya Sangsad (National Parliament) of Bangladesh since 2026 by ATM Azharul Islam of the Bangladesh Jamaat-e-Islami.

== Boundaries ==
The constituency encompasses Badarganj and Taraganj upazilas.

== History ==
The constituency was created for the first general elections in newly independent Bangladesh, held in 1973.

== Members of Parliament ==
Election	Member	Party
1973	Afsar Ali Ahmed	Bangladesh Awami League
1979	Mohammad Amin	Bangladesh Awami League
Major Boundary Changes
1986	Anisul Haque Chowdhury	Bangladesh Awami League
1988	Mohammad Kamal Uddin Haider	Jatiya Party (Ershad)
Sep 1991 by-election	Paritosh Chakrabarti	Jatiya Party (Ershad)
Sep 1996 by-election	Anisul Haque Chowdhury	Bangladesh Awami League
2001	Mohammad Ali Sarkar	Islami Jatiya Oikya Front
2008	Anisul Islam Mondal	Jatiya Party (Ershad)
2014	Ahsanul Hoque Chowdhury	Bangladesh Awami League
2018	Ahsanul Hoque Chowdhury	Bangladesh Awami League
2024	Ahsanul Hoque Chowdhury	Bangladesh Awami League
2026	ATM Azharul Islam	Bangladesh Jamaat-e-Islami

== Elections ==
=== Elections in the 2020s ===
General election 2026: Rangpur-2
Party	Candidate	Votes	%	±%
Jamaat	A. T. M. Azharul Islam	135,556		
BNP	Mohammad Ali Sarkar	80,538		
Majority				
Turnout		259,130		
Registered electors		380,921		
Jamaat gain from AL				

=== Elections in the 2010s ===
Abul Kalam Md. Ahasanul Hoque Chowdhury was elected unopposed in the 2014 general election after opposition parties withdrew their candidacies in a boycott of the election.

=== Elections in the 2000s ===
General Election 2008: Rangpur-2
Party	Candidate	Votes	%	±%
JP(E)	Anisul Islam Mondal	166,271	75.6	N/A
Jamaat	ATM Azharul Islam	36,586	16.6	+7.0
Independent	Mohammad Ali Sarker	14,850	6.8	N/A
IAB	Md. Ripon Sarker	2,177	1.0	N/A
Majority		129,685	59.0	+51.7
Turnout		219,884	87.7	+5.7
JP(E) gain from IJOF				

General Election 2001: Rangpur-2
Party	Candidate	Votes	%	±%
IJOF	Mohammad Ali Sarkar	91,921	48.6	
AL	Anisul Haque Chowdhury	78,163	41.4	
Jamaat	ATM Azharul Islam	17,788	9.4	
Jatiya Party (M)	Md. Khabir Uddin	1,124	0.6	
Majority		13,758	7.3	
Turnout		188,996	82.0	
IJOF gain from AL				

=== Elections in the 1990s ===
Hussain Muhammad Ershad stood from jail for five seats in the June 1996 general election: Rangpur-2, Rangpur-3, Rangpur-5, Rangpur-6, and Kurigram-3. After winning all five, he chose to represent Rangpur-3 and quit the other four, triggering by-elections in them. Anisul Haque Chowdhury of the Awami League was elected in a September 1996 by-election.

General Election June 1996: Rangpur-2
Party	Candidate	Votes	%	±%
JP(E)	Hussain Muhammad Ershad	66,929	47.7	
AL	Anisul Haque Chowdhury	55,800	39.8	
Jamaat	ATM Azharul Islam	8,273	5.9	
BNP	Paritosh Chakrabarti	4,025	2.9	
Zaker Party	Abdul Hamid Kabir Sharif	3,761	2.7	
JSD	Md. Ruhul Amin	858	0.6	
Independent	Mohammad Ali Sarkar	336	0.2	
Gano Forum	Md. Meser Uddin	190	0.1	
Independent	Merina Rahman	161	0.1	
Majority		11,129	7.9	
Turnout		140,333	77.3	
JP(E) hold				

Hussain Muhammad Ershad stood from jail for five seats in the 1991 general election: Rangpur-1, Rangpur-2, Rangpur-3, Rangpur-5, and Rangpur-6. After winning all five, he chose to represent Rangpur-3 and quit the other four, triggering by-elections in them. Paritosh Chakrabarti, of the Jatiya Party, was elected in a September 1991 by-election.

General Election 1991: Rangpur-2
Party	Candidate	Votes	%	±%
JP(E)	Hussain Muhammad Ershad	50,221	45.4	
AL	Anisul Haque Chowdhury	45,206	40.9	
Jamaat	Shah Muhammad Nur Hossain	7,676	6.9	
Zaker Party	Md. Nazrul Haq	2,601	2.4	
JSD	Md. Abdus Sattar	2,336	2.1	
BNP	Mohsin Ali	2,308	2.1	
Independent	Md. Ilias Ali	299	0.3	
Majority		5,015	4.5	
Turnout		110,647	59.2	
JP(E) gain from				
