= Shah Ismail Ghazi =

Muslim preacher of Bengal

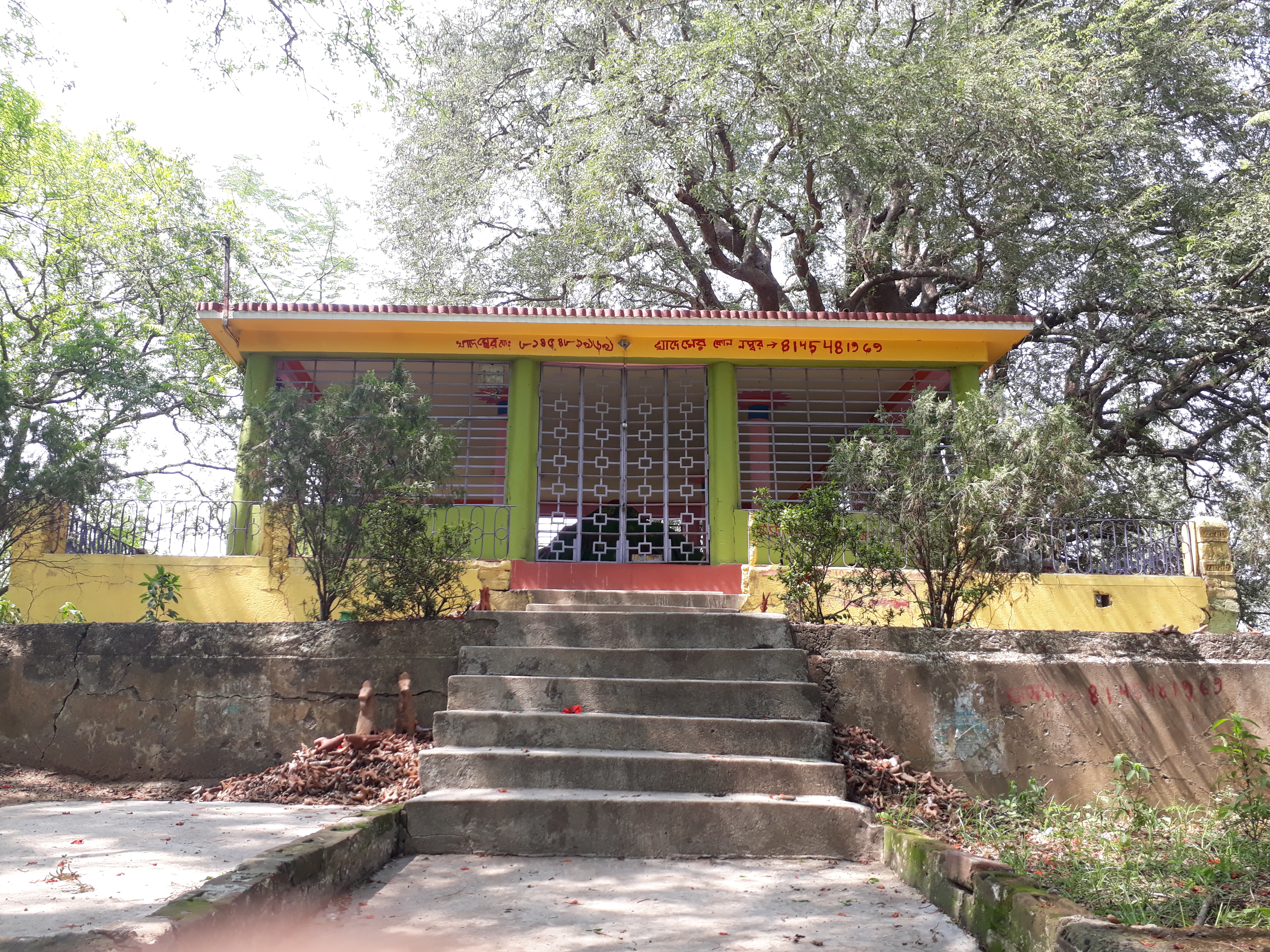
- Tomb of Syed Ismail Gazi at Gar Mandaran
- Born: unknown
- Died: 1474
- Cause of death: Executed on the orders of Sultan
- Burial place: Ghoraghat, Sultanate of Bengal

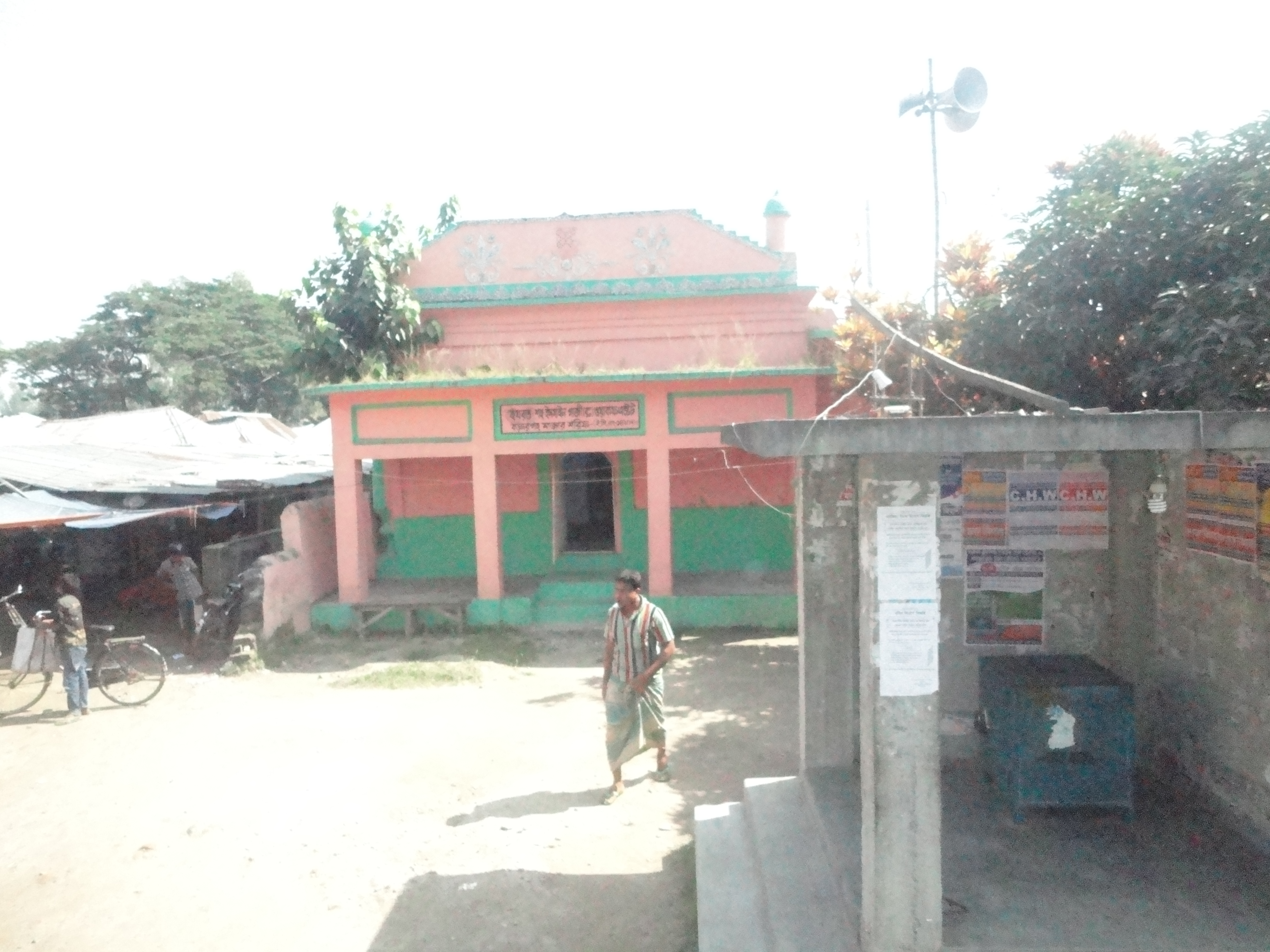
Shah Ismail Ghazi's shrine at Baradarga, Rangpur, Bangladesh

Shah Ismail Ghazi (Bengali: শাহ ইসমাঈল গাজী; died 1474) was a 15th-century Sufi Muslim preacher based in Bengal. He came to Bengal in the mid-fifteenth century during the reign of Rukunuddin Barbak Shah, settling in the country's capital, Gaur.

== Life ==
Shah Ismail Ghazi was born outside of Bengal. He settled in the city of Gaur. During this time Sultan Rukunuddin Barbak Shah was building a dam across the river Jhatiya-Bhatiya or Chutiaputia. All the engineers and craftsmen tried for long seven years but could not complete the dam. After hearing this Ismail approached the Sultan and suggested a scheme. After his solution proved successful, Ismail became one of the most important men in the Sultan's army, and many battles were won under his command.

== Military career ==
Shah Ismail Ghazi's first campaign was against the confronting Prataparudra Deva of the Gajapati dynasty on the south-western frontier. Initially he achieved some military success against the Gajapati dynasty in Orissa, where he constructed a fort. After defeat at the hands of Kameshwar, king of Kamatapur, Barbak Shah decided to send Shah Ismail. He was victorious; the king surrendered to the Sultan and converted to Islam.

== Death ==
There are two theories regarding the death of Shah Ismail Ghazi. One is that he was slain in a war in 1474. Another theory says that after so many victories Bhandsi Rai, the commandant of Ghoraghat, was jealous of him and reported to the Sultan that Shah Ismail Ghazi was in collusion with the Raja of Kamrup. After hearing this the Sultan immediately ordered Ismail's execution in 1474 A.D(878 A.H). There are six shrines dedicated to the memory of the saint; one at Mandaran (in Jhanabad, west of Hooghly), one at Ghoraghat, and four in Pirganj in the district of Rangpur, one of those being in Baradarga.
