= Mohammad Amin (politician) =

Bangladeshi politician

- মোহাম্মদ আমিন

Member of National Assembly of Pakistan

Member of Parliament for Rangpur-VI
- In office 1962–1965

Member of the Bangladesh Parliament for Rangpur-2
- In office 18 February 1979 – 31 May 1981
- Preceded by: Afsar Ali Ahmed
- Succeeded by: Anisul Haque Chowdhury

Personal details
- Born: 1930 (age 95–96) Chaoradangi, Jaldhaka thana, British India
- Party: Bangladesh Awami League

Mohammad Amin is a Bangladesh Awami League politician and a former member of parliament for Rangpur-2. He was a member of the 3rd National Assembly of Pakistan as a representative of East Pakistan.

== Biography ==
Mohammad Amin was born in 1930 in Chaoradangi village of what is now Jaldhaka Upazila, Nilphamari District, Bangladesh.

Amin was a member of the 3rd National Assembly of Pakistan representing Rangpur-VI. He was elected to parliament from Rangpur-2 as a Bangladesh Awami League candidate in 1979.
