= Kamal Uddin Haider =

Bangladeshi politician

- কামাল উদ্দিন হায়দার

Member of Parliament from Rangpur-2
- In office 1988–1990
- Preceded by: Anisul Haque Chowdhury
- Succeeded by: Hussain Muhammad Ershad

Personal details
- Party: Jatiya Party

Kamal Uddin Haider is a politician from the Rangpur District of Bangladesh and an elected member of parliament from Rangpur-2.

== Career ==
Haider was elected to parliament from Rangpur-2 as an independent candidate in 1988.
