= Ahsanul Hoque Chowdhury =

Bangladeshi politician

- আহ্সানুল হক চৌধুরি

Member of the Bangladesh Parliament for Rangpur-2
- In office 29 January 2014 – 6 August 2024
- Preceded by: Anisul Islam Mondal
- Succeeded by: A. T. M. Azharul Islam

Personal details
- Born: 6 October 1968 (age 57)
- Party: Bangladesh Awami League

Abul Kalam Md. Ahsanul Haque Chowdhury (born 6 October 1968) is a Bangladesh Awami League politician and a former Jatiya Sangsad member representing the Rangpur-2 constituency during 2014–2024.

== Early life ==
Chowdhury was born on 6 October 1968. He has a B.A., M.A., and LLB.

== Career ==
Chowdhury was elected to parliament from Rangpur-2 on 5 January 2014 as a Bangladesh Awami League candidate. Local Awami League leaders in Rangpur District accused him of monopolizing power and controlling local politics in December 2017. In February 2017, he was warned by the speaker for using expletives in parliament against Muhammad Yunus, founder of Grameen Bank. He is a member of the Parliamentary Standing Committee on the Ministry of Industry.
