= Damodarpur Union, Badarganj =

Union of Badarganj Upazila of Rangpur District, Bangladesh

Damodarpur Union দামোদরপুর ইউনিয়ন
- Union council
- No. 25 Damodarpur Union Parishad
- Location within Rangpur division Location within Bangladesh
- Coordinates: 25°42′24″N 89°02′23″E
- Country: Bangladesh
- Division: Rangpur
- District: Rangpur
- Upazila: Badarganj

Area
  - Total: 32.58 km^{2} (12.58 sq mi)
- Elevation: 34 m (112 ft)

Population (2011)
  - Total: 28,310
  - Density: 868.9/km^{2} (2,251/sq mi)
- Time zone: UTC+6 (BST)
- Postal code: 5430

Damodarpur Union (Bengali: দামোদরপুর ইউনিয়ন) is a union parishad under Badarganj Upazila, Rangpur District, Rangpur Division, Bangladesh. It covers an area of 32.58 squared kilometres, and had a population of 22,547 as of the 2011 census. There are a total of 8 villages within the union.

== Demographics ==
According to the 2011 census, Damodarpur Union has a total of 6,950 households and 28,310 inhabitants. Out of its population, 14,252 are male and 14,058 are female. The literacy rate is 35.3%, with the male literacy rate being 36.6% and female literacy rate being 34%.

== Administrative divisions ==
As of the year 2011, Damodarpur has 8 subdivisions. They are listed as follows:

Village	Population (2011)
Amrulbari	6,590
Chak Palashbari	1,157
Gopalpur	2,822
Uttar Gopalpur	3,039
Jamalpur	893
Mostafapur	4,033
Sahapur	2,103
Taluk Damodarpur	7,673

== See also ==
- Badarganj Upazila
- Rangpur District
