= Pirganj Upazila, Rangpur =

Upazila in Rangpur District, Bangladesh

Pirganj Upazila পীরগঞ্জ উপজেলা
- Upazila of Bangladesh
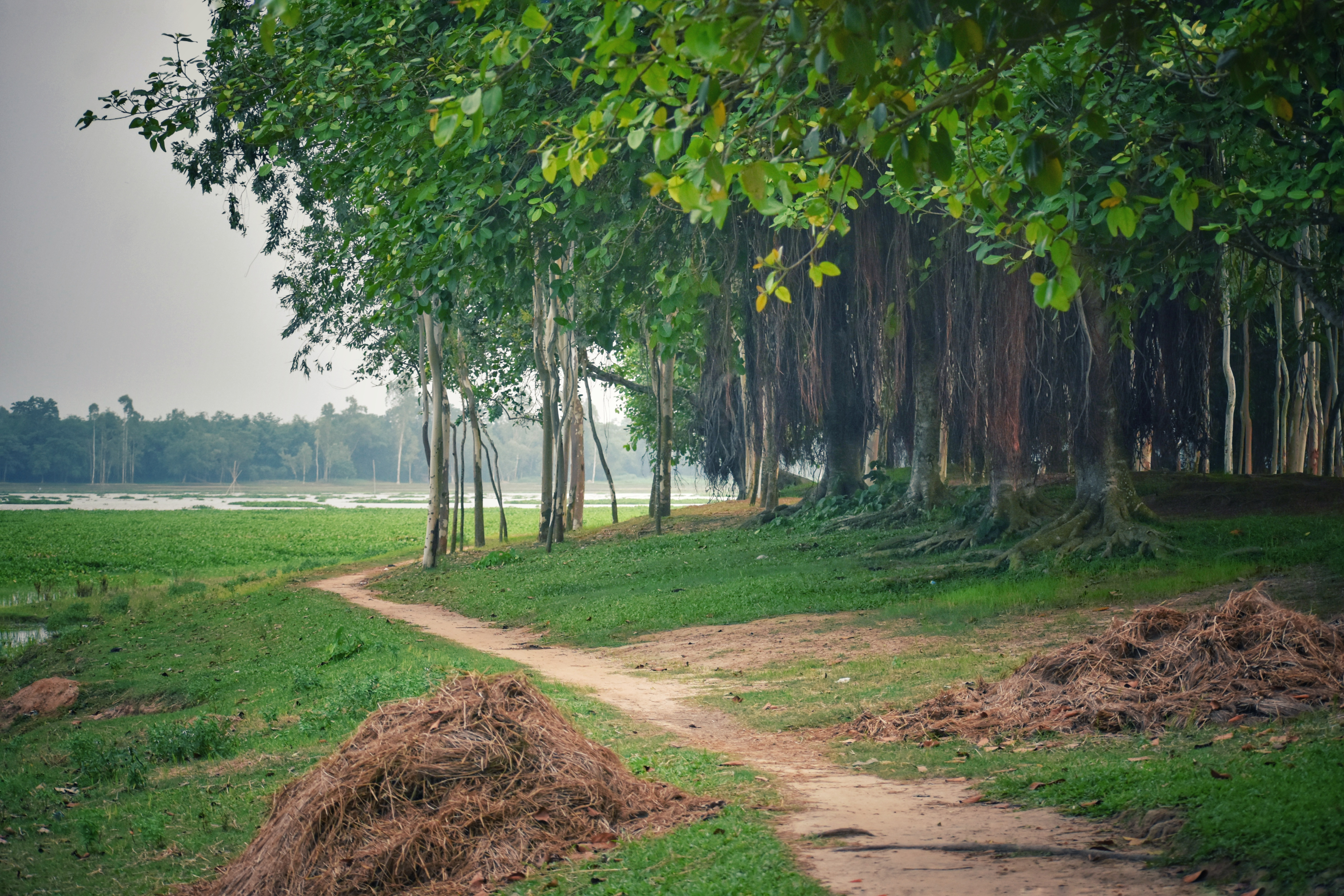
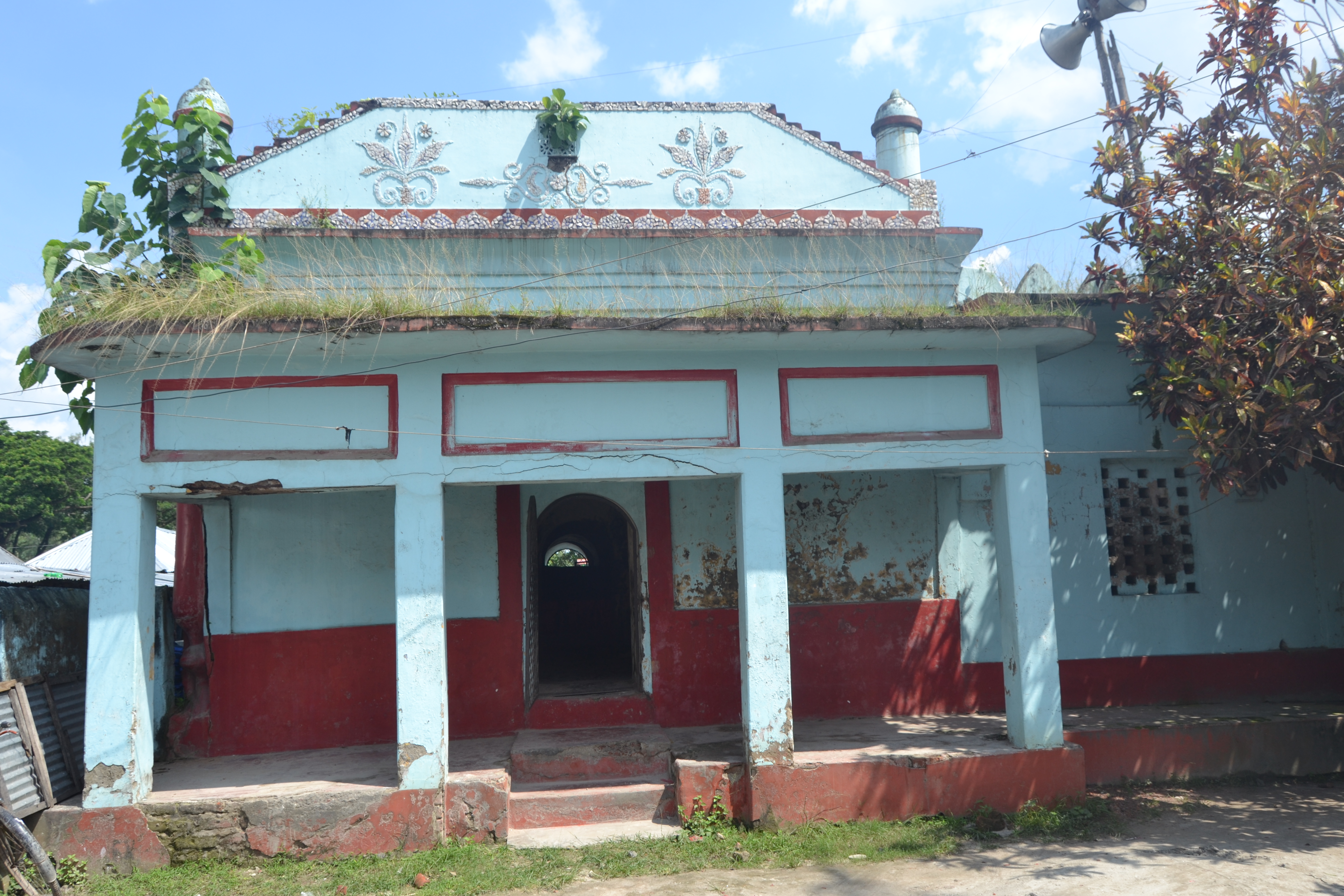
- Boro Bil Dargah of Shah Ismail Ghazi

- Coordinates: 25°24.9′N 89°19′E
- Country: Bangladesh
- Division: Rangpur
- District: Rangpur

Government
  - Chief Executive Officer: Khadija Begum

Area
  - Total: 411.35 km^{2} (158.82 sq mi)

Population (2022)
  - Total: 414,845
  - Density: 1,008.5/km^{2} (2,612.0/sq mi)
- Time zone: UTC+6 (BST)
- Postal code: 5470
- Area code: 05227
- Website: pirgonj.rangpur.gov.bd

Pirganj Upazila (Bengali: পীরগঞ্জ উপজেলা) is an upazila of Rangpur District in the division of Rangpur, Bangladesh. Pirganj Upazila area 411.35 km^{2}, located in between 25°18' and 25°31' north latitudes and in between 89°08' and 89°25' east longitudes. It is bounded by Mithapukur Upazila on the north, Palashbari Upazila on the south, Ghoraghat Upazila and Nawabganj Upazila on the west, Sadullapur Upazila on the east.

Administration Pirganj Thana, now an upazila, was formed in 1910.

== Epigrammatic history ==
History of Pirganj mainly focused at the period of Bengal Sultanate.

Rangpur along with Pirganj was a part of Kamrup. After Bakhtiyar Khalji failed to capture this part of the kamrup and died (1206 AD-1210 AD) Sultan Giash Uddin tried to capture Kamrup in 1227 AD and failed. Tughrel Kha primarily captured this area but in the long run he failed to continue his control. At last Shah Ismail Ghazi Captain of thirteenth Gour's Pathanian Sultan Rukunnuddin Abul Mujahid Barbak Shah was able to capture Kamrup. Shah Ismail Ghazi was a Muslims religious leader, captain and Muslim missionary. The king of Ghoraghat Bhandari Roy was envious with his success and started to conspiracy against him and be able to convince Sultan Rukunnuddin Abul Mujahid Barbak Shah to send soldier against him. He was arrested and killed on 8 January 1474 AD (14th Saban, 878 Hizri) and his head was brought to king. Later Sultan Rukunnuddin Abul Mujahid Barbak Shah be able to know about the conspiracy of Bhandari Roy and became repentant. Repentant king buried the head of Shah Ismail Ghazi at Bagduar of pirganj with due respect. His follower's were already buried his headless body in Mandaron under Hugli district. A small island in the Barabila near Pirganj unzila headquarter is memorable for Shah Ismail Gazi. There was a mosque in this island prepared by his followers but now this mosque is fully destroyed. Mosque (30F X 20F X 15F) and the large well at Baradargah under Pirganj Upazila was one of the most memorable place for Shah Ismail Ghazi. Most of the historian believes that his journey for victory and missionary was started from this place and the Introstick (Dikshadanda) is buried in this place. Some historian believes that his part of body was also buried in this place. Some historians believe that part of his body is also buried at Ghoraghat Upazila, Dinajpur.

The history of Pirganj is mostly related with the victory of Shah Ismail Gazi. At the time of his victory against King Nilambbar, Kamrup was joined with the Independent Bangla permanently. At the time of Hussain Shah Pirganj was introduced as an administrative centre and Barabila area was introduced as Land Revenue Pargana (an administrative unit). Up to Battle of Palashi these units were remain unmoved. From the British period there are some changes done within these administrative units but no remarkable change was done till today.

== Geography ==
Pirganj is located at 25.4153°N 89.3167°E. It is the southernmost upazila of Rangpur district. It is surrounded by Mithapukur upazila of Rangpur to the North, Sadullapur Upazila of Gaibndha to the east, Palashbari Upazila to the south and Ghoraghat and Nawabganj upazilas of Dinajpur to the west. It has a total area of 411.34 km^{2}.

Water bodies the main river: Karatoya, Jamuneshwari, Akhira; Pirganj is called the upazila of beel.

== Demographics ==
Religions in Pirganj Upazila (2022)
Religion	Percent
Islam	92.41%
Hinduism	6.58%
Christianity	0.71%
Other or not stated	0.30%

According to the 2022 Bangladeshi census, Pirganj Upazila had 114,097 households and a population of 414,845. 9.36% of the population were under 5 years of age. Pirganj had a literacy rate (age 7 and over) of 67.11%: 69.79% for males and 64.55% for females, and a sex ratio of 96.46 males for every 100 females. 35,056 (8.45%) lived in urban areas. Ethnic population was 4336 (1.05%) of which Oraon were 2353 and Santal were 1817.

According to the 2011 Census of Bangladesh, Pirganj Upazila had 101,640 households and a population of 385,499. 89,356 (23.18%) were under 10 years of age. Pirganj had a literacy rate (age 7 and over) of 45.36%, compared to the national average of 51.8%, and a sex ratio of 1008 females per 1000 males. 14,993 (3.89%) lived in urban areas. Ethnic population was 5,716 (1.48%), of which Oraon were 2,646 and Santal 1,944.

As of the 1991 Bangladesh census, Pirganj had a population of 303384. Males constitute 50.72% of the population, and females 49.28%. This Upazila's eighteen up population is 154333. Pirganj has an average literacy rate of 26.5% (7+ years), and the national average of 32.4% literate.

== Economy ==
Agriculture is the predominant economic activity in Pirganj. In addition to rice, the main crop, many vegetables and bananas are produced in Pirganj. Local traders as well as traders from Dhaka, Chittagong and other parts of the country purchase the surplus agricultural products from the area and sell them to major urban centres in the country. Fishing is also a major economic activity in the area. Karotoa, a large river, which flows through the western border of the upazila is known for its variety of fish. There are numerous lakes (known as beel locally) and couple of small rivers in Pirganj.

Major commercial centers are Pirganj, Chatra, Balua, Khalashpir, Vendabari, Motherganjhat is big commercial area and Shanerhat. There are branches of Islami Bank, Standard Bank, Janata Bank, Rashahi Krishi Unnayan Bank in Pirganj, Sonali Bank in Pirganj Chatra and Khalashpir. There are also branches of Rupali Bank in Vendabari, Agrani Bank in Shanerhat and Janata Bank in Motherganj.

=== Natural resources ===
Pirganj is endowed with one of the largest coal discoveries in Bangladesh. The coal deposit is located at a low depth near Khalashpir.

== Arts and culture ==
Several cultural organizations and theater groups based in Pirganj proper. An annual fair, known as mela locally, takes place in Baradargah in the Islamic month of Muharram. Annual fairs also take place in few other locations during winter or on the eve of Bengali new year. Sharadiya Durga puja is celebrated in Pirganj, Chatra and few other localities.

Islam is the predominant religion in Pirganj, with over 90% of its people belonging to the faith. There is a significant Hindu population scattered over the Upazila. Concentration of Hindu population is high in Panchgachi Union. There is an indigenous Oraon population in Chaitrakul union and a Santal population in Chatra union.

A cultural organization named Angon is located in the village Boger Bari in Kumedpur union. They arrange various seasonal programs such as cultural activities and sports competitions. A student-based social organization named Concerned Peoples Organization (CPO) is located in the village of Gurzipara in Baradargah union, which arranges social programs to concern people of its area.

== Points of interest ==
The major tourist attractions in Pirganj are : Baro Bila (a large lake), Nil Daria (an area surrounded by a lake), Altab Nagar Masjid (a big historical mosque), Kadirabad forest (a large forest created by Bangladesh Forest Department), Hatibanda (Dareapur) Mosque (an old mosque), Khalashpir Mosque, Anandonagar amusement park near Khalashpir and Raipur Jomidar Bari and Horin Shingher Dighi (a big pond) and Gorr (a part of Brobila). There are remnants of the palace of King Nilambor in Patgram. The shrine of Kazi Kabi Heyat Mamud is located in Jharbishla near Vendabari.

== Administration ==
UNO: Khadija Begum

Pirganj Upazila is divided into Pirganj Municipality and 15 union parishads: Bhendabari, Boro Alampur, Borodargah, Chaitrakul, Chatra, Kabilpur, Kumedpur, Madankhali, Mithapur, Pachgachi, Pirganj, Raypur, Ramnathpur, Shanerhat, and Tukuria. The union parishads are subdivided into 308 mauzas and 332 villages.

Pirganj is one of the three constituencies from which Sheikh Hasina was elected as an MP in the ninth parliamentary election of the country in 2008. She was also elected in the tenth parliamentary election in 2014 from the same constituency. Later in the by-election, Shirin Sharmin Chowdhury, the former speaker of Bangladesh parliament was elected unopposed from the constituency.

== Transport ==
One can travel from Dhaka to Pirganj by bus. Rangpur-bound buses run from Kallyanpur in Dhaka to Pirganj bus station. It takes about six hours. Pirganj is about 60 kilometers towards to the north from Bogra. It is on the way from Bogra to Rangpur (the distance from Bogra to Rangpur is about 100 kilometers). The nearest airport is at Saidpur, Nilphamari. Communication from Rangpur town is very easy. It takes about 40 minutes by bus.

There have been some improvements in road communication within Pirganj Upazila in the recent years. All major commercial centers are connected by pacca roads. From Dhaperhat, a circular route covers Chatra, Khalashpir, Vendabari, Baro Dargah, Shanerhat and Motherganj and come back to Dhaperhat.

A bridge name Wazed Mia Bridge on the river Karotoya River near Kanchdah ghat in Pirganj has been opened recently. The bridge has made the communication between Rangpur and Dinajpur districts much easier.

== Education ==
Colleges

- Pirganj College
- Government Shah Abdur Rouf College
- Chatra Degree College
- Chatra Karigori College
- Chatra Women's College
- Gurzipara College
- K J Islam girls school and college
- Kadirabad Women's College
- Khalashpir Bangobondhu Degree College
- Mohiosi Begum Rokeya Mohila College, Gurzipara
- Monikrishan Sen College, Bishnupur
- Motherganj College
- Pirganj Karigori College
- Pirganj Mohila College
- Rasulpur School & College
- Sirajuddin Technical & Business Management College
- Vendabari Women's College
- Amodpur Mahavidyalaya

Textile Engineering College (BSc)

- Dr. M A Wazed Miah Textile Engineering College.

High schools

- Abdullahpur Jahan Mhamud High School
- Akota Bajar High School
- Bishnupur Beni Madhab Sen High School
- Chak Karim High School
- Chander Bazer High School
- Chatra Girls High School
- Chatra High School
- Doshmouza High school
- Eklimpur High school
- Gilabari High School
- Gurzipara K.P. High School, Gurzipara
- Haripur High School
- Hazi Boyan Uddin High School
- Hitabanda KMT High School
- Jafor Para High School
- Jahangirabad High School
- Kadirabad High School
- Kanchon Bajar High School
- Khataber Para PMA High School
- Khedmotpur High School
- Kumedpur High School
- Laldighi Girls Academy
- Laldighi High School
- Laldighi mela Adhorso High School
- Maderganj High School
- Nildorea High School
- Panbazer High School
- Patnichara High School
- Pirganj Bangobandhu high School
- Pirganj Government High School
- Pirganj Kasimonnessa Girls High School
- Raipur High School
- Rasulpur High school
- Shanerhat High school
- Sheikh Hasina Adarsha Girl's High School
- Vendabari High School
- Vimshahar High School

Madrasahs

- Boro Dargah Hazrat Shah Ismail Gazi (R) Fazil Madrasha
- Chatrahat Alim Madrasah
- Dhorakandor Dakhil Madrasha,
- Duramithipur Darus Sunnat Dhakil Madrasha
- Gurzipara Dakhil Madrasha,
- Haripur Senior Alim Madrasha
- Jafar Para Kamil Madrasha
- Jamtola Madinatul Ulum Madrasa
- Khalashpir Senior Fazil Madrasha
- kholahati dakhil madrasha
- Kumedpur Madrasha
- Maderganj Fazil Madrasha
- Patnichara Girls Dakhil Madrasha
- Pirganj Senior Fazil Madrasha
- Radhakrisna pur Nezamia Dhakhil Madrasha
- shahapur madrasha
- Shaner hat Islamia Dakhil Madrasha
- Sharolia T.M Fazil Madrasha

== Notable people ==
- Shah Ismail Ghazi (died 1474), military general and preacher
- Qazi Heyat Mahmud (1693–1760), judge, mystic and poet
- Khan Bahadur Maulvi Shah Abdur Rauf (1889-1969), politician and author
- Matiur Rahman (1933-2003), politician
- Abul Kalam Azad (born 1950), politician
- Nur Mohammad Mondal, politician
- Abdul Jalil Pradhan, politician
- Abu Sayed (1999-2024), student activist
- Wazed family of Fatehpur Miah Bari
  - Muhammad Abdul Wazed Miah (1942–2009), nuclear scientist and husband of Prime Minister Sheikh Hasina.
  - Sajeeb Wazed Joy (born 1971), businessman and politician
  - Saima Wazed Putul (born 1972), psychologist

== See also ==
- Upazilas of Bangladesh
- Districts of Bangladesh
- Divisions of Bangladesh
