= Shah Abdur Rauf =

Khan Bahadur Shah Abdur Rauf
- শাহ্‌ আব্দুর রঊফ

Member of the Bengal Legislative Assembly
- In office 1937–1945
- Succeeded by: Emad Uddin Ahammad
- Constituency: Rangpur South

Member of the Bengal Legislative Council
- In office 1920–1923
- Constituency: Rangpur West

Vice-Chairman of the Rangpur District Board
- In office 1922–1931

Personal details
- Born: 1889 Muqimpur, Pirganj, Rangpur District, Bengal Presidency
- Died: January 1, 1969 (aged 79–80) Muqimpur
- Party: Bengal Provincial Muslim League
- Education: Aligarh Muslim University

Khan Bahadur Shah Abdur Rauf CIE (Bengali: শাহ্‌ আব্দুর রঊফ; 1889 - 1 January 1969) was a Bengali littérateur, lawyer and politician. He was an All-India Muslim League leader and a member of the Bengal Legislative Council.

== Early life and education ==
Abdur Rauf was born in 1889 to a Bengali literary family of Muslim pirs in the village of Muqimpur in Pirganj, Rangpur district, Bengal Presidency (now Bangladesh). He was the son of Shah Kalimuddin Ahmed, a notable author of puthis.

He received his primary and secondary education in Rangpur. After that, he went to Aligarh Muslim University in India for higher education. From Aligarh, he first obtained a Bachelor of Arts and later a Bachelor of Laws degree.

== Career ==
The Rayat movement started in Rangpur district in 1919. The Rayats and common people of Rangpur were oppressed and oppressed by the ruthless exploitation of the landlords. He was the secretary of the Rayat Samiti formed in Rangpur district. The Rayat movement gained momentum under his leadership.

He was elected to the Bengal Legislative Council after the 1920 elections, representing the Rangpur West (Sadar-Nilphamari) constituency. In 1922, Abdur Rauf was also elected as a member of the Rangpur District Board and in October 1933, he became its vice-chairman. In 1940, Abdur Rauf was appointed as a public prosecutor. He served nine years in this position.

His third job was at Rangpur Central Cooperative Bank. Abdur Rauf was the Honorary Secretary of the bank. He was then elected as the Deputy Chairman of the bank. In recognition of his public service through the cooperative movement, Abdur Rauf received the Jubilee Medal and the Jubilee Cooperative Certificate in 1935. Abdur Rauf contested in the 1937 Bengal legislative elections, winning in the Rangpur South constituency. He received the Coronation Medal from the erstwhile Bara Lat Bahadur in 1937 for his philanthropic work, and in 1939 he was awarded the title of Khan Bahadur and CIE by the British Raj.

Abdur Rauf played a significant role in establishing primary schools in Rangpur. He played an important role as a senior leader of the Rangpur District Muslim League. Shortly after the Partition of Bengal in 1947, he was elected president of the Rangpur District School Board. He served in this position until 1953.

He was elected a member of the Rajshahi Divisional Council by the Pakistan government in 1960. He was a candidate for the 'Basic Democracy' of Ayub Khan. The Government of Pakistan awarded him the Tamgha-e-Quaid-e-Azam in 1960.

== Literary career ==
Abdur Rauf belonged to a literary family. He did not limit his versatile talents to politics, social service, and the promotion and spread of education. He himself was engaged in literary pursuits and he patronized literary pursuits. A poem by him titled "Choturdoshi" (June 1967) and a two-volume prose collection titled "Amar Kormojibon" (My Career) were written by him. The two books "Barkat-e-Noor" and "Naat-e-Rasool Maqbool" written by Hazrat Maulana Shah Aftabuzzaman Pir Sahib were published with his financial support.

== Death ==
Abdur Rauf died on 1 January 1969 at his residence in the Litchi Garden (Salek Pump) area of Rangpur city. He was buried in the area adjacent to the Barkatiyyah Darbar Sharif of Dhola Pir Saheb at the Alamnagar-Panama junction on Station Road.

The Shah Abdur Rauf College in Pirganj was named after him and established in 1970. It became a governmental college in 2018.
