= Afsar Ali Ahmed =

Bangladeshi politician (1920–2015)

- আফসার আলী আহমেদ

Member of Bangladesh Parliament

Member of Parliament for Rangpur-2
- In office 1973–1979
- Preceded by: Constituency initiated
- Succeeded by: Mohammad Amin

Personal details
- Party: Awami League

Afsar Ali Ahmed (1920–2015) was an Awami League politician in Bangladesh and a member of parliament for Rangpur-2.

== Career ==
Ahmed was a founding member of the Awami League and a confidant of Sheikh Mujibur Rahman.

In 1970, Ahmed was elected to the National Assembly of Pakistan in the 1970 general election.

Ahmed was a member of the Constituent Assembly of Bangladesh.

Ahmed was elected to parliament from Rangpur-2 as an Awami League candidate in 1973. He played an important role in the establishment of Nilphamari Women's College. He went into hiding after the assassination of Sheikh Mujibur Rahman in the 15 August 1975 Bangladeshi coup d'état and the military administration sought to take action against him.

Ahmed was the president of Nilphamari District unit of the Awami League for 34 years. He was a member of the Nilphamari District Lawyers' Association.

== Death ==
Ahmed died 20 April 2015 in Rangpur Medical College Hospital.
