= Heyat Mahmud =

Bengali poet

Qadi Heyat Mahmud
- Born: 1693; Jharbishila, Bengal Subah, Mughal Empire
- Died: 1760 (aged 66–67); Jharbishila
- Other name: Heyat Mamud
- Occupations: Poet, judge
- Notable work: see below
- Parents: Dewan Shah Kabir (father); Khairunnesa (mother)

Qadi Heyat Mahmud (Bengali: হেয়াত মামুদ (Note: Also spelt হেয়াত মাহমুদ); 1693–1760) was a medieval Bengali poet, mystic and judge. Although his works, like other Middle Bengali poetry, are religion-centric, they are marked by social consciousness and tolerance. Mahmud is considered to be the last poet of Middle Bengali literature, and his lifespan directly ends shortly after the British East India Company's victory at the Battle of Plassey.

== Early life and career ==
Mahmud was born in 1693, to a Bengali Muslim family in the village of Jharbishila then part of the Sarkar Ghoraghat of Bengal Subah, Mughal Empire (now in Pirganj, Rangpur District, Bangladesh). His father, Shah Kabir, was the Dewan of Ghoraghat and a poet in his spare time. His mother's name was Khairunnesa. Due to this, Mahmud was able to be employed by the Sarkar as a Qadi (Muslim judge).

== Literary career ==
Mahmud has written four poetry compositions. As a resident of Ghoraghat, his works have strong influence from the Persian-influenced Dobhashi register of Middle Bengali. His earliest found book, titled Jangnāmā (1723), narrates the Battle of Karbala in zari style. In 1732, he wrote Sarbabhedbāṇī which contains proverbial statements. He collected the material from Mafrehul Qulub, a Persian translation of the Panchatantra. Shabnam Begum refers to the book as Chittya-Uththan and claims that it was a Persian translation of the Hitopadesha. Hitaggyānbāṇī was composed in 1753, and explores Islamic ethics. Mahmud's magnum opus Āmbiyābāṇī (1758) covers the Stories of The Prophets from Adam to Muhammad.

== Death and legacy ==
Mahmud died on 17 February, presumably in the year 1760. He was buried in a mazar (mausoleum) in his home village, Jharbishila. Every year since then, his urs is commemorated by the locals. His works became known to the mainstream through the efforts of Maulvi Mansuruddin.

A memorial center has been set up at the initiative of the Dinajpur District Council. In Mahmud's honour, a building of the Begum Rokeya University was named Kabi Heyat Mahmud Bhaban.
