= Shirin Sharmin Chaudhury =

Bangladeshi politician (born 1966)

- শিরীন শারমিন চৌধুরী
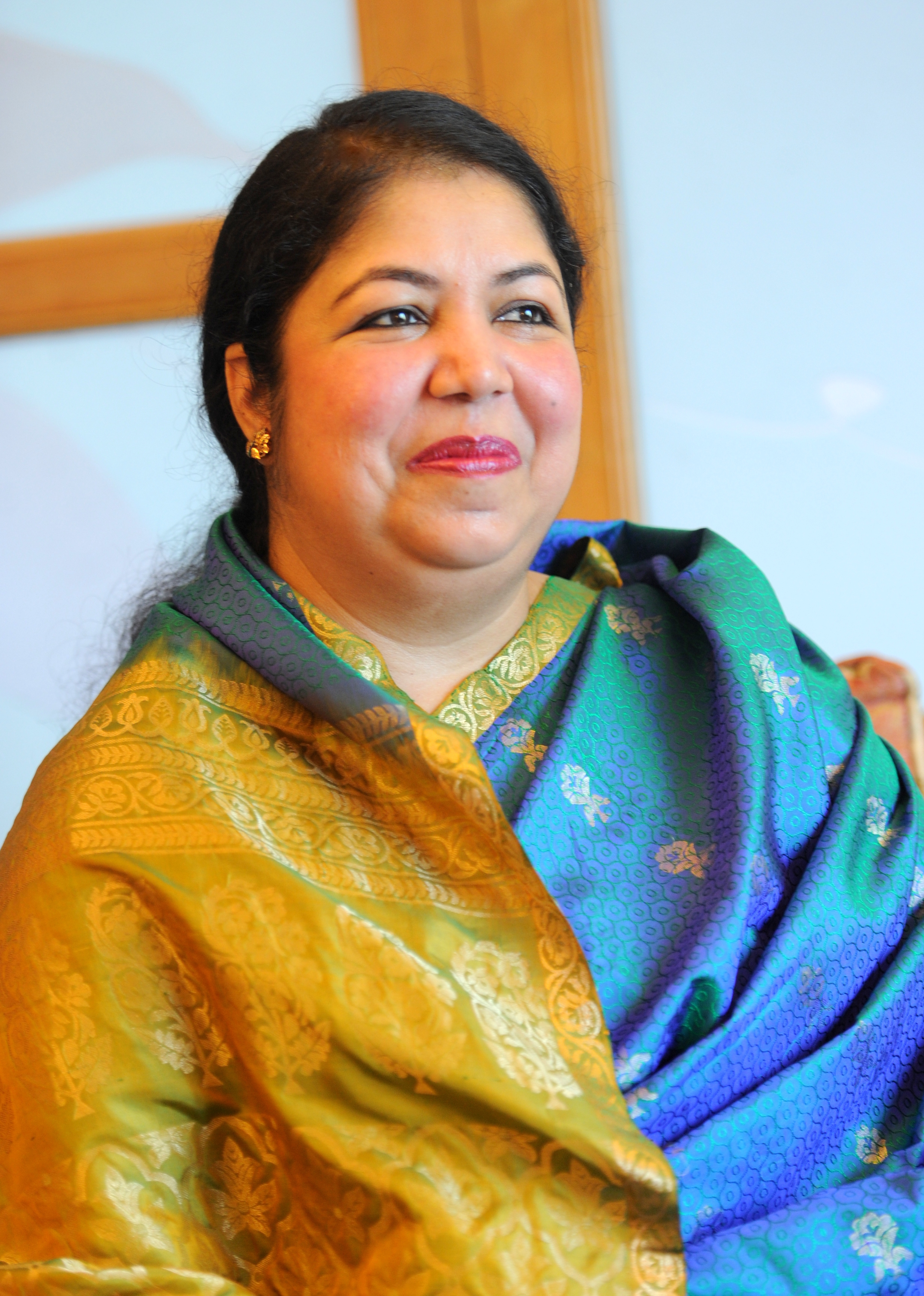
- Chaudhury in 2012

12th Speaker of the Jatiya Sangsad
- In office 30 April 2013 – 2 September 2024 (Note: While Parliament was dissolved on 6 August 2024, Article 74(3) of the Constitution of Bangladesh allows the Speaker to remain in office until a successor is elected. Thus, Her tenure officially ended with her resignation on 2 September 2024.)
- Deputy: Shawkat Ali; Fazle Rabbi Miah; Shamsul Hoque Tuku
- Preceded by: Shawkat Ali (acting)
- Succeeded by: Hafizuddin Ahmad

Member of Parliament
- In office 29 January 2014 – 6 August 2024
- Preceded by: Abul Kalam Azad
- Succeeded by: Md Nurul Amin
- Constituency: Rangpur-6
- In office 25 January 2009 – 24 January 2014
- Preceded by: Dr. Ameena Begum
- Succeeded by: Waseqa Ayesha Khan
- Constituency: Reserved Women's Seat-31

Chair of the Commonwealth Parliamentary Association
- In office October 2014 – November 2017
- Preceded by: Alan Haselhurst
- Succeeded by: Emilia Monjowa Lifaka

Minister of State for Women and Children Affairs
- In office 6 January 2009 – 30 April 2013
- Prime Minister: Sheikh Hasina
- Preceded by: Rasheda K Chowdhury
- Succeeded by: Meher Afroz Chumki

Personal details
- Born: 6 October 1966 (age 60) Noakhali, East Pakistan, Pakistan
- Party: Bangladesh Awami League
- Spouse: Syed Ishtiaque Hossain
- Children: 2
- Education: University of Dhaka; University of Essex

Shirin Sharmin Chaudhury (born 6 October 1966) is a Bangladeshi politician who served as the first female Speaker of the Bangladesh Jatiya Sangsad since April 2013 until September 2024. At 46, she became the youngest person to assume that office. She was also the chairperson of the Executive Committee of the Commonwealth Parliamentary Association between 2014 and 2017. She previously served as the State minister of the Ministry of Women and Children Affairs of Bangladesh.

== Early life ==
Chaudhury was born on 6 October 1966 in Chatkhil thana of Noakhali, Bangladesh. Her father, Rafiqullah Chaudhury, was a Civil Service of Pakistan officer and secretary to the Prime Minister Sheikh Mujibur Rahman in 1972. Her mother, Naiyar Sultana, was a member of the Bangladesh Public Service Commission and the principal of Dhaka College.

== Education ==
Chaudhury passed her Secondary School Certificate and Higher Secondary School Certificate exams in 1983 and 1985 respectively from Holy Cross Girls' High School and College. To study law, she joined University of Dhaka and earned her LLB and LLM degrees in 1989 and 1990 respectively. She received a Commonwealth scholarship to study at the University of Essex in the UK. In 2000, Chaudhury earned her PhD degree in constitutional law and human rights.

On 16 July 2014, Chaudhury received an honorary PhD degree from the University of Essex.

== Career ==
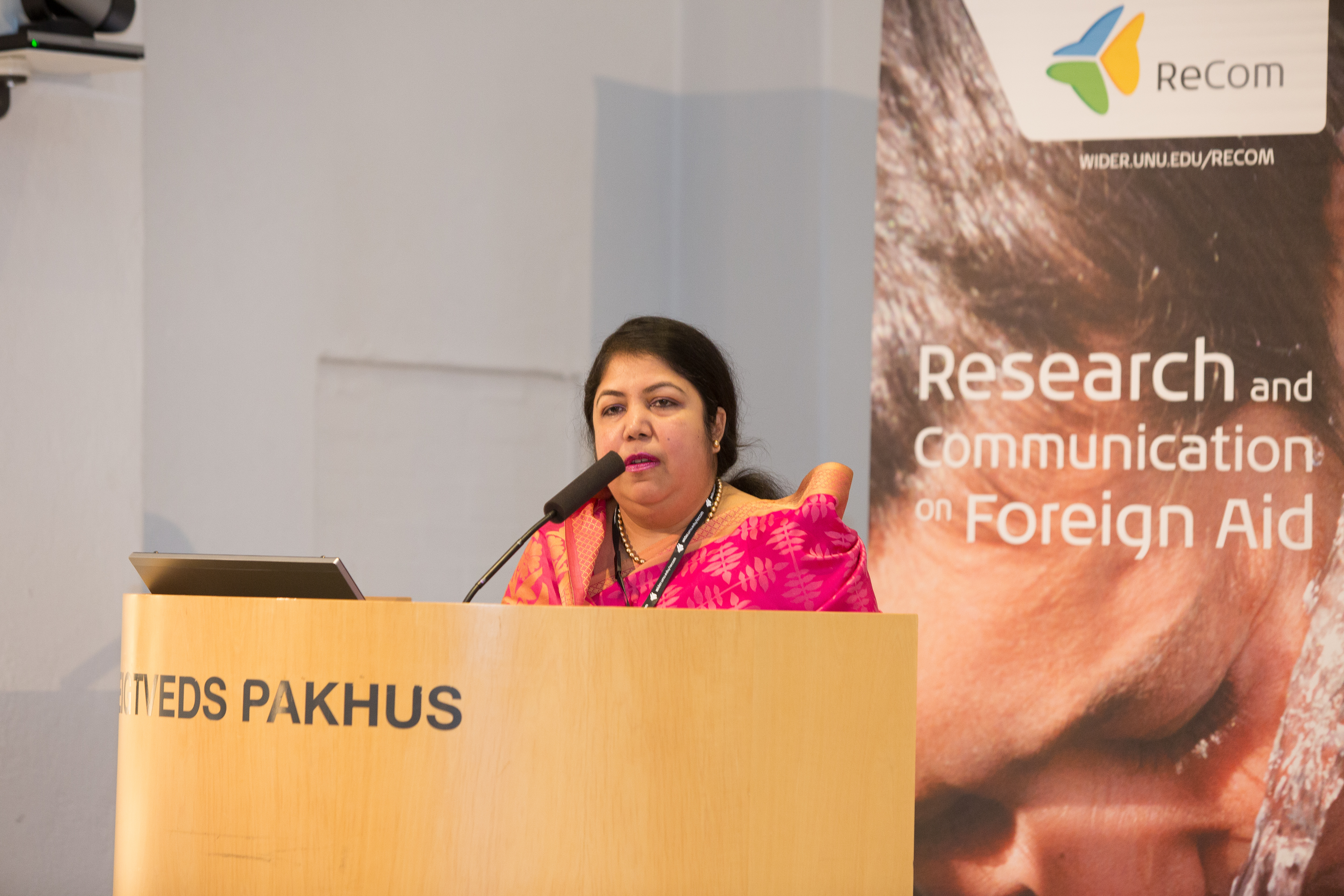
Chaudhury in Aid for Gender Equality, 2013

Chaudhury, the International Affairs Secretary of the Awami League, was elected MP from one of the parliamentary seats reserved for women on 24 March 2009 and was state minister of the Ministry of Women and Children Affairs (Bangladesh) until her nomination for speaker of Jatiya Sangsad in April 2013.

Chaudhury was awarded Asia Society's Humanitarian Service Award on 9 June 2010 in recognition of her role as a leader in advocating the elimination of violence against women and mainstreaming women's empowerment and employment in Bangladesh. Shey received this award from Ambassador Melanne Verveer, then US Ambassador-at-Large, Global Women Issues in a gala award ceremony at the Ritz Carlton Hotel in Washington DC.

On 28 January 2014, Chaudhury was elected MP from the Rangpur-6 constituency that had been vacated by the prime minister, Sheikh Hasina after the 5 January elections. Chaudhury was uncontested in the by-elections and was nominated for speaker by the Awami League the same day. She took oath as the speaker of the 10th Parliament on 29 January 2014, becoming the first person to remain speaker across two consecutive tenures.

Chaudhury was elected chairperson of the Commonwealth Parliamentary Association (CPA) for the next three years in the CPA elections held in the Cameroonian capital of Yaounde on 9 October 2014. She was the first Bangladeshi to hold that position, as well as any position in an international forum of this level. Bangladesh has been a member of the CPA Asia region, the biggest parliamentary forum of the world, since 1973. It competed for the post of CPA chairperson for the first time in 2014.

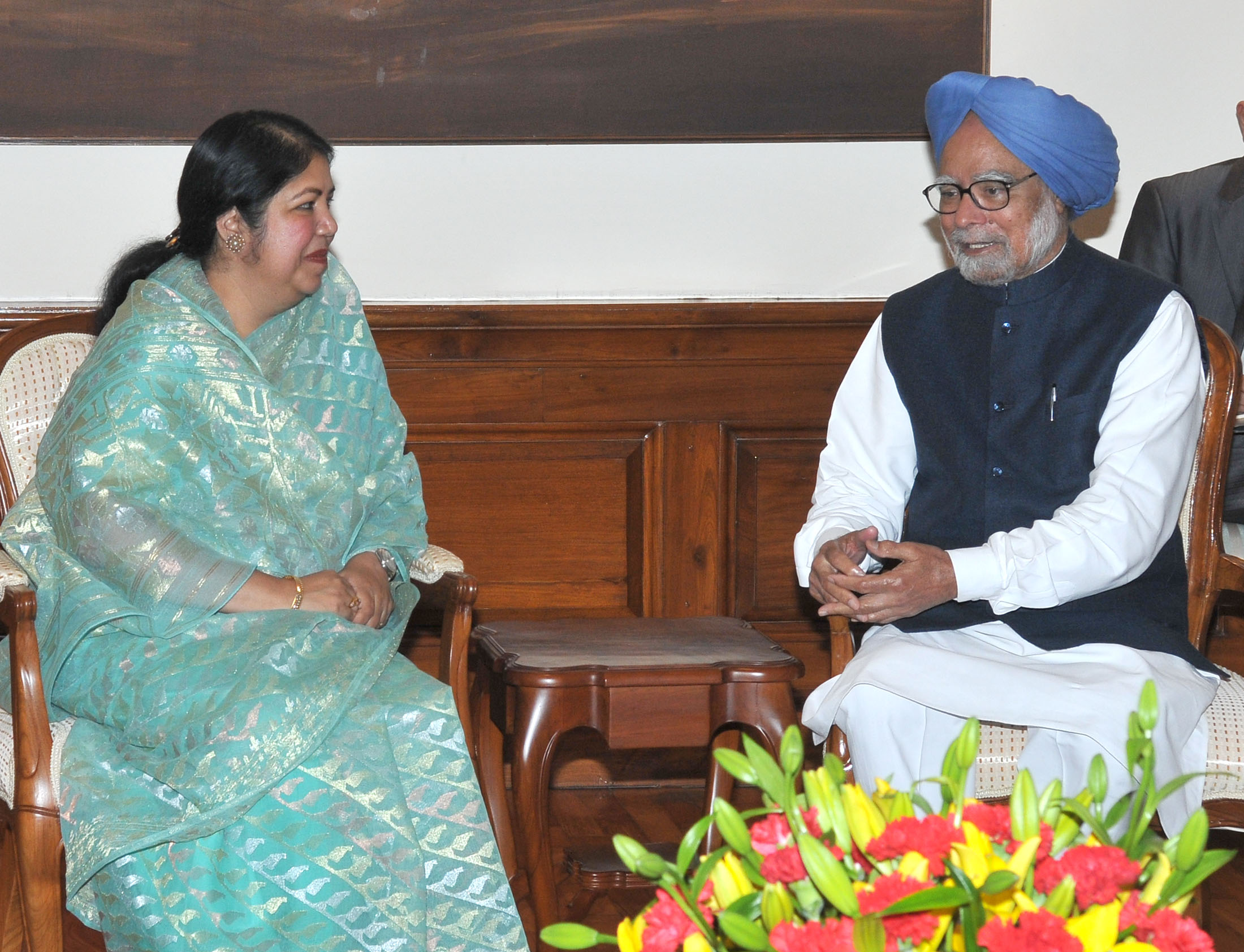
Chaudhury with Indian Prime minister Manmohan Singh in 2014

In her role as CPA chairperson between 2014 and 2017, Chaudhury has both attended and presided over a number of landmark events. On 9 March 2015, she addressed an audience including Queen Elizabeth II, members of the royal family and British and Commonwealth dignitaries at an Observance for Commonwealth Day at Westminster Abbey in London, UK. She also opened the 46th Commonwealth Parliamentary Association Africa Region Conference held in Nairobi, Africa between 10 and 13 August 2015. Chaudhury participated as a panel speaker in the "Tackling inequality, empowering women and girls and leaving no one behind" interactive dialogue session at the Sustainable Development Goals Summit held in New York 25 September 2015. As speaker of the Bangladesh Parliament, she has participated in a number of successful bilaterals, most notably with Indian and Chinese officials, including the Indian prime minister, president and speaker, the Chinese president, vice president and chairman of the National People's Congress.

Chaudhury has also been honoured with a Women Leadership Achievement Award at the 2nd World Women Leadership Congress and Award (WWLCA) 2015. Addressing a seminar "Connecting Minds, Creating the Future", Dr Chaudhury called for integrating women in the mainstream of development. She said the women community and all others would have to work together to face the challenges on the way of establishing women leadership across the world. Along with the government, all non-government and corporate agencies would have to work together to establish gender parity in society.

Chaudhury was a practising advocate of the Bangladesh Supreme Court and was one of the members of the lawyers' panel to conduct the cases filed against Sheikh Hasina during the army-backed caretaker government in 2007–08. Her key areas of work include human rights, constitutional law, gender issues and judicial reviews by way of writs. She is a Resource Person for several institutions including University of Dhaka, BRAC University, Dhaka International University and Bangladesh Institute of Law and International Affairs.

On 6 April 2026, Chaudhury was arrested by the Detective Branch of the Dhaka Metropolitan Police after a period in hiding. She was detained in connection with a case filed at Lalbagh Police Station regarding violence during the 2024 student-led uprising and is reportedly named in multiple other cases.

== Personal life ==
Chaudhury is married to Syed Ishtiaque Hossain, a pharmaceutical consultant. She has a daughter and a son.

== Publications ==
Chaudhury served as editor of Bangladesh Legal Decisions (BLD), Law Report Series published every month by the Bangladesh Bar Council from 2003 to 2008. She developed several dialogue and concept papers with various relevant non-governmental and human rights organizations on human rights issues. Her published articles include:

- "Role of the Judiciary in the Development of Human Rights", published in 1999, published by Ain O Salish Kendro
- "The Least Dangerous Branch and the Power of Judicial Review: Impact on the Development of Fundamental Human Rights", published in 2000, published by Ain O Salish Kendro
- "Right to Life and Its Dimensions", published in 2000, published by Ain O Salish Kendro
- "Practice of Democracy: Importance of Free and Fair Election in Bangladesh" presented as the keynote paper in a seminar organized by Bangladesh Institute of Law and International Affairs, Bangladesh Heritage Foundation
- "Electoral Rights: Bangladesh Perspective", Conference Report on Human Rights and Governance, Local and Global Perspective, 16–18 January 2005, Manusher Jonno and Partners
- "Regional Position Paper on Status of Women in South Asia" written for SAAPE as Regional Thematic Focal Person from Bangladesh.
