= Md Nurul Amin (Rangpur politician) =

Bangladeshi politician

Members of Parliament
- Incumbent
- Assumed office 17 February 2026
- Preceded by: Shirin Sharmin Chaudhury
- Constituency: Rangpur-6

Personal details
- Party: Bangladesh Jamaat-e-Islami
- Occupation: Politician

Md Nurul Amin is a Bangladeshi politician affiliated with Bangladesh Jamaat-e-Islami. He is an elected Member of Parliament from Rangpur-6.
