= Rangpur-6 =

Constituency of Bangladesh's Jatiya Sangsad

Coordinates: 25.42°N 89.31°E

- Constituency for the Jatiya Sangsad
- District: Rangpur District
- Division: Rangpur Division
- Electorate: 355,737 (2026)

Current constituency
- Created: 1973
- Party: Bangladesh Jamaat-e-Islami
- Member: Md. Nurul Amin
- ← 23 Rangpur-5 25 Kurigram-1 →

Rangpur-6 is a constituency represented in the Jatiya Sangsad (National Parliament) of Bangladesh since 2026 by Md. Nurul Amin of the Bangladesh Jamaat-e-Islami.

== Boundaries ==
The constituency encompasses Pirganj Upazila.

== History ==
The constituency was created for the first general elections in newly independent Bangladesh, held in 1973.

== Members of Parliament ==
Election	Member	Party
1973	Karim Uddin Mohammad	Awami League
1979	Mujibur Rahman	Bangladesh Nationalist Party
Major Boundary Changes
1986	Abdul Jalil Pradhan	Jatiya Party
Sep 1991 by-election	S. M. Hossain	Jatiya Party
Sep 1996 by-election	Nur Mohammad Mondal	Jatiya Party
2001	Nur Mohammad Mondal	Islami Jatiya Oikya Front
Apr 2009 by-election	Abul Kalam Azad	Awami League
2014	Shirin Sharmin Chaudhury	Awami League
2018	Shirin Sharmin Chaudhury	Awami League
2024	Shirin Sharmin Chaudhury	Awami League
2026	Md. Nurul Amin	Bangladesh Jamaat-e-Islami

== Elections ==
=== Elections in the 2020s ===
General election 2026: Rangpur-6
Party	Candidate	Votes	%	±%
Jamaat	Md. Nurul Amin	118,890		
BNP	Md. Saiful Islam	116,919		
Majority				
Turnout		244,970		
Registered electors		355,737		
Jamaat gain from AL				

=== Elections in the 2010s ===
Sheikh Hasina stood for two seats in the 2014 general election: Rangpur-6 and Gopalganj-3. After winning both, she chose to represent Gopalganj-3 and quit the other, triggering a by-election in Rangpur-6. Shirin Sharmin Chaudhury of the Awami League was elected unopposed in January 2014 after no one else filed to contest the by-election scheduled for February 2014.

General Election 2014: Rangpur-6
Party	Candidate	Votes	%	±%
AL	Sheikh Hasina	148,599	96.8	
JP(E)	Nur Alam Mia	4,959	3.2	
Majority		143,640	93.5	
Turnout		153,558	58.4	
AL hold				

=== Elections in the 2000s ===
Sheikh Hasina stood for three seats in the 2008 general election: Bagerhat-1, Rangpur-6, and Gopalganj-3. After winning all three, she chose to represent Gopalganj-3 and quit the other two, triggering by-elections in them. Abul Kalam Azad of the Awami League was elected in an April 2009 by-election, defeating BNP candidate Nur Muhammad Mandal.

General Election 2008: Rangpur-6
Party	Candidate	Votes	%	±%
AL	Sheikh Hasina	170,542	80.0	+35.4
BNP	Nur Mohammad Mondal	38,672	18.1	+15.1
Jamaat	Md. Shahjahan Ali	2,138	1.0	N/A
CPB	Kamruzzaman	1,199	0.6	+0.2
Gano Forum	Humayun Izaz Levin	668	0.3	N/A
Majority		131,870	61.8	+54.5
Turnout		213,219	90.0	+8.9
AL gain from IJOF				

General Election 2001: Rangpur-6
Party	Candidate	Votes	%	±%
IJOF	Nur Mohammad Mondal	90,730	51.9	
AL	Sheikh Hasina	77,991	44.6	
BNP	Abdul Jalil Pradhan	5,237	3.0	
CPB	Kamruzzaman	673	0.4	
Jatiya Party (M)	Md. Abu Hossain Sarkar	171	0.1	
JSD	Md. Abu Alam Mia	89	0.1	
Majority		12,739	7.3	
Turnout		174,891	81.1	
IJOF gain from JP(E)				

=== Elections in the 1990s ===
Hussain Muhammad Ershad stood from jail for five seats in the June 1996 general election: Rangpur-2, Rangpur-3, Rangpur-5, Rangpur-6, and Kurigram-3. After winning all five, he chose to represent Rangpur-3 and quit the other four, triggering by-elections in them. Nur Mohammad Mondal of the Jatiya Party (Ershad) was elected in a September 1996 by-election.

General Election June 1996: Rangpur-6
Party	Candidate	Votes	%	±%
JP(E)	Hussain Muhammad Ershad	60,665	52.0	
AL	Md. Matiar Rahman	37,661	32.3	
BNP	Md. Matiur Rahman Chowdhury	9,067	7.8	
Jamaat	Md. Abdus Salam Prodhan	7,577	6.5	
IOJ	Md. Golam Mastofa	832	0.7	
Zaker Party	Md. Azgar Ali	573	0.5	
Independent	Nur Mohammad Mondal	117	0.1	
Independent	Mosammat Merina Rahman	77	0.1	
Majority		23,004	19.7	
Turnout		116,569	68.3	
JP(E) hold				

Hussain Muhammad Ershad stood from jail for five seats in the 1991 general election: Rangpur-1, Rangpur-2, Rangpur-3, Rangpur-5, and Rangpur-6. After winning all five, he chose to represent Rangpur-3 and quit the other four, triggering by-elections in them. S. M. Hossain, of the Jatiya Party, was elected in a September 1991 by-election.

General Election 1991: Rangpur-6
Party	Candidate	Votes	%	±%
JP(E)	Hussain Muhammad Ershad	35,260	38.4	
AL	Md. Matiar Rahman	34,935	38.1	
Jamaat	Abdus Salam Prodhan	10,095	11.0	
Independent	Abdul Jalil Pradhan	4,658	5.1	
JSD	Md. Abdus Sobhan	2,870	3.1	
BNP	Nur Mohammad Mondal	2,750	3.0	
Zaker Party	Md. Azgar Ali	1,198	1.3	
Majority		325	0.4	
Turnout		91,766	55.4	
JP(E) hold				
