= Abdur Razzaq (lawyer, 1949–2025) =

Bangladeshi lawyer (1949–2025)

- আব্দুর রাজ্জাক
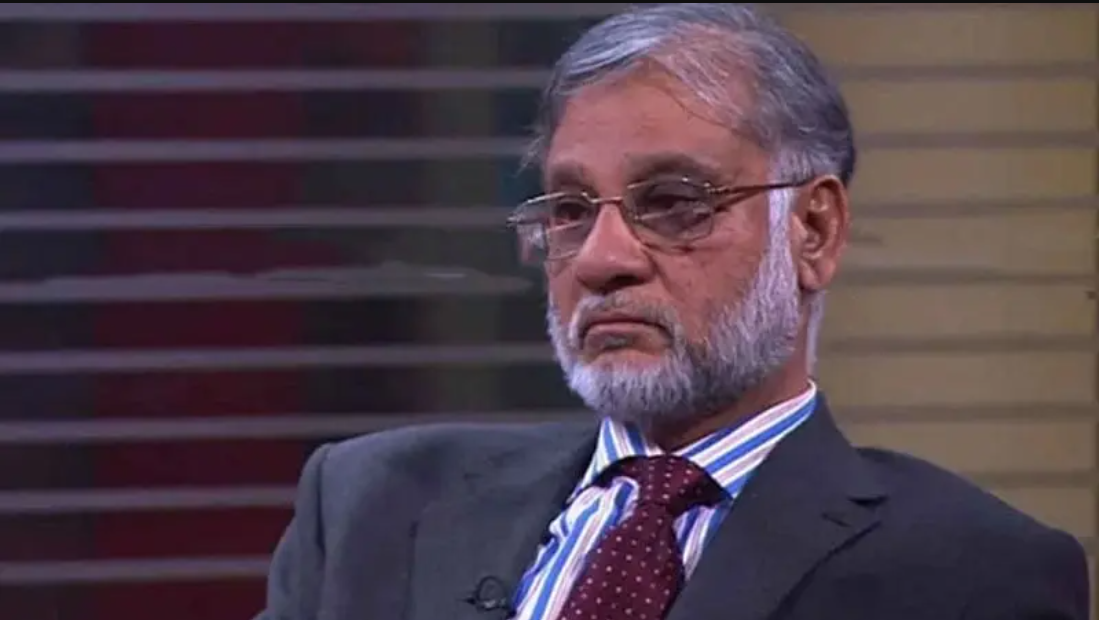
- Born: 1949; Beanibazar, Sylhet District, East Bengal, Pakistan
- Died: 4 May 2025 (aged 75); Dhaka, Bangladesh
- Occupations: Lawyer, politician
- Known for: Chief defence counsel at ICT
- Political party: Bangladesh Jamaat-e-Islami

Abdur Razzaq (1949 – 4 May 2025) was a Bangladeshi barrister, professor and assistant secretary general of Bangladesh Jamaat-e-Islami. He was the chief defence counsel at Bangladesh's International Crimes Tribunal until the end of 2013, when he moved to London, where he kept practising at the English Bar.

== Background ==
Abdur Razzaq was born in 1949 in Shekhlal village of Beanibazar Upazila, Sylhet District in the then East Bengal. He earned his Barrister-at-Law degree from Lincoln's Inn in London. He then returned to Bangladesh in 1986 and started his legal profession.

== Career ==
=== International Crimes Tribunal ===
Razzaq was the chief defence counsel at Bangladesh's International Crimes Tribunal, where Jamaat leaders, in particular, were indicted. Among those defended by Razzaq were former leader Ghulam Azam, leader Motiur Rahman Nizami, executive council member Delwar Hossain Sayedee, Secretary General Ali Ahsan Mohammad Mojaheed, and Assistant Secretary General Abdul Quader Mollah. Razzaq allegedly was harassed in various ways by government officials to make it difficult for him to perform his professional duties. Human Rights Watch called for him to be allowed to conduct a full and fair defence without hindrance.

=== Resignation from BJI ===
Razzaq resigned from his position as Bangladesh Jamaat-e-Islami Assistant Secretary General in an e-mail sent from London on 15 February 2019. In his resignation message, he said that for two decades he had tried to convince Jamaat that there should be open discussion on the role of the party in the 1971 war, and that the party should apologize for its role at that time. He also stated that he had unsuccessfully advocated for structural reforms, as well as full and effective participation of women, among other measures, in order to bring the party in line with successful and modern models used in other Muslim-majority nations. Aside from within Jamaat itself, his resignation also sparked widespread discussion in Bangladeshi politics. Following him, some leaders resigned from the party as well. Since then, these former leaders have come together to form an independent party called the Amar Bangladesh Party, where he was appointed chief adviser to the party. Later he left the Amar Bangladesh Party.

== Illness and death ==
Razzaq was diagnosed with prostate cancer in 2020. In late 2024, he returned to Bangladesh from the UK, where he had been living since 2013. He died while undergoing medical treatment at Ibn Sina Hospital in Dhaka on 4 May 2025, at the age of 75. The Bangladesh Supreme Court remained closed for half a day in his memory, as Chief Justice Syed Refaat Ahmed expressed deep shock to family members at his death. Funeral prayers for the eminent lawyer were held at the Supreme Court's Inner Garden premises.
