= Paritosh Chakrabarti =

Bangladeshi politician

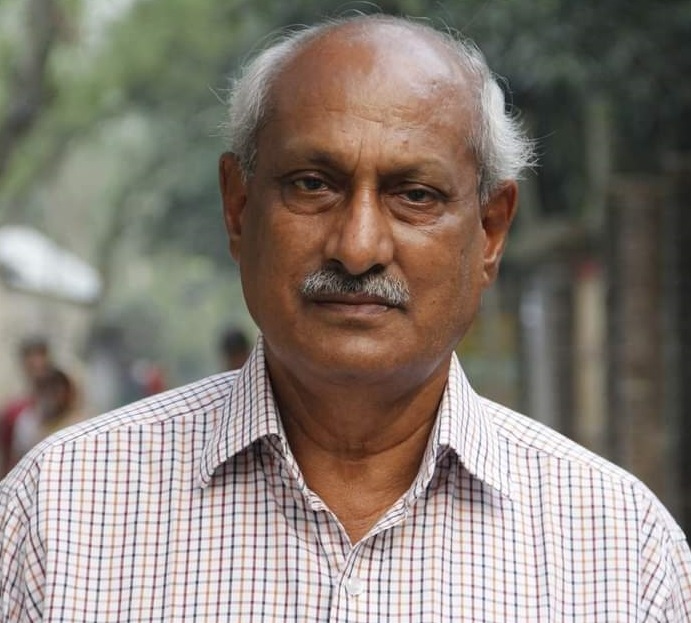

Member of Bangladesh Parliament

Personal details
- Party: Bangladesh Nationalist Party

Paritosh Chakrabarti is a Bangladesh Nationalist Party politician and a former member of parliament for Rangpur-2.

== Career ==
Chakrabarti was elected to parliament from Rangpur-2 as a Jatiya Party candidate in a 1996 by-election. The by-elections were called after Hussain Mohammad Ershad, who was elected from 5 constituencies, resigned and chose to represent Rangpur-3. He left the Jatiya Party and joined the Bangladesh Nationalist Party. He served as the vice-president of the Rangpur District unit of the Bangladesh Nationalist Party. He resigned from the Bangladesh Nationalist Party on 12 August 2016.
