= Badarganj Upazila =

Badarganj বদরগঞ্জ
- Upazila
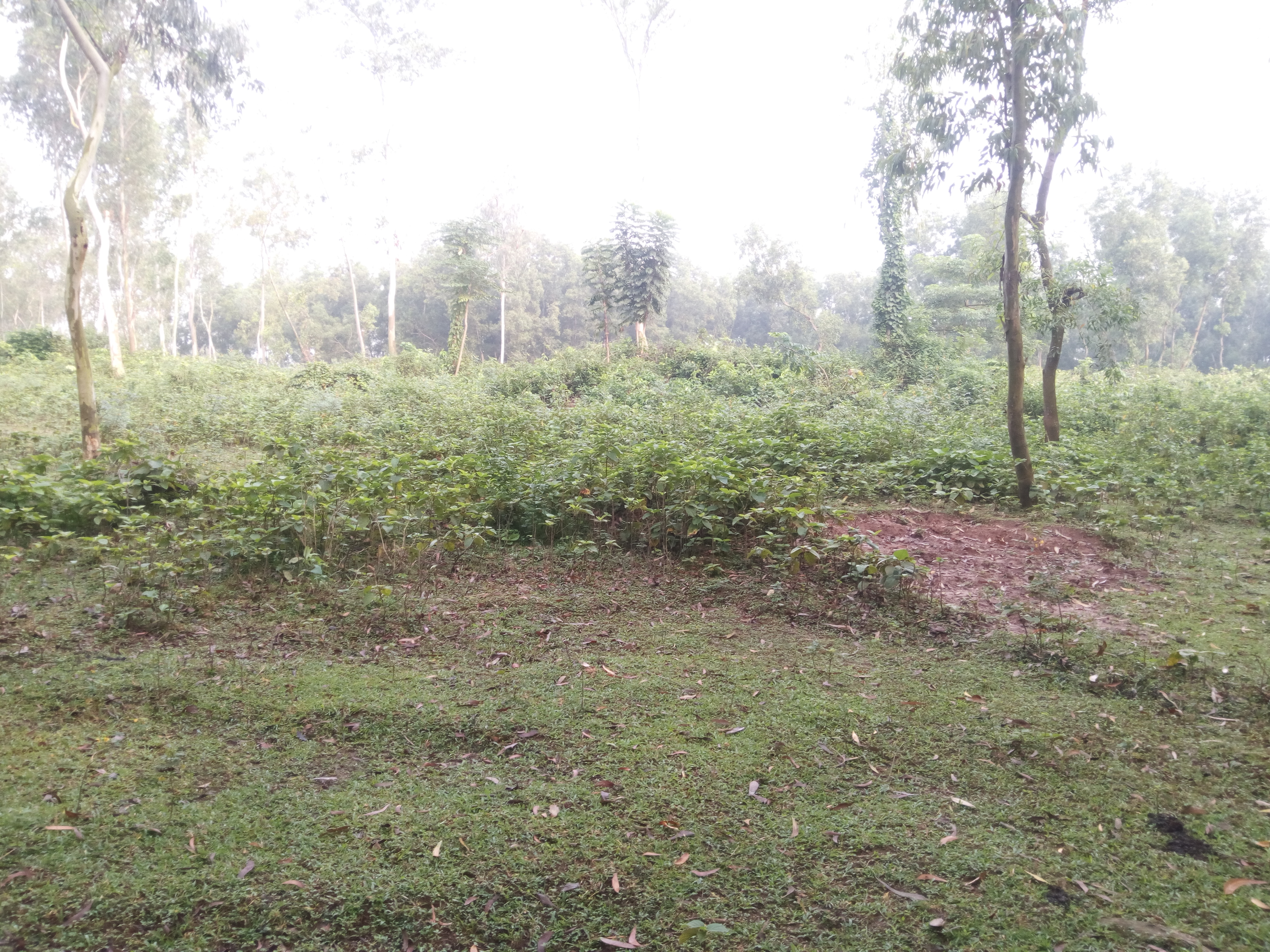
- Chaprakot Mound, Badarganj

- Coordinates: 25°40′N 89°03′E
- Country: Bangladesh
- Division: Rangpur
- District: Rangpur

Area
  - Total: 301.28 km^{2} (116.32 sq mi)

Population (2022)
  - Total: 314,865
  - Density: 1,045.1/km^{2} (2,706.8/sq mi)
- Time zone: UTC+6 (BST)
- Postal code: 5430
- Area code: 05222
- Website: Official Map of Badarganj

Badarganj Upazila mauza geocode map

Badarganj (Bengali: বদরগঞ্জ) is an Upazila of Rangpur District in Rangpur Division, Bangladesh.

Badarganj is named after the mystic-saint Hazrat Badaruddin Shah. His tomb is situated in the middle of the town. After the conquests of Bengal, Turki Commander Ikhtiyar Uddin Muhammad bin Bakhtiyar Khilji stopped over at a field at Mansinghapur, Madai Khamar during his invasion of Tibet in 1203 AD to feed his horses. After that event, the field was named 'Bakhtiyar Danga'.

== History ==
Legend has it that Badarganj is named after the mystic-saint Hazrat Badaruddin Shah. His tomb is situated in the middle of the town.

After the conquests of Bengal, Turk Commander Ikhtiyar Uddin Muhammad bin Bakhtiyar Khilji stopped over at a field at Mansinghapur, Madai Khamar during his invasion of Tibet in 1203 AD to feed his horses. After that event, the field is named 'Bakhtiyar Danga'.

At Jharuar Beel and Padmapukur, mass killing occurred during the independence war of Bangladesh.

== Geography ==
Badarganj is located at 25°40′N 89°03′E. It has a total area 301.28 km^{2}. It is surrounded by Taraganj Upazila, Rangpur Sadar Upazila and Saidpur Upazila on the north, Nawabganj Upazila on the south, Rangpur Sadar Upazila and Mithapukur Upazilas on the east, Parbatipur Upazila on the west.

=== Rivers and depressions ===
Jamuneshwari, Chirnai, Katgara and Chikli are main rivers that run through Badarganj. Bhelakoba, Nandair, Chaprar, Haribhanga beels are main depressions.

== Demographics ==
Historical population
| Year | Pop. (000) | ±% |
|---|---|---|
| 1981 | 179 | — |
| 1991 | 213 | +19.0% |
| 2001 | 258 | +21.1% |
| 2011 | 288 | +11.6% |
| 2022 | 315 | +9.4% |
Source: Bangladesh Bureau of Statistics

Religions in Badarganj Upazila (2022)
| Religion | Percent |
| Islam | 87.66% |
| Hinduism | 11.60% |
| Christianity | 0.64% |
| Other or not stated | 0.10% |

According to the 2022 Bangladeshi census, Badarganj Upazila had 82,135 households and a population of 314,865. 9.55% of the population were under 5 years of age. Badarganj had a literacy rate (age 7 and over) of 68.32%: 70.50% for males and 66.22% for females, and a sex ratio of 97.25 males for every 100 females. 45,755 (14.53%) lived in urban areas. Ethnic population was 2,063 (0.66%), the largest group being Santals and Oraons.

According to the 2011 Census of Bangladesh, Badarganj Upazila had 71,982 households and a population of 287,746. 68,423 (23.78%) were under 10 years of age. Badarganj had a literacy rate (age 7 and over) of 42.99%, compared to the national average of 51.8%, and a sex ratio of 995 females per 1,000 males. 25,286 (8.79%) lived in urban areas. Ethnic population was 3,164 (1.10%), of which Santal were 1,556 and Oraon 1,307.

As of the 1991 Bangladesh census, Badarganj has a population of 213431. Males constitute are 51.28% of the population, and females 48.72%. This Upazila's eighteen up population is 109,320. Badarganj has an average literacy rate of 23.9% (7+ years), and the national average of 32.4% literate.

== Economy ==
Badarganj is well known for the production of shataranchi (a kind of tapestry). Among other cottage industries of the upazila are bamboo work 159, weaving 15, goldsmith 8, blacksmith 12, potteries 20, wood work 40, tailoring 30, bidi 70.

== Points of interest ==
Among Archaeological heritage and relics are Nine-domed Mosque at Lal Dighir Par of Radhanagar union, tomb of Kutub Shah at Kutubpur union, Bakhtyar Danga, Vhim Garh at Mansinghapur, Madai Khamar, Zamindar Bari at Dilalpur.

== Administration ==
UNO: Md. Nazir Hossain.

Badarganj was made a thana in 1905 and was turned into an upazila in 1983.

Badarganj Upazila is divided into Badarganj Municipality and ten union parishads: Bishnupur, Damodarpur, Gopalpur, Gopinathpur, Kalupara, Kutubpur, Lohanipara, Madhupur, Radhanagar, and Ramnathpur. The union parishads are subdivided into 64 mauzas and 120 villages.

Health centres include Upazila health complex 1, union health and family welfare centre 10, health centre 1. Religious institutions Mosque 315, temple 32, church 6, sacred place 1. There are above hats, bazars and fairs Total in Badarganj. The most noted hats and bazars are Badarganj, Laldighi, Kutubpur, Bagmara, Faridpur, Bakshmiganj, Bagarganj, Mominpur hat; noted fairs are Badarganj fair, Pirpal (Laldighi) Fair, Bakshmiganj and Badarganj fair. BRAC, ASA, Grameen bank, RDRS, Seba, Grambikash are active NGOs in Badarganj.

== See also ==
- Upazilas of Bangladesh
- Districts of Bangladesh
- Divisions of Bangladesh
- Administrative geography of Bangladesh
