= Anisul Haque Chowdhury (Rangpur politician) =

Bangladeshi politician

- আনিসুল হক চৌধুরী

Member of Bangladesh Parliament

Member of Parliament for Rangpur-7
- Incumbent
- Assumed office 1973
- Preceded by: Mohammad Amin
- Succeeded by: Mohammad Kamal Uddin Haider

Member of Parliament for Rangpur-2
- In office 1986–1988

Member of Parliament for Rangpur-2
- Incumbent
- Assumed office 1996

Personal details
- Died: 85 years Rangpur Medical College Hospital
- Party: Bangladesh Awami League

Anisul Haque Chowdhury was a Bangladesh Awami League politician and a member of parliament for Rangpur-7 and Rangpur-2.

== Career ==
Chowdhury was elected to parliament from Rangpur-7 as a Bangladesh Awami League candidate in 1973. He was elected to parliament from Rangpur-2 as a Bangladesh Awami League candidate in 1986. He was elected to parliament from Rangpur-2 as a Bangladesh Awami League candidate in a 1996 by-election. He served as a state minister.

== Death ==
Chowdhury died on 11 January 2011 at Rangpur Medical College Hospital in Rangpur City, Bangladesh.
