= Anisul Islam Mondal =

Bangladeshi politician

- আনিসুল ইসলাম মন্ডল

Member of Parliament for Rangpur-2
- In office 25 January 2009 – 24 January 2014
- Preceded by: Mohammad Ali Sarkar
- Succeeded by: AKMA Hoque Chowdhury

Personal details
- Born: 25 August 1966 (age 59)
- Party: Jatiya Party (Ershad)

Anisul Islam Mondal (born 25 August 1966) is a Jatiya Party (Ershad) politician and a former Jatiya Sangsad member representing the Rangpur-2 constituency.

== Career ==
Mondal was elected to parliament from Rangpur-2 as a Jatiya Party candidate in 2008.
