= Anwarul Haque =

Bangladeshi Judge

- Born: c. 1956; Dhaka, East Pakistan, Pakistan
- Died: 13 July 2017 (aged 61); Dhaka, Bangladesh
- Education: University of Dhaka

Anwarul Haque (c. 1956 – 13 July 2017) was a Bangladesh Supreme Court justice who served as the Chairman of International Crimes Tribunal-1.

== Education ==
Anwarul Haque completed Secondary School Certificate (SSC) from Dhaka Government Muslim High School and Higher Secondary Certificate (HSC) from Notre Dame College, Dhaka. He completed his bachelor's in law from the University of Dhaka.

== Career ==
Anwarul Haque started practicing law in 1980. On 1 December 1981, he joined the judicial service as an Assistant Judge and later became a District and Sessions Judge in 1997. He was elevated as Additional Judge of the High Court Division of Bangladesh Supreme Court on 12 December 2010, and was appointed Judge of the same Division of the Supreme Court of Bangladesh on 10 December 2012.

On 15 September 2015, Anwarul Haque was appointed as the chairman of International Crimes Tribunal-1. Prior to his appointment as the chairman, he had worked as a member of the same tribunal since 25 March 2012.

Anwarul Haque was the head of the Governing Board of the SAARC Arbitration Council and was a member of the Commonwealth Association of Legislative Counsel since 1988.

== Personal life and health ==
Anwarul Haque was married to Alatunnesa. He was diagnosed with lung cancer in January 2017 and took treatment in Bangladesh and Singapore. He was admitted to Bangabandhu Sheikh Mujib Medical University on 5 July and died on 13 July.
