= Taraganj Upazila =

Taragonj তারাগঞ্জ
- Upazila
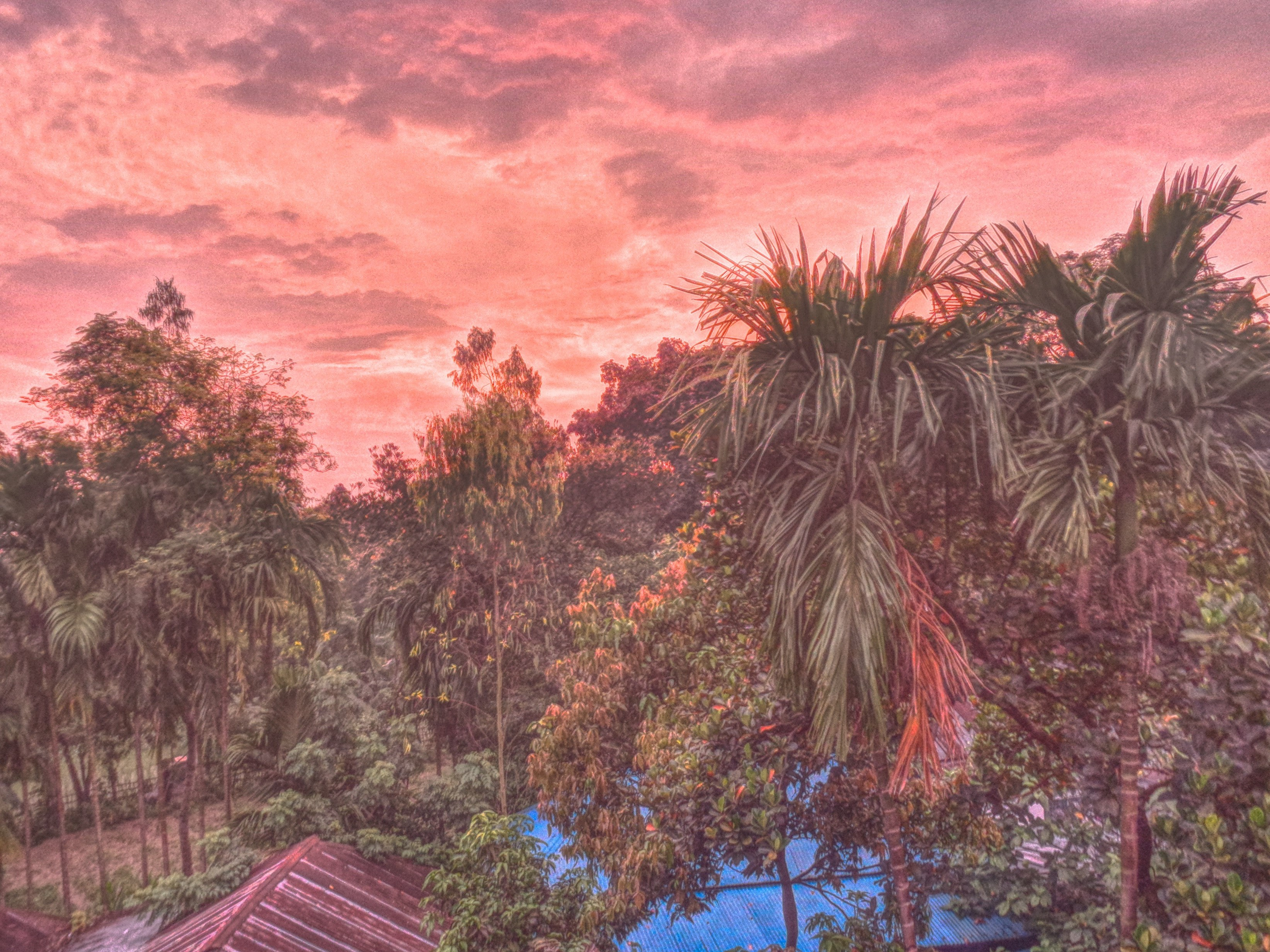
- Twilight in Taraganj

- Coordinates: 25°48.7′N 89°1′E
- Country: Bangladesh
- Division: Rangpur
- District: Rangpur

Area
  - Total: 128.66 km^{2} (49.68 sq mi)

Population (2022)
  - Total: 160,895
  - Density: 1,250.5/km^{2} (3,238.9/sq mi)
- Demonym(s): Taraganji, Taragonji
- Time zone: UTC+6 (BST)
- Postal code: 5420
- Website: Official Website of Taragonj

Taraganj Upazila mauza geocode map

Taraganj (Bengali: তারাগঞ্জ) is an upazila of Rangpur District in the Division of Rangpur, Bangladesh.

== Geography ==
Taragonj is located at 25.8111°N 89.0167°E. It has 34,119 households and total area 128.66 km^{2}.

== Demographics ==
Religions in Taraganj Upazila (2022)
Religion	Percent
Islam	87.77%
Hinduism	12.22%
Other or not stated	0.01%

According to the 2022 Bangladeshi census, Taraganj Upazila had 40,274 households and a population of 160,895. 9.51% of the population were under 5 years of age. Taraganj had a literacy rate (age 7 and over) of 68.07%: 70.39% for males and 65.77% for females, and a sex ratio of 99.63 males for every 100 females. 23,239 (14.44%) lived in urban areas.

According to the 2011 Census of Bangladesh, Taraganj Upazila had 34,119 households and a population of 142,512. 35,477 (24.89%) were under 10 years of age. Taraganj had a literacy rate (age 7 and over) of 43.76%, compared to the national average of 51.8%, and a sex ratio of 982 females per 1000 males. 7,906 (5.55%) lived in urban areas.

As of the 1991 Bangladesh census, Taraganj has a population of 105393. Males constitute are 51.48% of the population, and females 48.52%. This Upazila's eighteen up population is 52373. Taraganj has an average literacy rate of 23.3% (7+ years), and the national average of 32.4% literate.

== Points of interest ==
Taragonj Haat is a famous & big in the northern side of Bangladesh and also it is called a business linkage place of Rangpur district. Tara BIBI's mazar is situated in the middle of the Haat. and by the name of TARA BIBI Taragonj was name and it is populated to the people.

In Sadar of Taraganj there is 50 beds hospital, One Degree College, Degree Madrasa, One Boys high school, Girls high school.

== Administration ==
UNO: Md. Rubel Rana.

Taraganj Upazila is divided into five union parishads: Alampur, Ekarchali, Hariarkuti, Kursha, and Sayar. The union parishads are subdivided into 40 mauzas and 41 villages.

== See also ==
- Upazilas of Bangladesh
- Districts of Bangladesh
- Divisions of Bangladesh
