= Abdul Jalil Pradhan =

Bangladeshi politician

Member of Bangladesh Parliament
- Preceded by: Mujibur Rahman
- Succeeded by: S. M. Hossain

Personal details
- Party: Jatiya Party (Ershad)

Abdul Jalil Pradhan is a Jatiya Party (Ershad) politician and a former member of parliament for Rangpur-6.

== Career ==
Pradhan was elected to parliament from Rangpur-6 as a Jatiya Party candidate in 1986 and 1988.
