= Mohammad Ali Sarkar =

Bangladeshi politician

Member of Bangladesh Parliament
- In office 2001–2006

Personal details
- Party: Jatiya Party (Ershad)

Mohammad Ali Sarkar is a politician and a former member of parliament for Rangpur-2.

== Career ==
Sarkar was elected to parliament from Rangpur-2 as a Jatiya Party candidate in 2001.
