= Nur Mohammad Mondal =

Bangladeshi politician

Member of Parliament

Personal details
- Political party: Bangladesh Nationalist Party

Nur Mohammad Mondal is a Bangladesh Nationalist Party politician and a former member of parliament from Rangpur-6.

== Career ==
Mondal was elected to parliament from Rangpur-6 in 1996 as a Jatiya Party candidate. He was re-elected to parliament in 2001 as an Islami Jatiya Oikya Front candidate, beating his closest opponent, Sheikh Hasina of the Bangladesh Awami League. He contested the 2008 election as a Bangladesh Nationalist Party candidate but lost to Sheikh Hasina. In 2014, he was elected chairman of Pirganj Upazila Parishad of Rangpur District.
