= Rangpur District =

District of Rangpur Division in Bangladesh

Rangpur District রংপুর জেলা
- District of Bangladesh
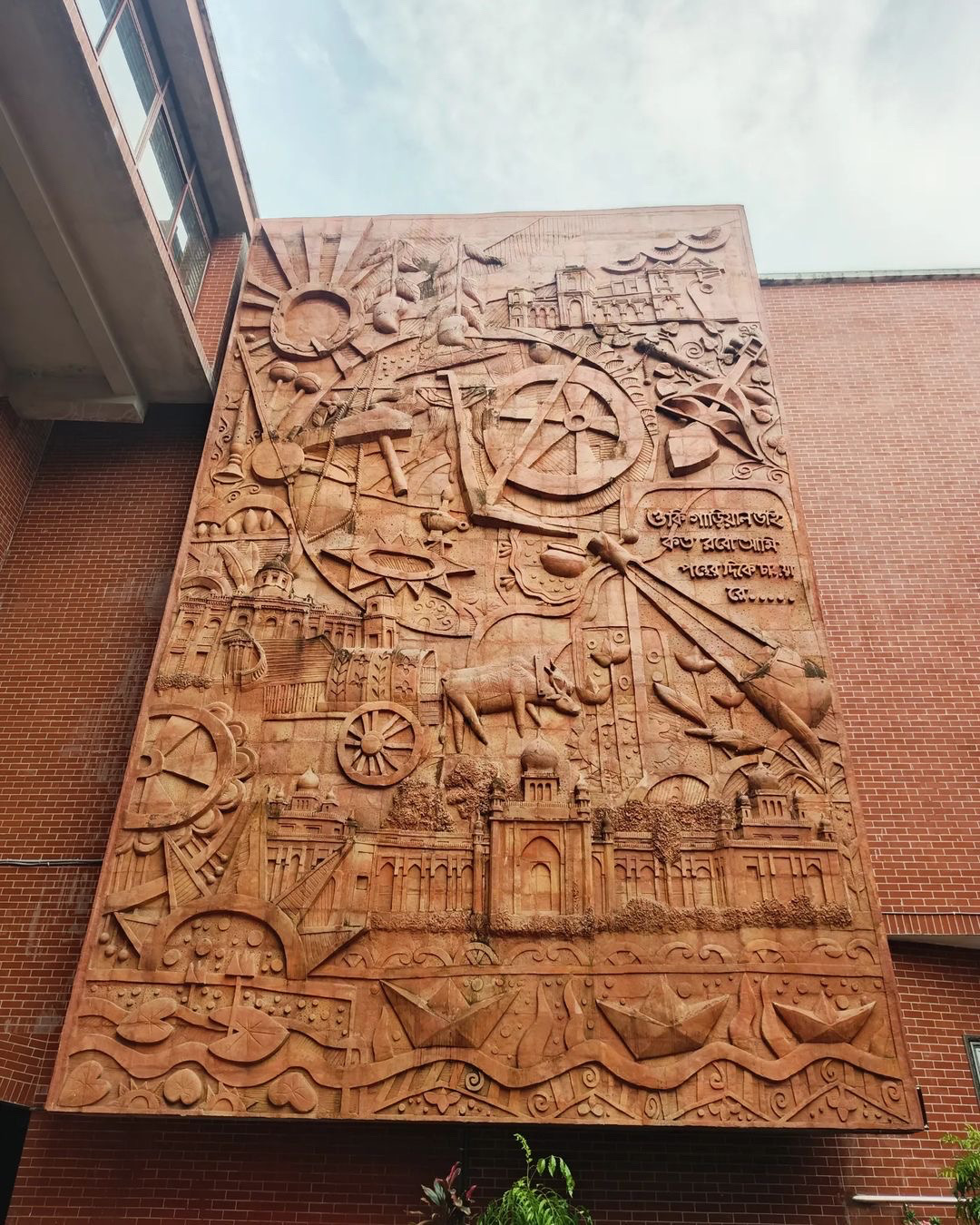
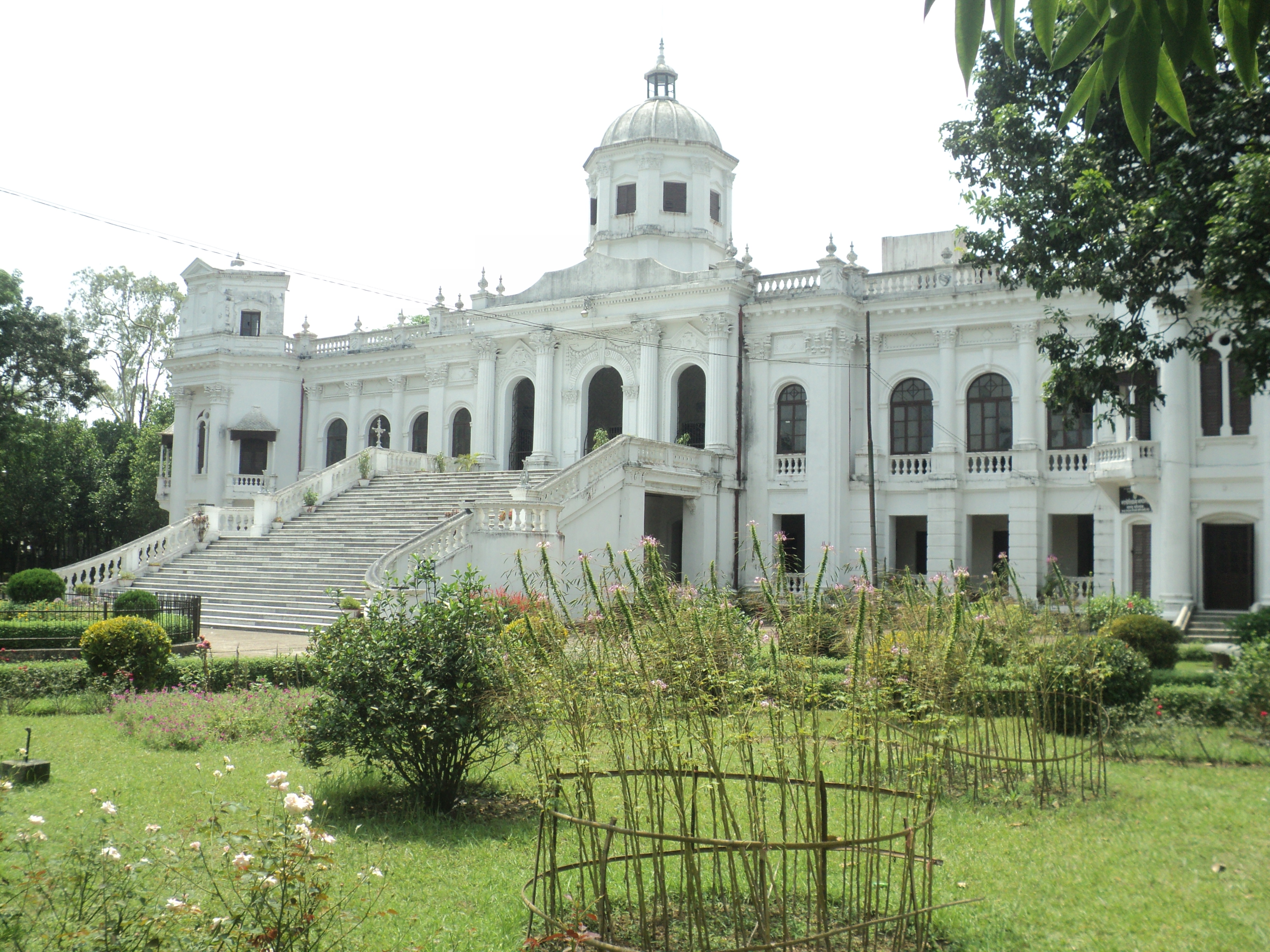
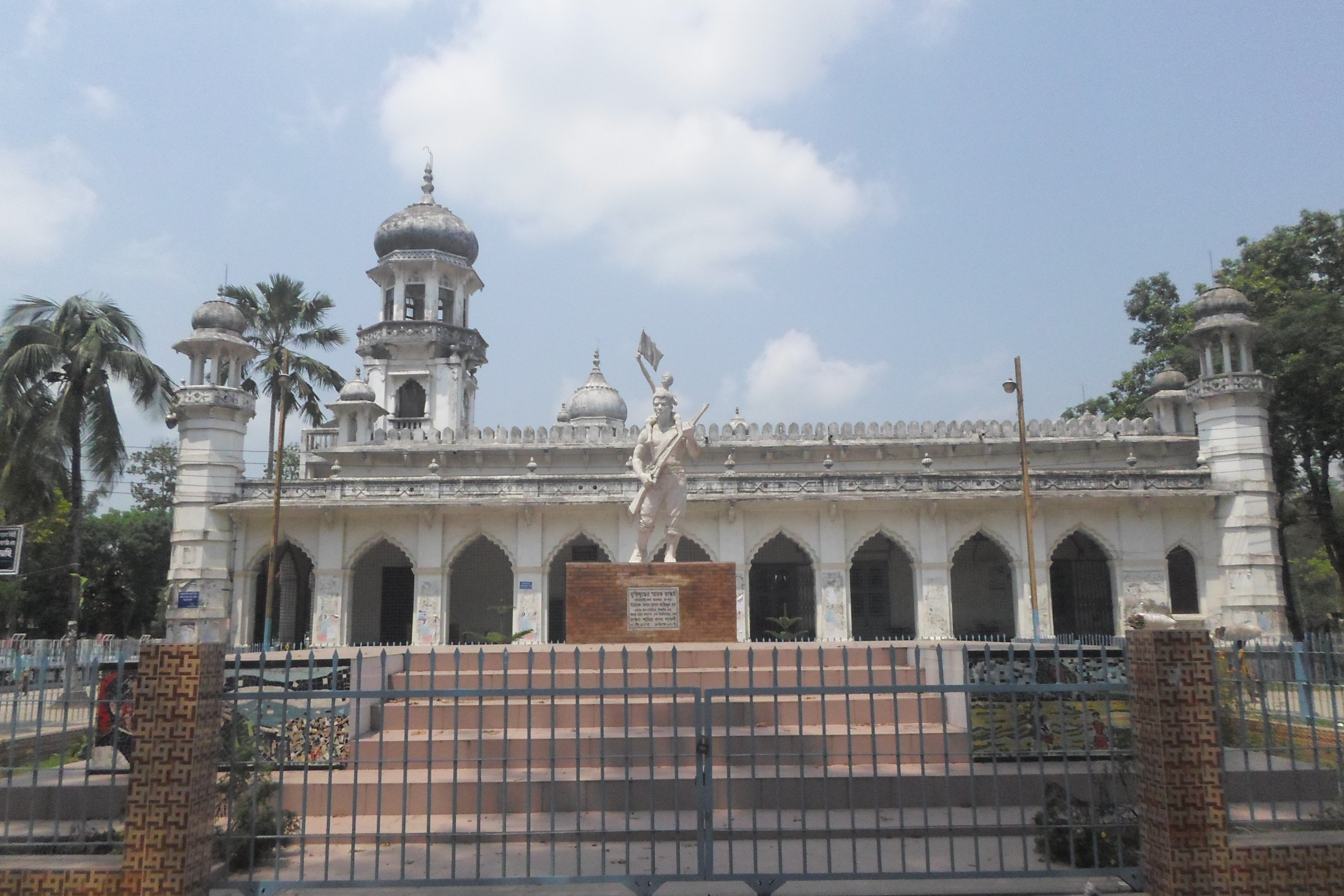
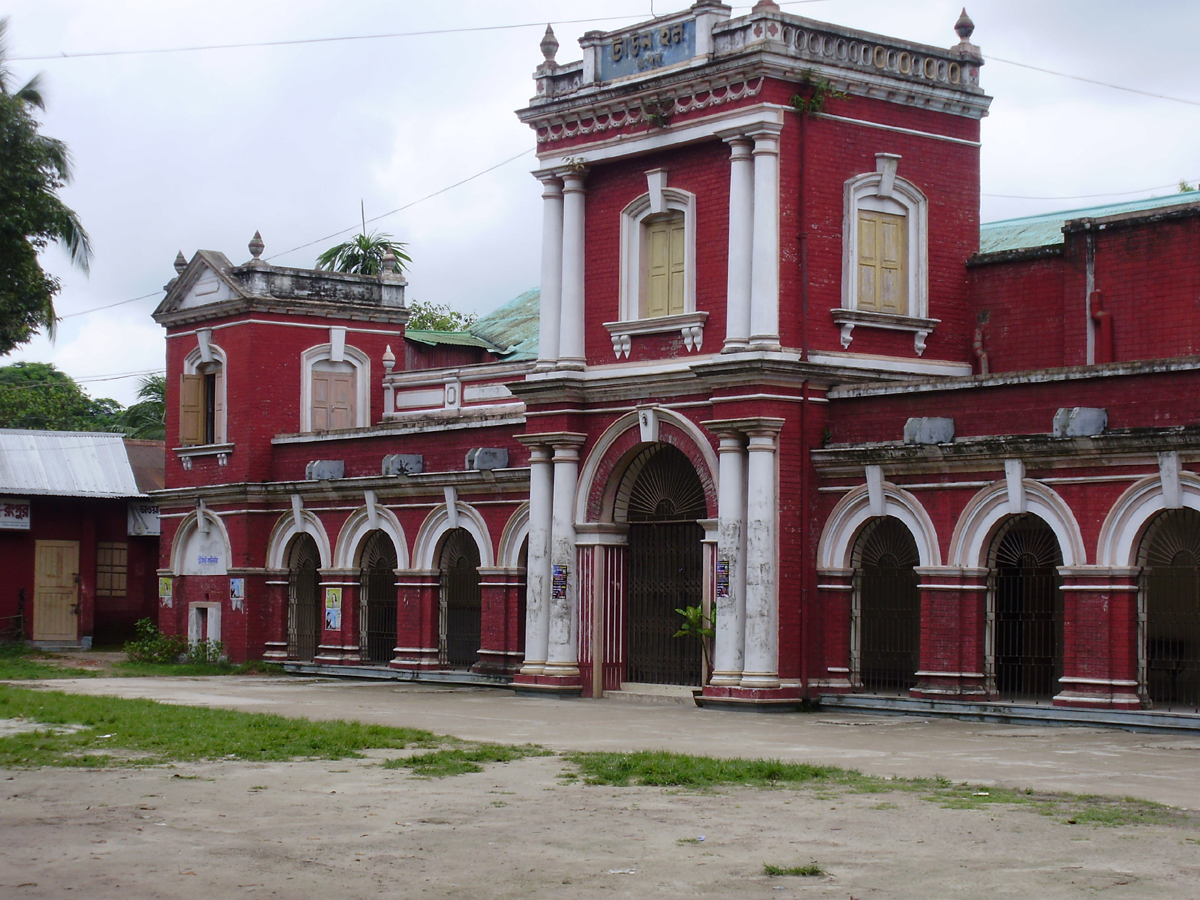
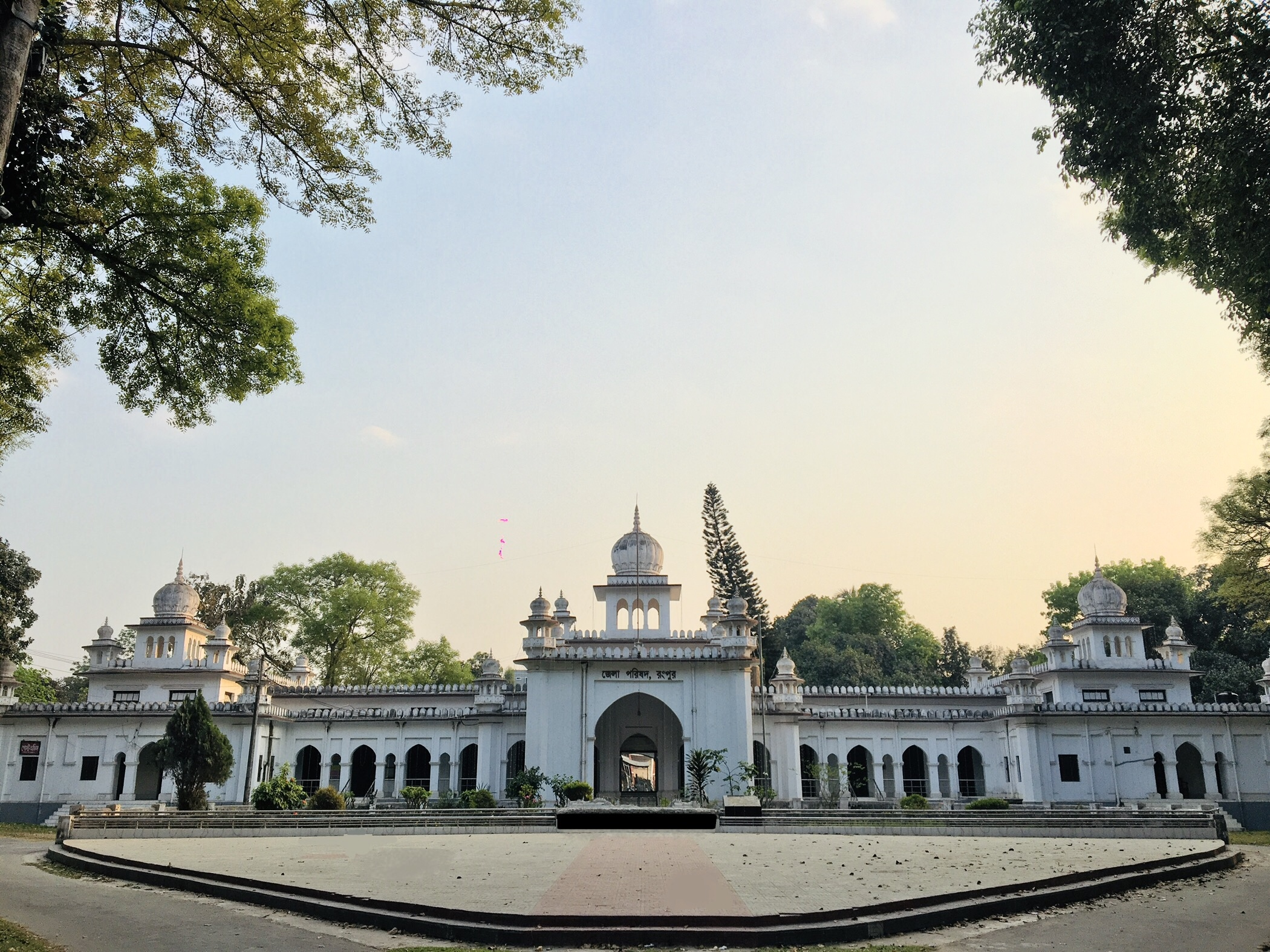
- Wall of Rangpur Cultural Academy Tajhat Palace Carmichael College Rangpur Town Hall Zilla Parishad, Rangpur
- Nicknames: Ongpur,ompur
- Location of Rangpur District in Bangladesh
- Expandable map of Rangpur District
- Coordinates: 25°44′N 89°15′E
- Country: Bangladesh
- Division: Rangpur Division
- Headquarter: Rangpur
- Established: 1769

Government
  - Type: District Council
  - Deputy Commissioner: Mohammad Enamul Ahsan

Area
  - District of Bangladesh: 2,400.56 km^{2} (926.86 sq mi)
  - Metro: 240 km^{2} (93 sq mi)
- Elevation: 34 m (112 ft)

Population (2022)
  - District of Bangladesh: 3,169,614
  - Density: 1,320/km^{2} (3,400/sq mi)
- Demonym(s): Rangpuri, Rongpuri
- Time zone: UTC+06:00 (BST)
- Postal code: 5400
- Area code: 0521
- ISO 3166 code: BD-55
- HDI (2022): 0.673 medium · 15th of 21
- Website: rangpur.gov.bd

Rangpur District (Bengali: রংপুর জেলা) is a district in northern Bengal, It is a part of Rangpur Division, Bangladesh.

== History ==
Rangpur was conquered by the army of Raja Man Singh, a commander of the Mughal emperor, and Akbar, in 1575, but it was only until 1686 that it was fully integrated into the Mughal Empire. Place names such as Mughalbasa ('Mughal locality') and Mughalhat ('Mughal market') bear testimony to the Mughal association and past of Rangpur and its hinterland. Later on, Rangpur passed under the control of "Sarker" of Ghoraghat. During the period of the East India Company, the Fakir-Sannyasi rebellion took place. The Greater Rangpur district was divided in five districts in 1984.

The population of the district is 2.9 million according to the 2011 census. There has been a 1.2% annual population growth between 2001 and 2011. The population density of the area is 1,200/km^{2}.

== Geography ==
Under the Rangpur Division (one of eight divisions) composed of eight districts of northern Bangladesh, the District of Rangpur is bordered on the north by Nilphamari District, on the south by Gaibandha District, on the east by Kurigram, and on the west by Dinajpur district. Rangpur town is the divisional headquarter. The soil composition is mainly alluvial soil (80%) of the Teesta River basin, and the remaining is barind soil. The temperature ranges from 32–11 °C (90–52 °F), and the annual rainfall averages 2,931 mm (9.616 ft).

== Demographics ==
Historical population
Year	Pop.	±% p.a.
1974	1,380,623	—
1981	1,707,264	+3.08%
1991	2,160,346	+2.38%
2001	2,542,441	+1.64%
2011	2,881,086	+1.26%
2022	3,169,614	+0.87%

According to the 2022 Census of Bangladesh, Rangpur District had 834,307 households and a population of 3,169,614, of whom 32.55% of lived in urban areas. 17.54% of the population was under 10 years of age. The population density was 1,320 people per km^{2}. The literacy rate (age 7 and over) was 70.73%, compared to the national average of 74.80%, and the sex ratio was 98.04 females per 1000 males.

Religions in Rangpur District (2022)
Religion	Percent
Islam	90.64%
Hinduism	8.96%
Other or not stated	0.40%

Religion in present-day Rangpur District
Religion	1941 (Note: 1941 figures are for Sadar subdivision of erstwhile Rangpur district excluding Kaliganj and Hatibandha thanas, which roughly corresponds to the present district.)		1981		1991		2001		2011		2022	
Religion	Pop.	%	Pop.	%	Pop.	%	Pop.	%	Pop.	%	Pop.	%
Islam	481,350	74.81%	1,518,354	88.93%	1,935,622	89.60%	2,296,790	90.34%	2,604,263	90.39%	2,872,953	90.64%
Hinduism	148,270	23.04%	172,262	10.09%	207,072	9.58%	229,963	9.04%	258,684	8.98%	283,964	8.96%
Tribal religion	13,550	2.11%	—N/a	—N/a	—N/a	—N/a	—N/a	—N/a	—N/a	—N/a	—N/a	—N/a
Others (Note: Including Jainism, Christianity, Buddhism, Zoroastrianism, Judaism, Ad-Dharmis, or not stated)	242	0.04%	16,648	0.98%	17,652	0.82%	15,688	0.62%	18,139	0.63%	12,697	0.40%
Total Population	643,412	100%	1,707,264	100%	2,160,346	100%	2,542,441	100%	2,881,086	100%	3,169,614	100%

Muslims make up 90.64% of the population, while Hindus are 8.96% of the population. The majority of Hindus are Rajbanshis. Other minorities are mainly Christians who are found among ethnic minorities. The ethnic population was 15,947 (0.50%), of which 8,580 were Oraon and 4,687 were Santal.

== Administration ==
Rangpur District upazila geocode map

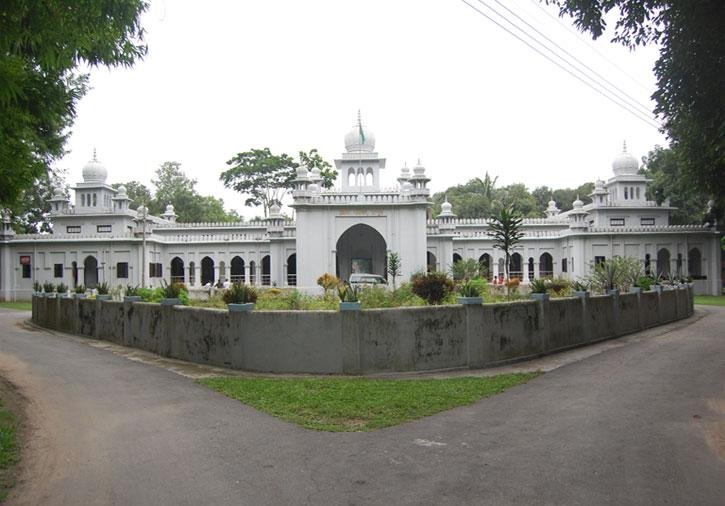
Zilla Porishod Building.

The district has 1 city corporation and 3 municipalities, namely, Rangpur City Corporation, Badarganj, Haragach, and Peerganj, and eight upazilas, namely:

- Badarganj
- Mithapukur
- Gangachara
- Kaunia
- Rangpur Sadar
- Pirgacha
- Pirganj
- Taraganj

Rangpur town, covering an area of around 43 square kilometers, lies on the bank of the Ghaghat river and was turned into a municipality back in 1869. Rangpur City Corporation, which was founded in 2012, has a population of 294,000. The city has an area of 50.7 km^{2} (19.6 sq mi).

== Places of interest ==
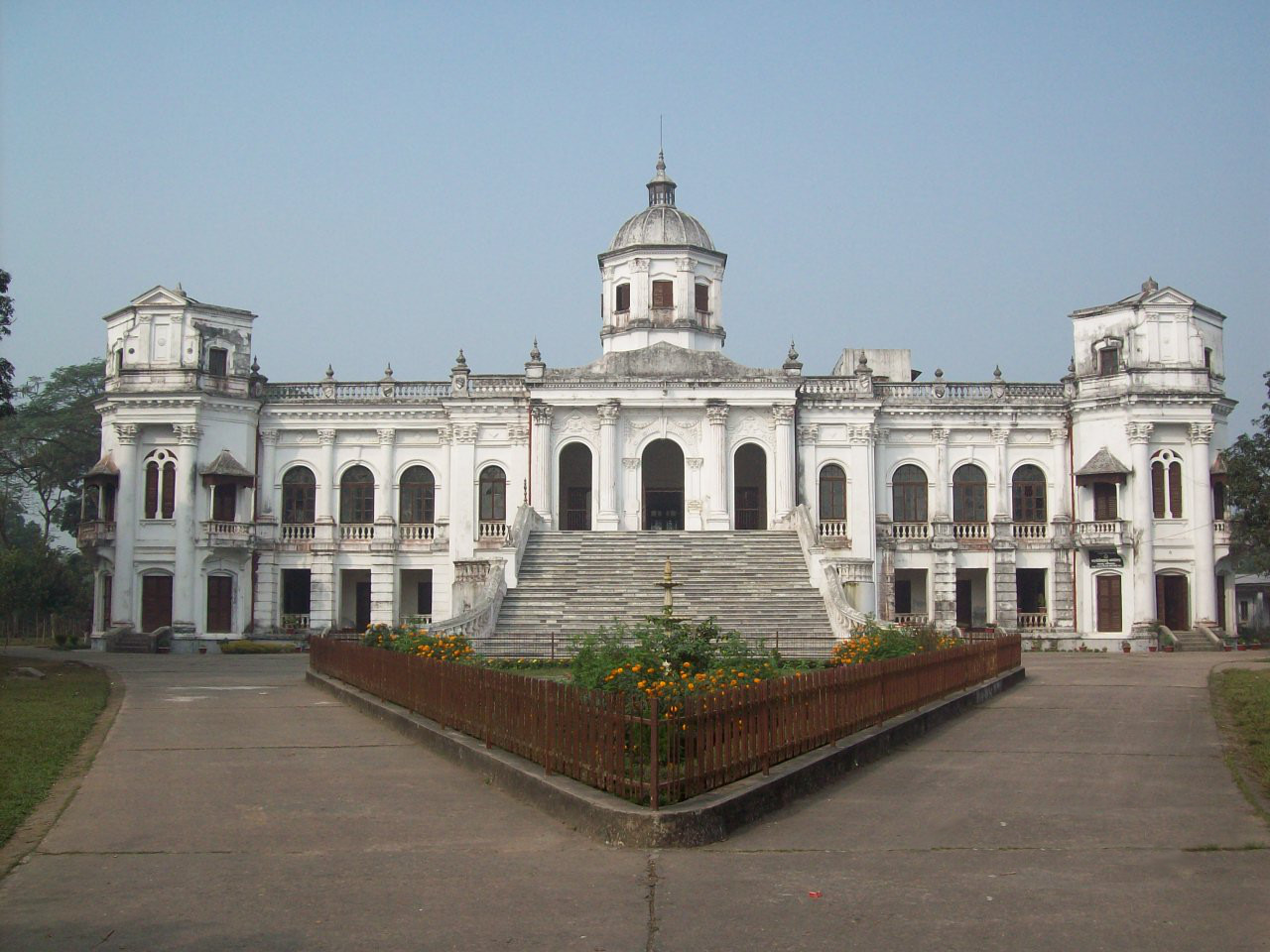
Tajhat Palace in Rangpur

Just south of the city of Rangpur lies the Tajhat Zamindar's palace. After the end of the British Raj, the building was abandoned and decayed rapidly, although it was used for a few years as a courthouse during the 1980s. In the year 2004, it was largely restored and turned into a museum with ancient inscriptions, art, and coins from the area on display. RDRS (Rangpur and Dinajpur Rural Service) Bangladesh, an NGO in northwest Bangladesh, has a large office and guesthouse/convention center in the town of Rangpur.

A museum and women's training center was established in Pairabondh, the birthplace of Begum Rokeya. It is half an hour's drive away from Rangpur city.

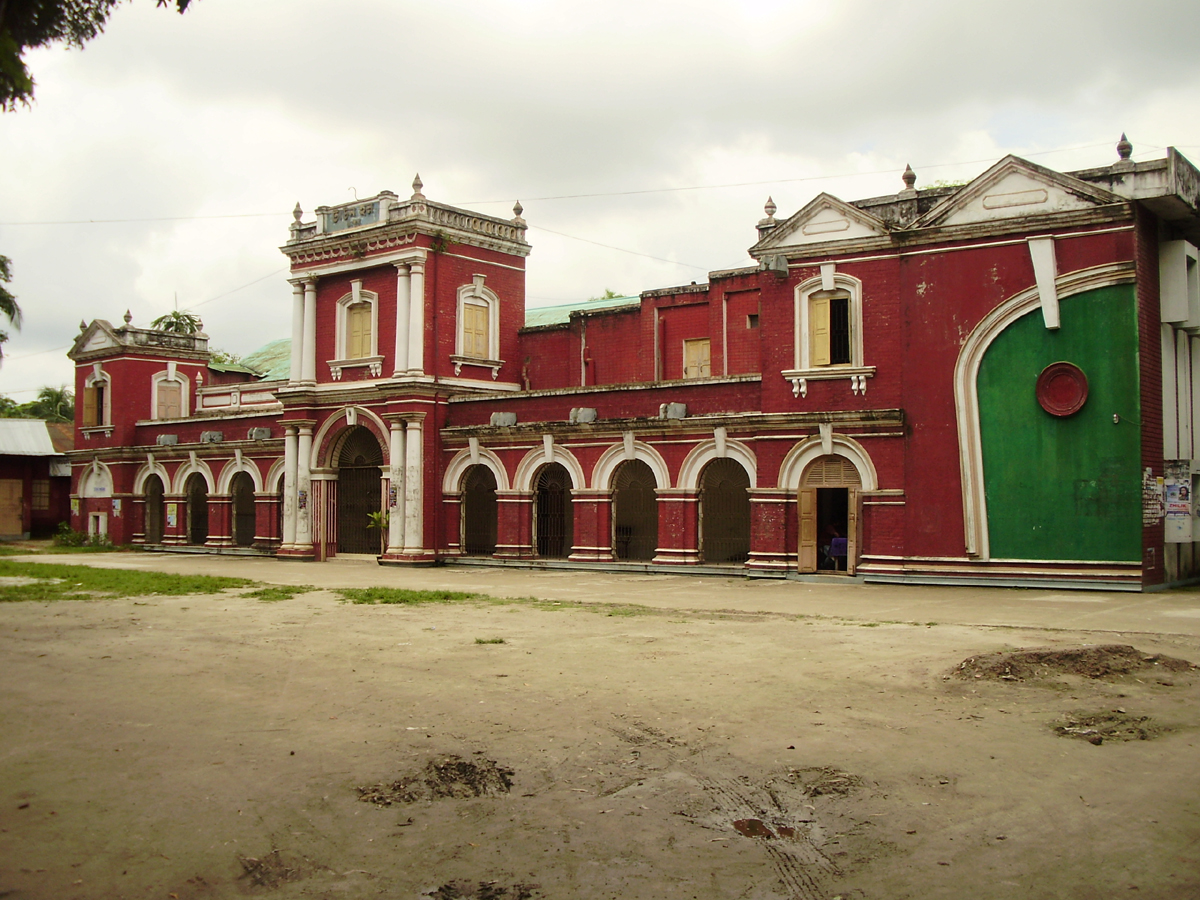
Rangpur town hall

There is an ancient auditorium named 'Town Hall' at the center of the city, where different cultural programs are held. In the great Rangpur region, no economic development took place until the 1990s, mainly because of the yearly flooding the region used to see before the making of the "Teesta Barrage."

"Bhinno Jogot" is a theme park and a picnic spot that is situated 15 kilometers from Rangpur Town.

Jadu Nibash in Radhaballav was the house of former senior minister of Bangladesh, Mashiur Rahman Jadu Mia (1924–1979).

== Transport ==
The main transportation methods here are by air, rail, or road. To travel by air, people have to first travel to Dhaka Domestic Airport and then fly to Saidpur Airport (DAC-SPD route). Seven flights travel this route daily. US-Bangla Airlines, Novoair, and Biman offer the flights. The distance by airways from Dhaka to Saidpur is 254.28 km (158 mi). By rail, the district is accessible from Kamalapur railway station which runs a daily-except-Sunday train, the "Rangpur Express", to Rangpur Railway Station. The total journey by rail is 453 km (281 mi). By road, travelers have to travel 307 km (191 mi) using the Savar-Kaliakair route or 327 km (203 mi) using the Tongi-Mawna route, Shamu.

== Education ==
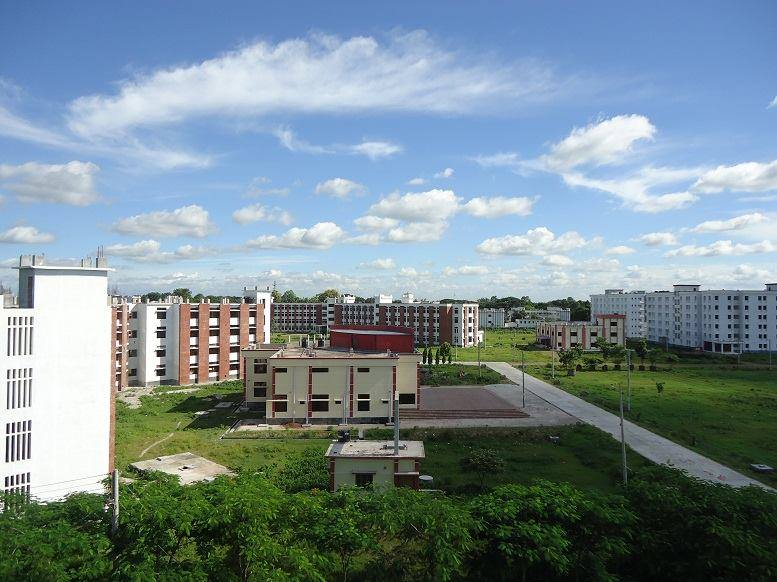
Campus of Begum Rokeya University

=== Universities ===
- Begum Rokeya University
- Teesta University

=== Medical colleges ===
- Rangpur Medical College
- Prime Medical College
- Rangpur Community Medical College

=== Colleges ===
- Carmichael College
- Rangpur Cadet College
- Police Lines School and College, Rangpur
- Cantonment Public School and College, Rangpur
- Rangpur Government College

=== Schools ===
- Rangpur Zilla School
- Police Lines School and College, Rangpur
- Cantonment Public School and College, Rangpur
- Collectorate School and College, Rangpur
- Lions School and College, Rangpur

== Media ==
Bangladesh Betar Rangpur (BBR) has a broadcasting station in Rangpur. Bangladesh Television (BTV) has a satellite station in Rangpur. The Rangpur Press Club is situated in Rangpur. Rangpur has almost 19 cinema halls. There are several locally published newspapers in the district.

== Development organisations ==
RDRS Bangladesh – previously Rangpur-Dinajpur Rural Service – has its main operational headquarters in Rangpur town at the RDRS Complex.

== Notable people ==
- K. Maudood Elahi, Bangladeshi professor and businessman
- K. Mukhtar Elahi, Bangladeshi freedom fighter
- K. Mushtaq Elahi, Bangladeshi-American freedom fighter, professor philanthropist, and scholar
- Hasan M. Elahi, Bangladeshi-American artist
- K. Manzoor Elahi, Bangladeshi freedom fighter
- K. Taufiq Elahi, Bangladeshi professor and architect
- K. Tausif Elahi, Bangladeshi youngest Astronomy Olympiad champion, Mathematics Olympiad champion, Physics Olympiad champion and Biology Olympiad first runner-up, Junior Science Olympiad national winner
- K. Iffat Elahi Mahbub, Bangladeshi murder victim
- K. Mahbub Elahi Biplob, Bangladeshi murderer
- Captain Iftekhar Elahi Shanto, Bangladeshi murderer and military officer
- Ershad Elahi Shuvo, Bangladeshi murderer
- K. Daad Elahi, Bangladeshi school principal, school inspector and politician
- William Beveridge, British economist
- Roquia Sakhawat Hussain, writer and social worker
- Mashiur Rahman Jadu Mia, former Prime Minister of Bangladesh (1979)
- Hussein Muhammad Ershad, former President of Bangladesh
- M. A. Sattar (1925–2009), chairman of Sattar Jute Mills Ltd, Minister of Jute and Textiles, 1985–1986, Minister of Labor and Manpower, 1986–1987, MP (Narayanganj-4), 1986-1990 and Chief Whip, 1988–1990
- Shawfikul Ghaani Shawpan, former Minister of Housing and Public Works
- Buddhadeb Guha, popular Bengali novels and fiction writer
- Anisul Huq, poet and writer
- Rashid Askari, Bengali-English writer, fictionist, columnist, translator, media personality, and the 12th vice-chancellor of Islamic University, Bangladesh, Bangladesh
- Rezwana Choudhury Bannya, Bangladeshi Rabindra Sangeet artist
- M. A. Wazed Miah, nuclear scientist
- Abu Sadat Mohammad Sayem, 6th President of Bangladesh, first chief justice of Bangladesh
- Sajeeb Wazed Joy, ICT consultant and political campaigner
- G M Quader, Bangladeshi politician, the former Minister of Commerce and former Minister of Civil Aviation
- Nasir Hossain, Bangladeshi all-round cricketer
- Ahmed Hossain, chairman of the Rangpur District Board and Minister for Agriculture, Forest and Fisheries (undivided Bengal)
- General Mustafizur Rahman, former Chief of Army Staff of the Bangladesh Army
- Mustafa Kamal, former Chief Justice of Bangladesh and chairman of the Law Commission of Bangladesh.
- Sharif Imam, husband of Shahid Janani Jahanara Imam
- Jahanara Imam, Bangladeshi writer and political activist
- Abbasuddin Ahmed, prominent Bhawaiya singer
- Rathindranath Roy, founder of Bhawaiya academy and singer
- Ferdausi Rahman, folk singer
- Hassan Mahmood Khandker, Bangladeshi former Inspector General of Bangladesh Police
- Mohammad Nurul Islam, former governor of Bangladesh Bank
- Mishrat Jahan Moushumi, women's footballer, Bangladesh Women's National Team
- Mosammat Sirat Jahan Shopna, women's footballer
- Akbar Ali, Bangladeshi U-19 captain
- Shantanu Moitra, score composer, musician
- H. N. Ashequr Rahman, Bangladeshi MP

=== Members of the tenth Jatiyo Sangsad ===
The members of the national parliament were:

- Rangpur-1: Mashiur Rahaman Ranga, Bangladeshi MP and Jatiya Party leader
- Rangpur-2: Abul Kalam Md. Ahasanul Hoque Chowdhury from Awami League
- Rangpur-3: Saad Ershad, from Jatiya Party
- Rangpur-4: Tipu Munshi, Minister of Commerce of Bangladesh, former president of BGMEA, Awami League politician
- Rangpur-5: H. N. Ashequr Rahman, Bangladeshi MP, Awami League, five time selected central treasurer of the Bangladesh Awami League, chairman of Meghna Bank Limited and member of the Board of Trustees, East–West University, Bangladesh
- Rangpur-6: Shirin Sharmin Chaudhury, from Awami League
