= List of people from Rangpur =

This is a list of notable people from the Rangpur City, Bangladesh.

== Presidents of Bangladesh ==
- Abu Sadat Mohammad Sayem, 6th President of Bangladesh
- Hussain Muhammad Ershad, former President of Bangladesh, founder Jatiya Party

== Chief Justices of Bangladesh ==
- Abu Sadat Mohammad Sayem, 1st chief justice of Bangladesh
- Mustafa Kamal, Chief Justice of Bangladesh

== Speakers of Parliament ==
- Shah Abdul Hamid, 1st speaker of the Constituent Assembly of Bangladesh also 1st Speaker of the Jatiya Sangsad (Parliament of Bangladesh)

== Chief Ministers ==
- Abu Hussain Sarkar, 4th Chief Minister of East Pakistan, one of the founders of United Front, founder of Bangla Academy and a Swadeshi movement revolutionary

== Civil servants ==
- Hassan Mahmood Khandker, 26th Inspector General of Bangladesh Police, He was the longest serving Inspector General in Bangladesh Police's history.

== Freedom fighters in The Liberation War ==
- Sharif Imam, husband of Shahid Janani Jahanara Imam
- K. Mukhtar Elahi, Bangladeshi freedom fighter
- K. Mushtaq Elahi, Bangladeshi-American freedom fighter, professor philanthropist, and scholar
- K. Manzoor Elahi, Bangladeshi freedom fighter

== Performing and fine arts ==
- Asaduzzaman Noor, actor, politician and activist. Former Minister of Cultural Affairs and MP, popular for his role of Baker Bhai in Kothao Keu Nei
- Abbasuddin Ahmed, Independence Day Awardee, Bhawaiya and Ghazal singer
- Debi Prasad Roy Chowdhury, sculptor
- Dipankar Dipon, film director and screenwriter who predominantly works in Dhallywood
- Ferdausi Rahman, Independence Day Awardee and Ekushey Padak winner legendary folk and playback singer
- Mashiat Rahman, actress
- Mustafa Zaman Abbasi, Ekushey Padak winner Bangladeshi musicologist
- Rathindranath Roy, founder of Bhawaiya academy and singer
- Rezwana Choudhury Bannya, Rabindra Sangeet artist
- Tulsi Lahiri, actor and dramatist
- Hasan M. Elahi, Bangladeshi-American artist

== Officers of Bangladesh Armed Forces ==
- General Mustafizur Rahman, 9th Chief of Army Staff of the Bangladesh Army
- Lieutenant General Hussain Muhammad Ershad, 4th Chief of Army Staff of the Bangladesh Army

== Politicians ==
- Mashiur Rahman Jadu Mia (Politician, Founding member of Bangladesh Nationalist Party and Senior Minister with the rank of a Prime Minister in 1979)
- Tipu Munshi, Minister of Commerce of Bangladesh, former president BGMEA, Awami League politician
- Mashiur Rahaman Ranga Bangladeshi MP and Jatiya Party leader
- M. A. Sattar, Chairman Sattar Jute Mills Ltd, Minister of Jute and Textiles, Minister of Labor and Manpower, Member of Parliament and Chief Whip
- Sharfuddin Ahmed Jhantu First Mayor of Rangpur City Corporation, Jatiya Party leader
- H. N. Ashequr Rahman, Bangladeshi MP, Awami League, Rahman is the treasurer of the Central Committee of the Bangladesh Awami League. He is the chairman of Meghna Bank Limited and member of Board of Trustees, East West university.
- K. Daad Elahi, Bangladeshi school principal, school inspector and politician

== Poet, writers and journalists ==
- Anisul Hoque, author, novelist, dramatist, and journalist
- Rashid Askari, academic, writer, fictionist, columnist, translator, media personality and the 12th vice-chancellor of Islamic University, Bangladesh
- Buddhadeb Guha, author, novelist and Bengali fiction writer
- Monajatuddin, journalist
- Rebati Mohan Dutta Choudhury, Assamese litterateur, Sahitya Akademi Award winner and an academician

== British revolutionaries ==
- Majnu Shah, leader of the Fakir-Sannyasi Rebellion. He used to operate in this region.
- Sri Aurobindo, British Indian philosopher, yogi, maharishi, poet, and nationalist. Spent his childhood here.
- Prafulla Chaki, British Indian revolutionary, famous for attempting to murder of a British official along with khudiram Bose. Studied at the Rangpur Zilla School.
- Devi Chaudhurani, revolutionary, one of the organizers of the Fakir-Sannyasi Rebellion

== Reformers and activists ==
- Begum Rokeya Shakhawat Hossain, who was most famous for her efforts on behalf of gender equality and other social issues
- Karimunnesa Khanam Chaudhurani, Bengali poet, social worker, and patron of literature
- Abu Sayed, quota reform activist who participated in the 2024 Bangladesh quota reform movement. He was shot dead by the Bangladesh Police on 16 July 2024.

== Scholars and scientists ==
- Annette Beveridge, British Indologist, known works being the translations of the Baburnama from the Turki (Turkish) language, and the Humayun-nama from Persian
- William Beveridge, British economist who wrote the Beveridge Report that influenced United Kingdom to implement welfare state policies after World War II
- M. A. Wazed Miah reputed Bangladeshi nuclear scientist who was former Chairman of the Bangladesh Atomic Energy Commission
- K. Maudood Elahi, Bangladeshi professor and businessman
- K. Taufiq Elahi, Bangladeshi professor and architect

== Sports ==
- Nasir Hossain, all-round cricketer
- Akbar ali, cricketer, World Cup winning captain of Bangladesh under-19 team in under-19 world cup 2020
- Mishrat Jahan Moushumi, Women's footballer, Bangladesh Women's National Team
- Sirat Jahan Shopna, Women's footballer, Bangladesh Women's National Team
