= Gazi Shahabuddin Ahmed =

Bangladeshi journalist

- Born: c. 1939; Dhaka, Bengal Presidency, British India
- Died: 9 June 2017 (aged 77–78); Dhaka, Bangladesh

Gazi Shahabuddin Ahmed (c. 1939 – 9 June 2017) was a Bangladeshi editor, intellectual and publisher. He was the founder and editor of Sachitra Shandhani.

== Early life and education ==
Ahmed was a descendant of Fazl Gazi, zamindar of Bhawal Estate (now Gazipur, named after the family), and one of the Baro-Bhuyan of Bengal. He was the eldest son of 11 children of Gazi Shamsuddin Ahmed, an inspector general of police, and Gazi Rafia Khatun, an entrepreneur. While studying at Notre Dame College, Dhaka, he published and edited Sachitra Shandhani in 1956, at the age of 17. The publication ran until 1996. It published notable writings including Jahanara Imam's wartime journal, Ekatturer Dinguli. His uncle Gazi Nurun Newaz was the founder and chairman of Bangladesh's first ceramic industry Peoples Ceramic Industries Limited.

== Career ==
Ahmed had a publishing house, Shondhani Prokashoni.

== Personal life ==
Ahmed was married to Bithi since 1964. Together they had a son, Shoubhro and a daughter, Sharmeen.
