= Nazmul Ahsan Kalimullah =

Professor and 4th Vice Chancellor of Begum Rokeya University, Rangpur

- নাজমুল আহসান কলিম উল্লাহ

4th Vice-chancellor of the Begum Rokeya University
- In office 1 June 2017 – 9 June 2021
- Preceded by: A. K. M. Nurun Nabi
- Succeeded by: Md. Hasibur Rashid

Personal details
- Occupation: Professor, Educator, University Administrator, election monitor

Nazmul Ahsan Kalimullah is the former vice-chancellor of Begum Rokeya University.

== Career ==
Kalimullah served as a professor of the Department of Public Administration of the Faculty of Social Sciences of the University of Dhaka.

Kalimullah as chairman of the National Election Observation Council was set to observe the 2006 election, where he raised questions about the voter list.

Kalimullah is the chairperson of Jatiya Nirbachon Parjabekkhon Parishad, also known as JANIPOP, an election monitoring group.

On 1 June 2017, Kalimullah was appointed vice chancellor of Begum Rokeya University, Rangpur. His term as vice chancellor was controversial, and teachers at the university campaigned for his removal. He was allegedly absent from campus 478 days out of 631 days.

Kalimullah was awarded the rank of major by the Bangladesh National Cadet Corps. He is a former editor of The Asian Age.

The Bangladesh Nationalist Party opposed his appointment as an observer for the 2018 general election as they alleged he had links to a particular party and pointed out that his uncle, Mohiuddin Khan Alamgir, was a minister of the Awami League government. Kalimullah generated some controversy after taking an online class at 3:20 am. On 13 March 2021, a group of teachers at the university published a 790-page report on corruption by Kalimullah at a press conference. The University Grants Commission, in an investigation, found irregularities against Kalimullah and called for action against him. He challenged the probe in court unsuccessfully. In March 2021, the local unit of Bangabandhu Parishad declared him unwanted on the university campus. On 9 June 2021, Kalimullah was replaced by Md. Hasibur Rashid as vice chancellor of Begum Rokeya University, Rangpur, at the end of his four-year term.
