= Bangladesh Biology Olympiad =

Annual biological competition in Bangladesh

- Start Date: 2015
- Country: Bangladesh
- Website: bdbo.org

The Bangladesh Biology Olympiad (BdBO) is an annual biological competition arranged for school and college students of Bangladesh to encourage their interest and capabilities for biology. Bangladesh Biology activities started in 2015 formally.

== Format ==
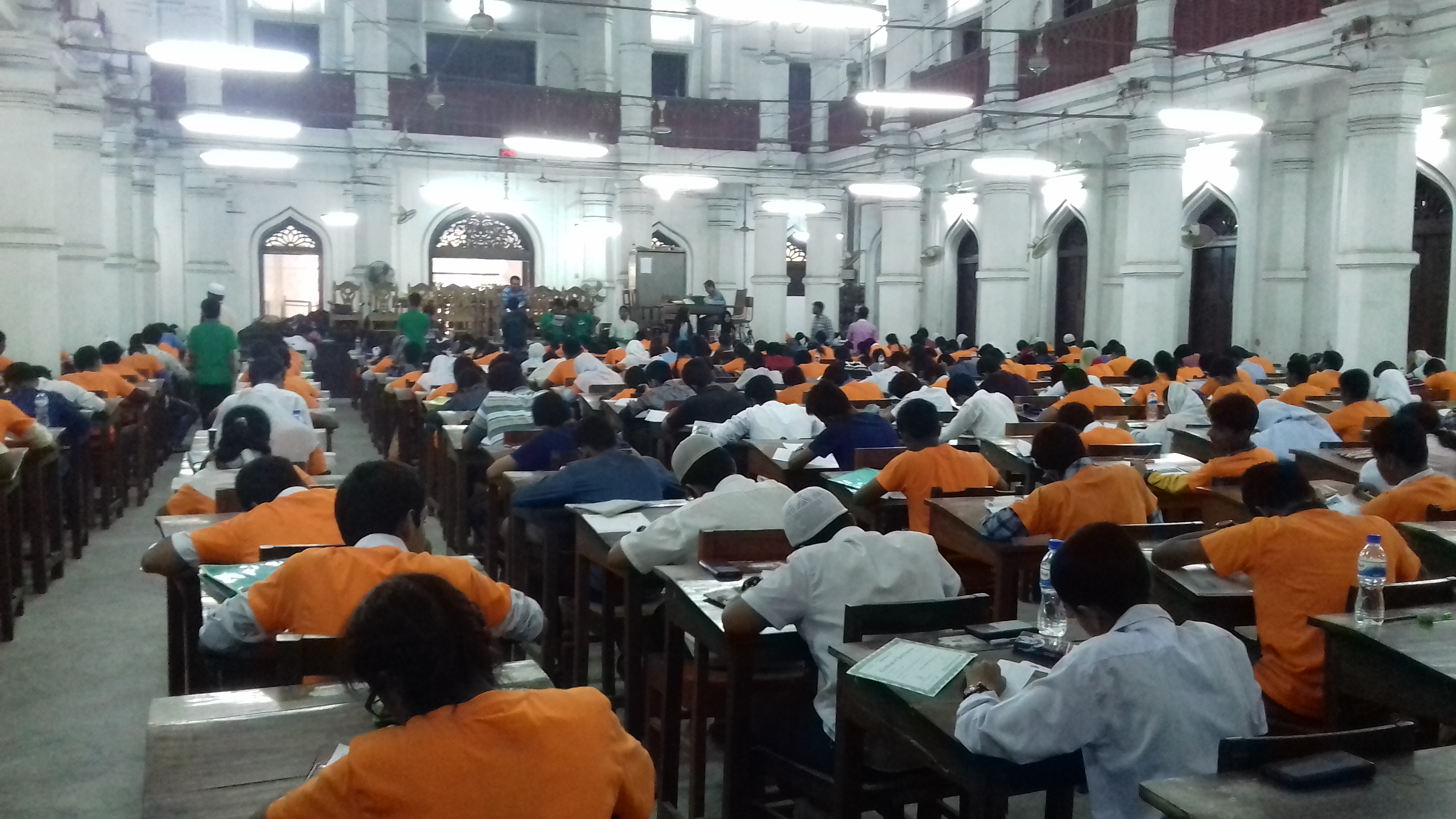
Bangladesh Biology Olympiad national round in Curzon Hall, DU

The first round is the regional round which is open for all Bangladeshi students above class six. Winners from the regional round participates in the national round. The winners from the national round are trained in a camp where the representatives for International Biology Olympiad are selected.

== Committees ==
The central committee of Bangladesh Biology Olympiad consists of Dr. Rakha Hari Sarkar, Dr. Bidhan Ranjan Roy Poddar, Dr. A. K. M. Jakir Hussain, Dr. Mrittunjoy Kundu, Dr. Nitya Ranjan Paul, Dr. Md Habibur Rahman, Dr. Shoumitra Chakravarty, Dr. Samiul Alam, Rafikul Islam, Dr. Tariq Arafat, Aniruddha Pramanik among other members and general secretaries of all regions.

== Achievements at IBO ==
Till the year 2026, Bangladesh has won a total of 16 bronze medals and 7 honourable mentions.

=== 2015 ===
Bangladesh was an observer country at the 26th International Biology Olympiad.

=== 2016 ===
The representatives of Bangladesh were Ayman Wadud (St. Joseph Higher Secondary School), Wasique Hasan (Mastermind English Medium School), Maisha Munawwara Prome (Oxford International School) and Wasee Rahman Chowdhury (Scholastica). Maisha Munawwara Prome and Wasique Hasan won honourable mentions.

=== 2017 ===
Representatives this year were Nafeez Ishmam Ahmaed (SFX Greenherald International School), Md Bayezid Mia (Turkish Hope International School), Maisha M Prome (Oxford International School) and Nazmus Sadaat (Mangrove International School). Bangladesh secured two honourable mentions.

=== 2018 ===
Representatives of this year were Auddithio Nag, Prokriti Projukti, Md Bayezid Mia and Md Tamzid Hossain Tanim. Auddithio Nag won a bronze medal.

=== 2019 ===
Representatives this year were Auddithio Nag, Madhav Vadhyan Sankaran, Rafsan Rahman Raayan and Ahnaf Tahmidur Rahman. Auddithio Nag, Madhav Vadhyan Sankaran and Rafsan Rahman Raayan won bronze medals.

=== 2020 ===
Representatives this year were Tasnim Binte Zulfiqar, Rafsan Rahman Raayan, Raad Sharar and Abrar Jamil. Rafsan Rahman Raayan and Raad Sharar won bronze medals.

=== 2021 ===
Representatives this year were A. S. M. Abrar Tushar (Notre Dame College), Raad Sharar (Rajshahi College), Rayan Rahman (SFX Greenherald International School) and Tasnim Zulfiqar (SFX Greenherald International School). Tasnim Zulfiqar and Raad Sharar won bronze medals and A. S. M. Abrar Tushar and Rayan Rahman won honourable mentions.

=== 2022 ===
Representatives this year were Rayan Rahman (SFX Greenherald International School), Fayyad Ahmed (Scholastica), Khundkar Ishraq Ahammad (Notre Dame College) and Tahseen Shaan Leon (Alfred International School and College). Rayan Rahman, Fayyad Ahmed, Khundkar Ishraq Ahammad and Tahseen Shaan won bronze medals.

=== 2023 ===
Representatives this year were Fayyad Ahmmed (Scholastica), Fayez Ahmed (Rajshahi Government Laboratory High School), Ahammad Naim (Dhaka City College) and Aariz Anas (South Point School and College). Fayyad Ahmmed, Fayez Ahmad and Ahammad Naim won bronze medals and Aariz Anas won honourable mention.

=== 2024 ===
Fayez Ahmed (Rajshahi Government Laboratory High School and College) won a bronze medal.

=== 2025 ===
Representatives this year were Aariz Anas (South Point School and College), Farbeed bin Faisal (Mastermind English Medium School), Ha-mim Rahman (Notre Dame College) and Marjan Afrose Opshora (Rajuk Uttara Model College).

=== 2026 ===
Representatives this year were Mohammad Saifan Haider (St. Joseph International School), Md Yasin (Govt. Syed Hatem Ali College), Nashwan Haque Mahir (Dhaka Residential Model College) and Raktim Chakraborty (Mymensingh International School).

== See also ==
- Bangladesh Mathematical Olympiad
- Bangladesh Physics Olympiad
