= Begum Rokeya University, Rangpur =

Public university in Rangpur, Bangladesh

- বেগম রোকেয়া বিশ্ববিদ্যালয়,রংপুর
- Former name: Rangpur University
- Motto: জ্ঞানই শক্তি
- Motto in English: Knowledge is Power
- Type: Public
- Established: October 12, 2008; 18 years ago
- Budget: ৳ 71.44 cr (2024-25)
- Chancellor: President Mirza Fakhrul Islam Alamgir
- Vice-Chancellor: Md. Showkat Ali
- Faculty: 199
- Administrative staff: 131
- Students: 7,050
- Undergraduates: 5,982
- Postgraduates: 1,068
- Location: Rangpur, Bangladesh; 25.7179°N 89.2592°E
- Campus: 75 acres (30 ha); Urban
- Language: Bengali, English
- Affiliations: University Grants Commission of Bangladesh
- Website: brur.ac.bd

Begum Rokeya University, Rangpur (Bengali: বেগম রোকেয়া বিশ্ববিদ্যালয়, রংপুর) (abbreviated as BRUR), formerly Rangpur University, is a public research university in Rangpur, Bangladesh. Founded in 2008, it is the only generally categorized university in Rangpur Division and the second public university in the region. It was named after the feminist writer and social worker Begum Rokeya.

== Campus ==
The university is between Rangpur Cadet College and Carmichael College in Rangpur. It covers an area of 75 acres (30 ha). The university has constructed four academic buildings and started classes in August 2011 on the main campus. Currently, the university has 22 departments and almost 7,000 students. It contains three student halls (two male and one female). There is a library and a cafeteria on the campus.

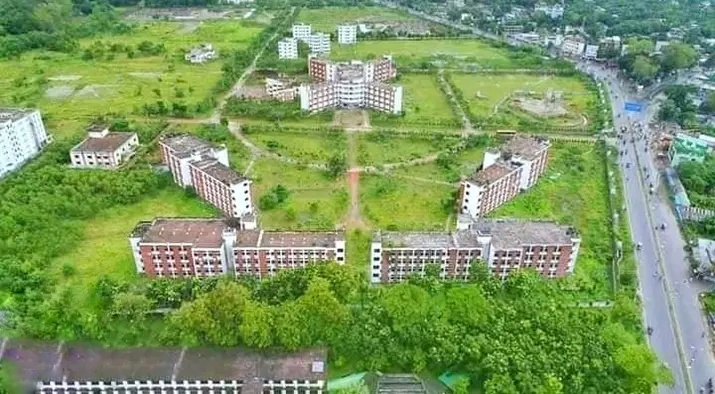
Bird's-eye view of BRUR

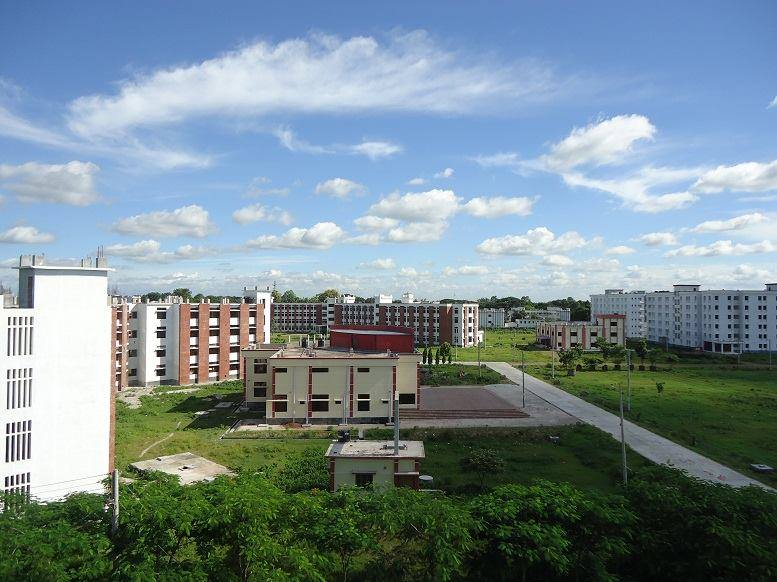
Rear View of Campus, Begum Rokeya University, Rangpur

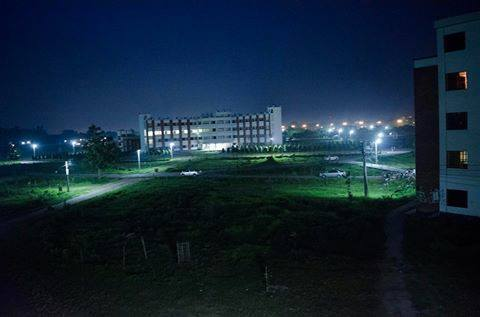
Campus of Begum Rokeya University at Night, Rangpur

== History ==
In August 2007, Fakhruddin Ahmed, chief advisor of the caretaker government, agreed in principle to establish a full-fledged university in Rangpur. Fakhruddin Ahmad, in a historic cabinet meeting held in Rangpur on 2 February 2008, decided to establish a university in Rangpur. The Rangpur University Ordinance was approved by the cabinet on 15 June 2008. M. Lutfar Rahman was appointed the first vice-chancellor on 20 October 2008. Two days later, Hossain Zillur Rahman, the then education and commerce advisor to the caretaker government, formally inaugurated the university. The permanent campus of Begum Rokeya University was established on land acquired from Carmichael College.

== Administration ==
- Vice-Chancellor (VC): Md. Showkat Ali
- Pro Vice-Chancellor: Sarifa Salowa Dina
- Treasurer: Mojib Uddin Ahmed

=== Administrative officers ===
- Registrar: Engr. Md. Alamgir Chowdhury
- Assistant Registrar: Md. Khairul Islam
- Proctor: Md. Ferdous Rahman
- Provosts:
  - MD. Amir Sharif, Bijoy-24 Hall
  - Shafiqur Rahman, Sohid Mukhtar Elahi Hall

== Academics ==
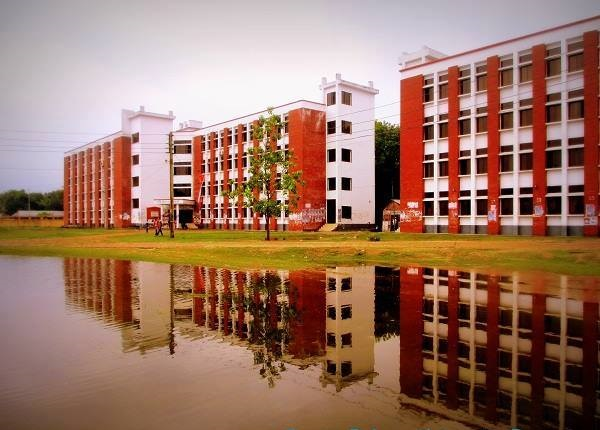
Academic Building 1 & 2 of Begum Rokeya University, Rangpur

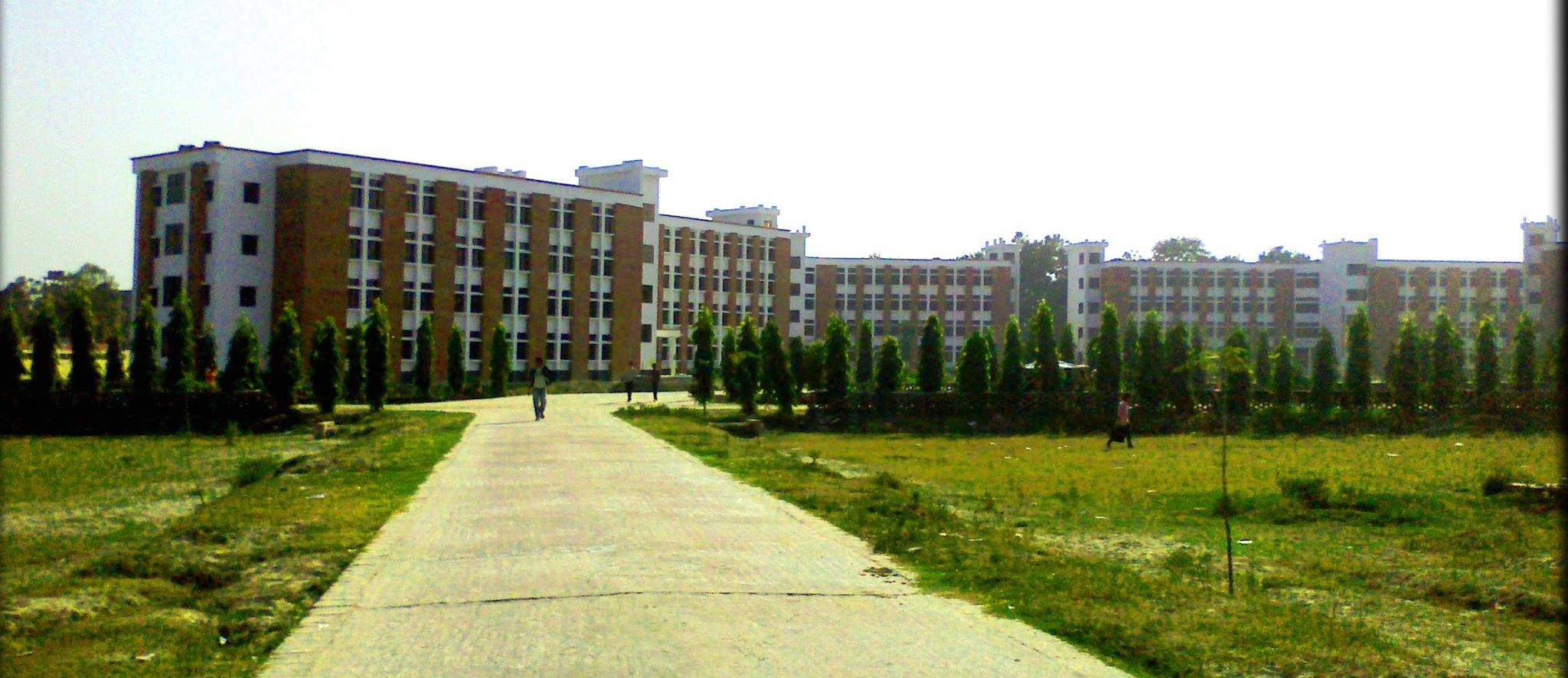
Academic Buildings of Begum Rokeya University, Rangpur

=== Undergraduate programs ===
- BSc (Engineering)
- BSc (Hons.)
- B.A. (Hons.)
- B.B.A. (Hons.)
- B.S.S. (Hons.)

=== Graduate programs ===
- MSc (Engineering)
- MSc
- M.A.
- M.B.A.
- M.S.S.

=== Post Graduate programs ===
- MPhil (MPhil leading to PhD)
- PhD

=== Other programs ===
- M.B.A. (Evening)

=== Faculties and departments ===
BRUR has 22 departments under six faculties.

Faculty	Department
Faculty of Arts	Bangla
Faculty of Arts	English
Faculty of Arts	History and Archaeology
Faculty of Social Science	Economics
Faculty of Social Science	Sociology
Faculty of Social Science	Political Science
Faculty of Social Science	Gender and Development Studies
Faculty of Social Science	Mass Communication and Journalism
Faculty of Social Science	Public Administration
Faculty of Business Studies	Accounting and Information Systems
Faculty of Business Studies	Management Studies
Faculty of Business Studies	Marketing
Faculty of Business Studies	Finance and Banking
Faculty of Business Studies	Management Information Systems
Faculty of Science	Mathematics
Faculty of Science	Statistics
Faculty of Science	Physics
Faculty of Science	Chemistry
Faculty of Engineering & Technology	Computer Science and Engineering
Faculty of Engineering & Technology	Electrical and Electronic Engineering
Faculty of Life and Earth Sciences	Geography and Environmental Science
Faculty of Life and Earth Sciences	Disaster Management

=== Admission ===
BRUR enrolls undergraduate students. Students who want to get admitted need to pass and compete on the merit list in the admission test which is highly competitive. Admission tests are arranged by the university under the authority of the admission council for all faculties.

Statistics based on academic year 2014–15 admission:

- Total applicants: 90,402
- Total seats available: 1,258
- Average applicant-to-seat ratio: 72:1.
- Acceptance rate: 1.39%

== Central Library and Information Center ==
The Central Library and Information Center (CLIC) of Begum Rokeya University was established on 12 October 2008 to support the instructional and research programs of the university. The vice-chancellor opened all activities of CLIC on 19 November 2009.

Initially, CLIC started functioning at the temporary campus of the university (Teachers' Training College, Rangpur). It was shifted to the permanent campus on 19 March 2011. This library and information center has large reading rooms with huge resources such as books, journals, periodicals, etc. The director is Porimol Chandra Barman.

== Institute ==
Dr. Wazed Research and Training Institute. MPhil & PhD degrees are offered at this institute. The institute is one of the few institutes exclusively designed for MPhil and PhD programs in the country. It also offers an MPhil leading to a PhD.

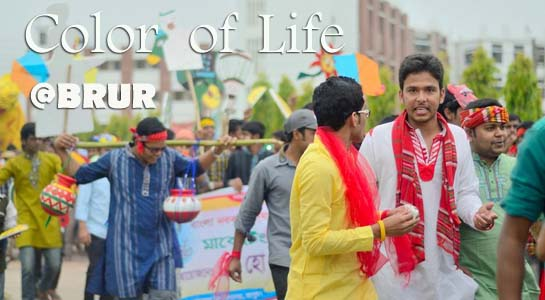
Bengali New Year Celebration at Begum Rokeya University, Rangpur

== Residential halls ==
=== For male students ===
- Bijoy 24 Hall
- Shahid Mukhtar Elahi Hall

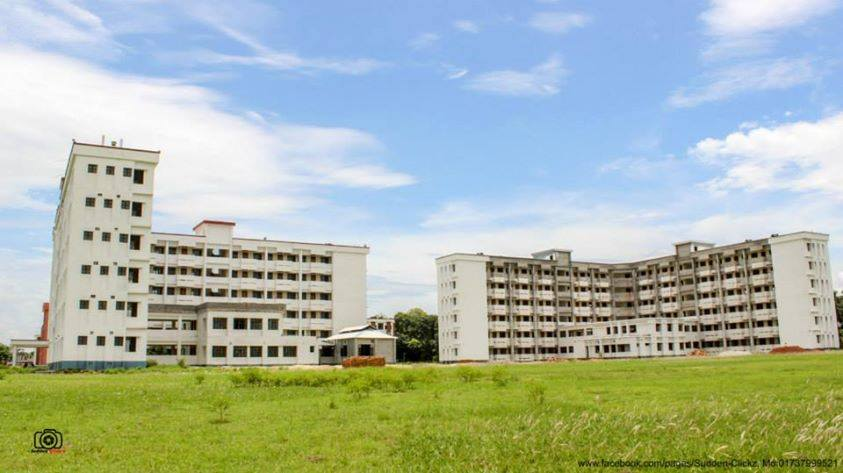
Male Student Halls of Begum Rokeya University, Rangpur

=== For female students ===
- Shahid Felani Hall
- Sheikh Hasina Hall (under construction)

== Infrastructure ==
=== Monuments ===
- Liberation Monument
- Sohid Minar

=== Academic ===
- Four academic buildings
- Central Library
- Dr. Wazed Research and Training Institute (DWRTI)

=== Administration ===
- Administrative Building

== Facilities ==
- In-campus medical facilities
- Own bus transportation service
- Central Library with Computer lab & seminar libraries in departments
- Cafeteria
- Central Mosque & temple
- Cyber Center

== List of vice-chancellors ==
Name	From	To
M. Lutfar Rahman	20 October 2008	7 May 2009
Mohammad Abdul Jalil Miah	7 May 2009	5 May 2013
A. K. M. Nurun Nabi	6 May 2013	5 May 2017
Nazmul Ahsan Kalimullah	1 June 2017	9 June 2021
Md. Hasibur Rashid	9 June 2021	10 August 2024
Md. Showkat Ali	18 September 2024	Present

== Scholarships ==
Multiple scholarships are offered in the university. Notable among them are the DUPDA scholarship and the Dr. Sharif Mustaque Memorial Financial Aid. Among external scholarship programs, the one with the most extensive coverage is K Mushtaq and Hasna Elahi Foundation
