= Mastermind School =

Coordinates: 23.7517°N 90.3758°E

Mastermind English Medium School
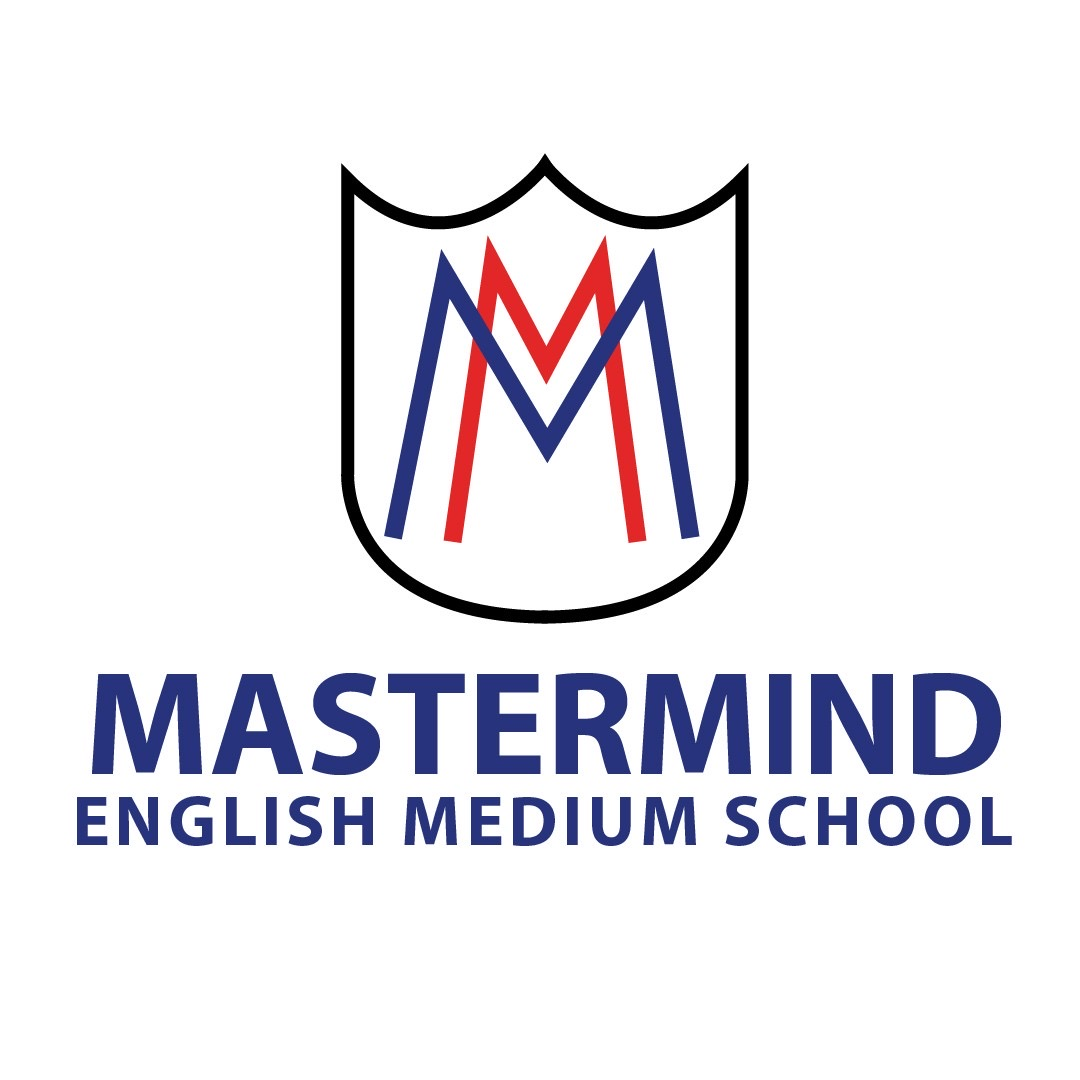
- House # 05, Road # 12 (New), Dhanmondi, Dhaka-1209; Bangladesh

Information
- Type: Private
- Established: 1997
- Principal: Syed Fakhruddin Ahmed
- Grades: PG to 2 (Primary School); 3 to 5 (Junior School); 6 to 12 (Senior School)
- Colors: Blue and Red
- Nickname: Mavericks
- Website: mastermindschool.org

Mastermind English Medium School is a British-curriculum based private school in Bangladesh established in 1997. It offers English-medium education to students from PG (Playgroup) to grade 12, leading to the O & A Level qualifications (under Edexcel or Cambridge)

The main campus is located in Dhanmondi, with a second branch in Uttara.

The school's principal, Syed Fakruddin Ahmed, had doubled as the school's senior physics teacher in the previous years. The school consists of over 3000 students and 500 teaching staff.

The institute had won "The Most Versatile School" awards in 2011 and 2015, and was crowned Champion of the junior category at the Biotechnology Fest in 2015, Hosted by City Montessori School, in Lucknow, India.

The school provides extra-curricular activities including debate, MUN, community service, and sports. The school clubs are run by an executive committee, selected for each club.

Every year the Mastermind Community Service Club takes part in charitable works, including charity food sales, paying visits at Ashiq Foundation (a rehabilitation centre for under-privileged cancer-affected children), collection of winter clothes for charity distribution, blood donation camps and art competition for children diagnosed with autism.

== Controversies ==
The school was accused by the newspaper Daily Star of excessive use of corporal punishment. In April 2011, then vice-principal Neera Habib was said to have physically assaulted seven students for protesting against the expulsion of their friends. The vice principal was also said to have assaulted other students previously for straying off of the strict dress code. She was later fired without an official announcement from the school itself. Ahmede Hussain, then an English teacher at this school and affiliated with the Daily Star newspaper, left Mastermind after the publication of this news. The school is also accused of beating and bullying students.

== Admission ==
A nominal, non-refundable application fee of BDT 500/- is payable at the time of form collection. The Admission Office reviews applications based on a specified deadline or subject to seat availability. Once the application is reviewed, parents will be notified of an assessment date for their child, who will be required to sit for an admission test. Candidates meeting the criteria will be invited for an interview with the Vice Principal or the relevant department head, arranged by their Admission team.
