= Shafi Imam Rumi =

Bangladeshi fighter (1952–1971)

Shafi Imam Rumi Bir Bikrom
- শাফি ইমাম রুমী
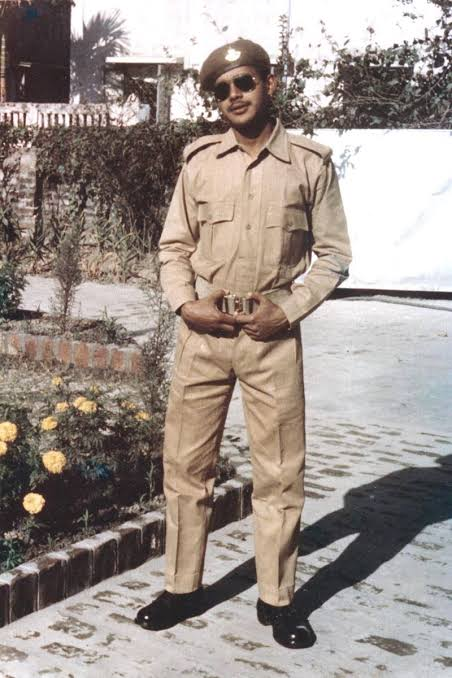
- Cadet Sergeant Shafi Imam Rumi Bir Bikrom in his BNCC then UOTC uniform
- Born: 29 March 1951; Sylhet, East Bengal, Pakistan
- Died: 30 September 1971 (aged 20); Dhaka, Bangladesh
- Alma mater: Ahsanullah Engineering College (now BUET)
- Military career
- Allegiance: Pakistan (until March 1971); Bangladesh (from March 1971)
- Branch: BNCC
- Service years: 1968-1971
- Rank: Cadet Sergeant
- Unit: Crack Platoon
- Conflicts: Bangladesh War of Independence
- Awards: Bir Bikrom

Shafi Imam Rumi (29 March 1951 – 30 September 1971) was a guerrilla fighter in the Bangladesh Liberation War. He was the eldest son of Sharif and Jahanara Imam, the latter of whom wrote about Rumi's experiences and daily life in her memoir about the war, Ekattorer Dingulee.

== Early life ==
Rumi was born on 29 March 1951 to Jahanara and Sharif Imam in an upper-middle-class family. He began his education at a local kindergarten in Azimpur and later attended St. Gregory's High School and College, where he passed his matriculation in 1968, securing third place in the Pakistan Education Board rankings. During his college years, Rumi joined the University Officers' Training Corps (now Bangladesh National Cadet Corps) along with his friends, and was later promoted to the rank of cadet sergeant. By March 1971, he had completed his Higher Secondary Certificate (HSC) at Dhaka College and was admitted to Ahsanullah Engineering College (currently Bangladesh University of Engineering and Technology). He was also enrolled in the Illinois Institute of Technology but did not attend due to the outbreak of the war.

== Bangladesh Liberation War ==
We are fighting a just war. We shall win. Pray for us all. I don't know what to write... there is so much to write about. But every tale of atrocity you hear, every picture of the terrible destruction that you see is true. They have torn into us with a savagery unparalleled in human history. And sure as Newton was right, so shall we too tear into them with like ferocity. Already our war is far advanced. When the monsoons come we shall intensify our operation.

— Shafi Imam Rumi in a letter to Syed Mostafa Kamal Pasha, his uncle

During the early months of the war, Rumi repeatedly sought his mother's permission to attend the war. She finally agreed on 19 April 1971. On 2 May, Rumi made his first attempt to cross the border into India, but had to return due to unfavorable conditions. He succeeded on his second attempt and received military training at Melaghar in Agartala, under Sector 2. This sector was overall supervised by Khaled Mosharraf and A.T.M. Haider.

After completing his training, Rumi returned to Dhaka to join the Crack Platoon, a guerrilla unit that conducted operations against the Pakistan Army. One of his primary missions was to bomb the Siddhirganj Power Station. He participated in several hit-and-run attacks, including an assault on police guards outside a house on Dhanmondi Road 18, which led to his capture, detention, and eventual execution.

During the Dhanmondi operation, Rumi and his comrades ambushed Pakistani forces from the rear window of a black Morris Oxford, killing several soldiers before successfully escaping. The operation was applauded by local residents.

== Arrest by Pakistan Army and aftermath ==
After his operation, Rumi became an icon to his fellow soldiers. On the night of 29 August, he stayed at home—unaware that the Pakistan Army had obtained information about the guerrilla fighters from an unknown source. That night, soldiers led by Captain Quayyum arrested Rumi, his father, younger brother, and a cousin.

They were first taken to the intersection of Mirpur Road and Elephant Road, where intelligence officers identified them by shining headlights on their faces. Rumi was singled out and placed in a military vehicle, while Sharif and the other detained family members were made to follow in their own car. Despite being captive, Sharif was ordered to drive and follow the military convoy. He was accompanied by two armed military personnel.

In detention, Rumi later told his father that the vehicle he was taken in was filled with fellow freedom fighters—many of whom had fought alongside him just days before. From Elephant Road they were taken to Ramna Police Station for further identification and then taken to Dhaka Cantonment. Once again, Sharif was forced to drive as part of the convoy.

At the cantonment, Rumi and his comrades endured brutal torture. They were confined in a small room, possibly inside or near a hostel, where they met other prisoners, including the artist Altaf Mahmud and freedom fighters Azad and Jewel. Speaking to his father, Rumi revealed that the army was already aware of his operations, and that it wouldn't matter if they confessed or not. He urged Sharif and Jami to maintain that their family had no knowledge of his activities.

Rumi's cousin was released on 2 September after producing a bus ticket that proved he was not a permanent resident of the house. Sharif and Jami were freed two days later, on 4 September, physically battered from torture. Despite his injuries, Sharif drove back to their home on Elephant Road. They returned back with tales of torture.

Rumi, along with Bodi, Jewel, and the others, was never seen again. It is widely believed they were among the countless victims executed by the military junta. Some sources claim that a number of captured freedom fighters, including Rumi, were executed at midnight on 4 September. One of their comrades, Chullu, was imprisoned in Dhaka Central Jail but was later rescued by Sector 2 freedom fighters after Dhaka fell to the Allied Forces on 16 December.

The mass arrests of 29 August dealt a severe blow to Mukti Bahini's guerrilla operations in Dhaka. With many of its key operatives either captured or killed, the movement suffered a temporary setback. However, despite reduced supplies from Sector 2 commander Major Khaled Mosharraf—due to escalating frontier conflicts—guerrilla attacks resumed by late September. Bombings and strikes on military targets intensified, continuing until Pakistan's eventual surrender in December.

On 5 September 1971, as the President of Pakistan Yahya Khan was set to announce a mass amnesty, some urged Rumi's family to submit a mercy petition. After careful consideration, his parents refused, believing it would dishonor Rumi's ideals and sacrifice.

Rumi's father, Sharif Imam, suffered a heart attack on 13 December. He was rushed to IPGMR (now Bangladesh Medical University), but due to a blackout caused by the ongoing Indo-Pakistani War, doctors were unable to use the defibrillator. He died late that night.

== Verdict for killing Rumi ==
On 18 July 2013, Ali Ahsan Mohammad Mojaheed was found guilty and sentenced to life imprisonment for his involvement in the killing of Rumi, along with Badi, Jewel, Azad, and Altaf Mahmud, at an army camp in Nakhalpara, Dhaka, during the Liberation War. He was later executed on 22 November 2015.

== In popular culture ==
In 2022, a fictionalized version of Rumi was portrayed in Jo Bichar Gaye, a period drama series about the Bangladesh Liberation War. The series was created by Pakistan's Geo Entertainment. The character was played by Wahaj Ali.
