= Md. Hasibur Rashid =

Bangladesh professor

- মোহাম্মদ হাসিবুর রশীদ

5th Vice-Chancellor of the Begum Rokeya University
- In office 14 June 2020 – 10 August 2024
- Preceded by: Nazmul Ahsan Kalimullah
- Succeeded by: Md. Showkat Ali

Personal details
- Born: Ishwardi, Pabna, Bangladesh
- Spouse: Rehana Begum
- Children: Hymonty Hasib
- Education: University of Dhaka, Western Michigan University, United States, University of Bath, United Kingdom
- Occupation: Professor, teacher, university administrator

Md. Hasibur Rashid is a Bangladeshi professor at the Department of Management Information Systems, Dhaka University and Head of the Department of MIS, Begum Rokeya University. He was the fifth Vice-Chancellor of Begum Rokeya University, Rangpur (BRUR). Prior to this position, he served as the University's second treasurer.

== Early life and education ==
Rashid was born in Rahimpur, Ishwardi Upazila, Pabna District. He completed his S.S.C. from S. M. High School and H.S.C. from Ishwardi Government College in 1970 and 1972, respectively. He completed his bachelor's and master's degrees in management from the University of Dhaka in 1976 and 1977, respectively.

Rashid completed an MBA from Western Michigan University in 1988. He completed a Master's in Philosophy from the University of Bath in 1996. He finished his PhD from the University of Dhaka in 2010.

== Career ==
Rashid has been teaching in the management department of Dhaka University for a long time. He worked as an Associate Professor in the Department of Management, the University of Dhaka, from 31 October 1986, to 28 September 2000. He was promoted to professor in the department in 2000. Since 2005, he has been teaching in the newly established Department of Management Information Systems at the same university. In 2020, he was appointed as the second treasurer of Begum Rokeya University, Rangpur (BRUR).

Rashid was appointed as the Vice-Chancellor of BRUR for the next four years on 9 June 2021, and the appointment will be effective from 14 June, according to the official notification. On 14 June 2021, Rashid took over as the fifth Vice-Chancellor of the Begum Rokeya University, Rangpur, from Professor Nazmul Ahsan Kalimullah. On 23 November 2021, he cancelled the University's winter holidays.

In June 2025, an arrest warrant was issued against Rashid over the death of Abu Sayeed in a protest against former Prime Minister Sheikh Hasina in police firing. He was sentenced to 10 years imprisonment in the case. He was detained and sent to jail in May 2026.
