= Government Teachers' Training College, Rangpur =

Bangladeshi teachers' training college

Coordinates: 25.7574°N 89.2363°E

- সরকারি টিচার্স ট্রেনিং কলেজ, রংপুর
- Other names: TT College, Rangpur TTC, TTCR, RTTC, TTC Rangpur, TTC
- Type: Teachers' Training College, University College, Undergraduate College, Post-graduation College
- Established: 1882
- Affiliations: National University, Bangladesh
- Location: DC residence road, Rangpur, Rangpur, Rangpur Division, 5404, Bangladesh
- Principal: Professor Md Amzad Hossain
- Vice-Principal: Professor Golam Ahmed Faruque
- Website: ttc.rangpur.gov.bd

Teachers' Training College, Rangpur, is one of the oldest teachers’ training colleges in Bangladesh. There are total fourteen teachers’ training colleges in Bangladesh located in the main cities. All the colleges are financed by the Ministry of Education of the government of Bangladesh. Teachers’ Training College, Rangpur was established in the year 1882. It is located in one of the divisional cities of Bangladesh, Rangpur. It is 350 kilometers away from the capital city, Dhaka. This is a training institute for the teachers of secondary level school teachers. Teachers come here for their professional development.

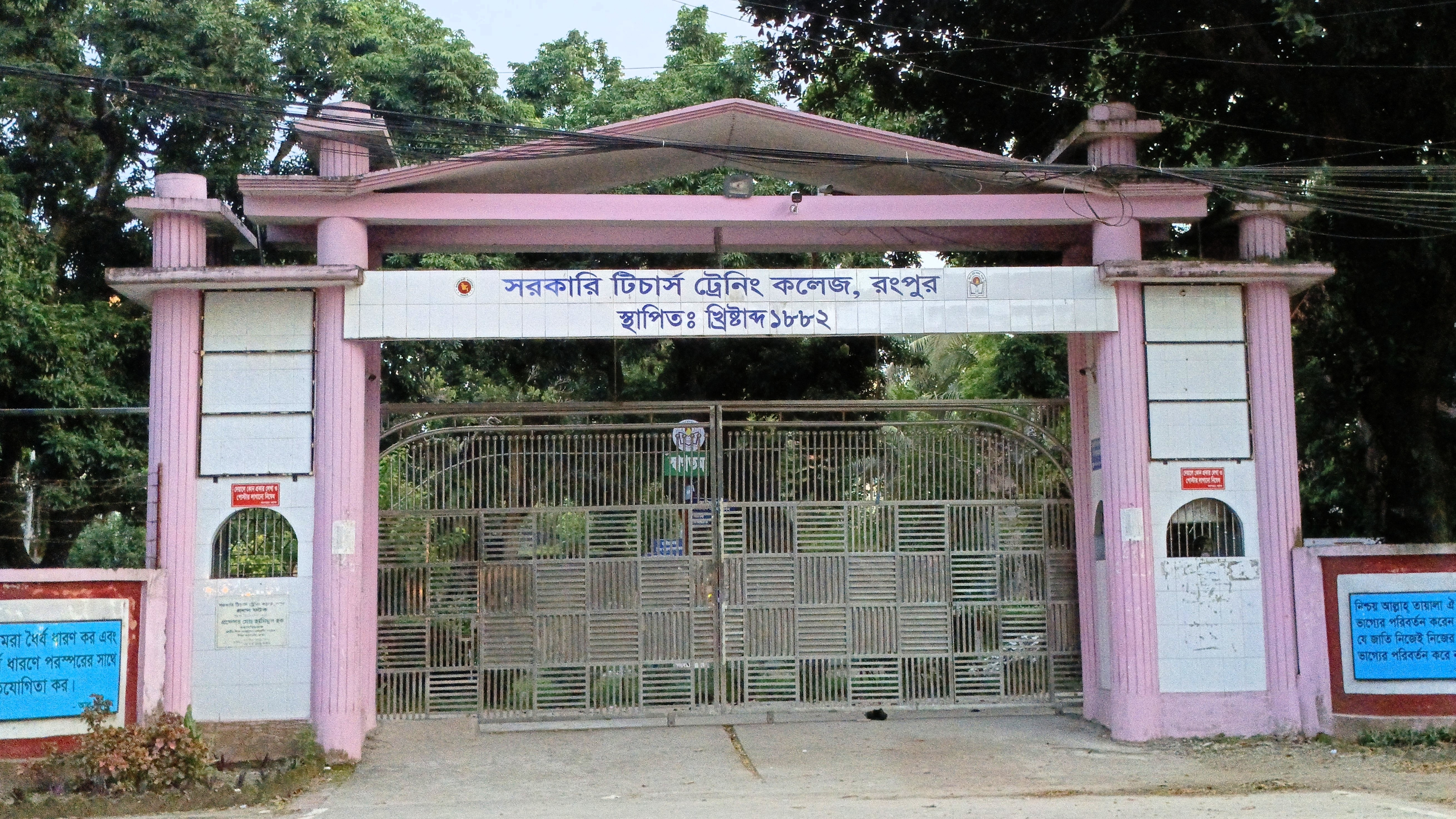
Teachers' Training College, Rangpur

== Courses taught ==
Three courses are taught in this college e.g. Bachelor of Education (one year course), Master of Education (one year course) and four years long Bachelor of Education (Honors) course. Besides these courses some of the training programs are run in the college on regular basis.

== Teachers and staff ==
All the faculty members teach here are highly qualified and recruited through Bangladesh Civil Service (BCS) examination conducted by the Bangladesh Public Service Commission (PSC). Faculty members are trained in pedagogy from over the world. There are the post of Principal, Vice Principal, Head Clerck, Office Assistant, MLSS to run the administration. The present Principal (Administrative Head) is Professor Hamidul Haque and Vice Principal is Associate Professor Ms. Akhter Banu. There are total 35 teachers and 50 office staff in this educational institute.

== Students ==
As this is a training institute for the teachers and aspiring teachers, all the students are adult and their average age is between 19 and 50 years. They come from the surrounding districts of Rangpur. The catchment area for this college is the northern six districts (Dinajpur, Thakurgaon, Kurigram, Nilphamari, Gaibandha and Panchagarh). Most of the students are graduate from different universities of the country. There are some in-service teachers also who get admit in this college for their professional degree. The number of running students is near to five hundred every year.

== Financing organization ==
The government of Bangladesh finances all the teachers’ training colleges through Ministry of Education. Every year budget allocation is sent to the district accounts office and they disburse the money. There are always some educational development projects based in this college. Teaching Quality Improvement in Secondary Education Project (TQI-SEP) is one of the leading projects that work for the teachers’ training in secondary education.
