= Ekattorer Dingulee =

Autobiography

- Author: Jahanara Imam
- Translator: Mustafizur Rahman
- Cover artist: Qayyum Chowdhury
- Language: Bengali
- Subject: Memoir
- Genre: Non-Fiction
- Publisher: Shandhani Prakashani and Charulipi Prakashani
- Publication date: February 1986
- Publication place: Bangladesh
- Pages: 268 (Shandhani Prakashan) 311 (Charulipi Prakashani) (Both differ)
- ISBN: 984-480-000-5
- OCLC: 417202076

Ekattorer Dingulee (Bengali: একাত্তরের দিনগুলি, English: The Days of 71) is an autobiography by martyr-mother Jahanara Imam based on her experiences of the liberation war of Bangladesh in 1971.

Jahanara Imam's son Shafi Imam Rumi, a student, fought the Pakistani army in Dhaka and urban regions. This book describes Jahanara's daily life as well as a description of the horrors associated with the Liberation War, including the deaths of her son and husband during the conflict.

Jahanara's book describes her son Rumi as a brilliant student. He had planned to go abroad to earn a degree in engineering, but the war broke out in March 1971 and he became a volunteer for the "Mukti Bahini" (Freedom Fighters). During the war, he was taken from his home in the middle of the night by Pakistani soldiers and never returned.

Jahanara's husband Sharif Imam was a civil engineer. Sharif had a heart attack, but the war created a blackout, and critical medical equipment could not be turned on. As a result, he died.

Jahanara survived the war and Bangladesh achieved Independence in December 1971. For the remainder of her life, she lived with her surviving son. She received many awards for her books and she created a committee later on to catch the traitors during the war and hand them to the Government of Bangladesh.
