= K. Taufiq Elahi =

Bangladeshi architect and academic

Professor K. Taufiq Elahi
- কে. তৌফিক ইলাহী
- Born: 1977 (age 48–49); Rangpur, Bangladesh
- Occupations: Architect, academic
- Employer: Shahjalal University of Science and Technology
- Known for: Architectural education
- Children: K. Tausif Elahi
- Father: K. Maudood Elahi
- Relatives: Hasan M. Elahi (cousin); K. Mukhtar Elahi (uncle)
- Website: Official website

K. Taufiq Elahi is a Bangladeshi architect and academic. He is an associate professor in the Department of Architecture at Shahjalal University of Science and Technology (SUST), Sylhet. He is a founding faculty member of the department and has published research on Bengal architecture, urban history, and housing in South Asia.

== Personal life ==
Elahi is the only son of Bangladeshi professor and businessman K. Maudood Elahi and professor Sabiha Sultana. He is a member of the Elahi family, who owns substantial land in Rangpur.

== Early life and education ==
Elahi studied architecture at Khulna University, graduating in 2001. He completed his masters degree from Bangladesh University of Engineering and Technology.

== Academic career ==
He was a visiting faculty at Department of Real Estate, Daffodil International University in January 2012 to January 2013. He also was a visiting faculty at Department of Architecture, Leading University in January 2007 to January 2010. Furthermore, he served as an assistant architect at InGrid Architects in April 2002 to July 2005

Elahi joined the newly established Department of Architecture at Shahjalal University of Science and Technology as a founding faculty member in 2005 and later became associate professor. His teaching includes architectural design studios and urban design, and he has supervised thesis projects such as the Bengal Hub for Contemporary Art design studio. He is currently serving as a student advisor of his department and formerly served as the department head.

He has also served as tutor in urban design studio projects including public-space redevelopment proposals around the Kuril Flyover in Dhaka, which participated in the Archiprix Competition.

== Research and other professional activities ==
Elahi’s research focuses on Bengal architectural heritage, urban development, and housing in South Asia. He has authored multiple journal papers, including work on architectural theory and the concept of the sublime in architecture. According to his university profile, he has published seven peer-reviewed journal articles. His thesis is displayed in the Silk Road Virtual Museum.

Selected topics of his research include:

- Architectural history of Sylhet
- Somapura Mahavihara at Paharpur
- Formal and informal housing sectors in Dhaka

Beyond academia, Elahi practices as a freelance architect and has participated in architectural design initiatives and competitions, including the Inspireli Awards collaborative project Tale of Corridors: Participatory Block Development.

He is also a photographer and serves as an advisor to the Shahjalal University Photographers' Association.
