= K. Mukhtar Elahi =

Bangladeshi freedom fighter (1949-1971)

Bir Muktijoddha Shaheed K. Mukhtar Elahi
- Born: 26 March 1949; Rangpur
- Died: 9 November 1971 (aged 22); Rangpur
- Citizenship: Pakistan
- Relatives: K. Maudood Elahi (brother), Hasan M. Elahi (nephew), K. Taufiq Elahi (nephew), K. Tausif Elahi (grandnephew)

Bir Muktijoddha Shaheed Khondkar Mukhtar Elahi Chinu (1949–1971) was a political leader and a martyr who fought for Bangladesh in the Bangladesh Liberation War.

== Early life and education ==
Elahi was born on March 26, 1949 in Rangpur, Bangladesh to K. Daad Elahi and Mariam Khanam. He was the fourth son of six brothers (Bir Muktijoddha K. Manzoor Elahi, K. Maudood Elahi, Bir Muktijoddha K. Mushtaq Elahi, K. Mahfuz Elahi, K. Murad Elahi, and K. Maruf Elahi) and three sisters.

He graduated in English literature at Carmichael College. He was the head of the Mujib team, district Mujib Bahini and the student league of Rangpur.

== Activities during the Bangladesh Liberation War ==
Elahi undertook his war training in India and entered Bangladesh along with a team of guerrilla fighters from the Shahabganj district of Cooch Behar. He also led a guerrilla team from Dinhata.

Elahi decided to attack strategic locations of Pakistani forces in Rangpur. He stopped in Lalmonirhat at night on November 1971 with a small team of Mukti Bahini. The village Elahi was staying was besieged by the Pakistani forces after they found Elahi and his comrade’s location. All the members of the Mukti Bahini were captured. They were interrogated about the locations of other freedom fighters and their information. Elahi refused to answer and was tortured and finally killed on November 9, 1971. His comrades and other civilians who were detained were also killed.

== Legacy ==
A large monument is erected for him beside his grave at Air-Khamar of Barabari Union in Lalmonirhat. It is near a school.

Multiple locations in Bangladesh has been named after Elahi. These include a students' restroom in Carmichael College (Shaheed Mukhtar Elahi (Chinu) Student Restroom) and a road (Shaheed Mukhtar Elahi Street) and a square (Shaheed Mukhtar Elahi Square) in Rangpur. Also, Begum Rokeya University named a hall after him.

In 2006, supporters of Elahi demolished a plaque which showed a list of freedom fighter's of Rangpur as it did not contain his name.

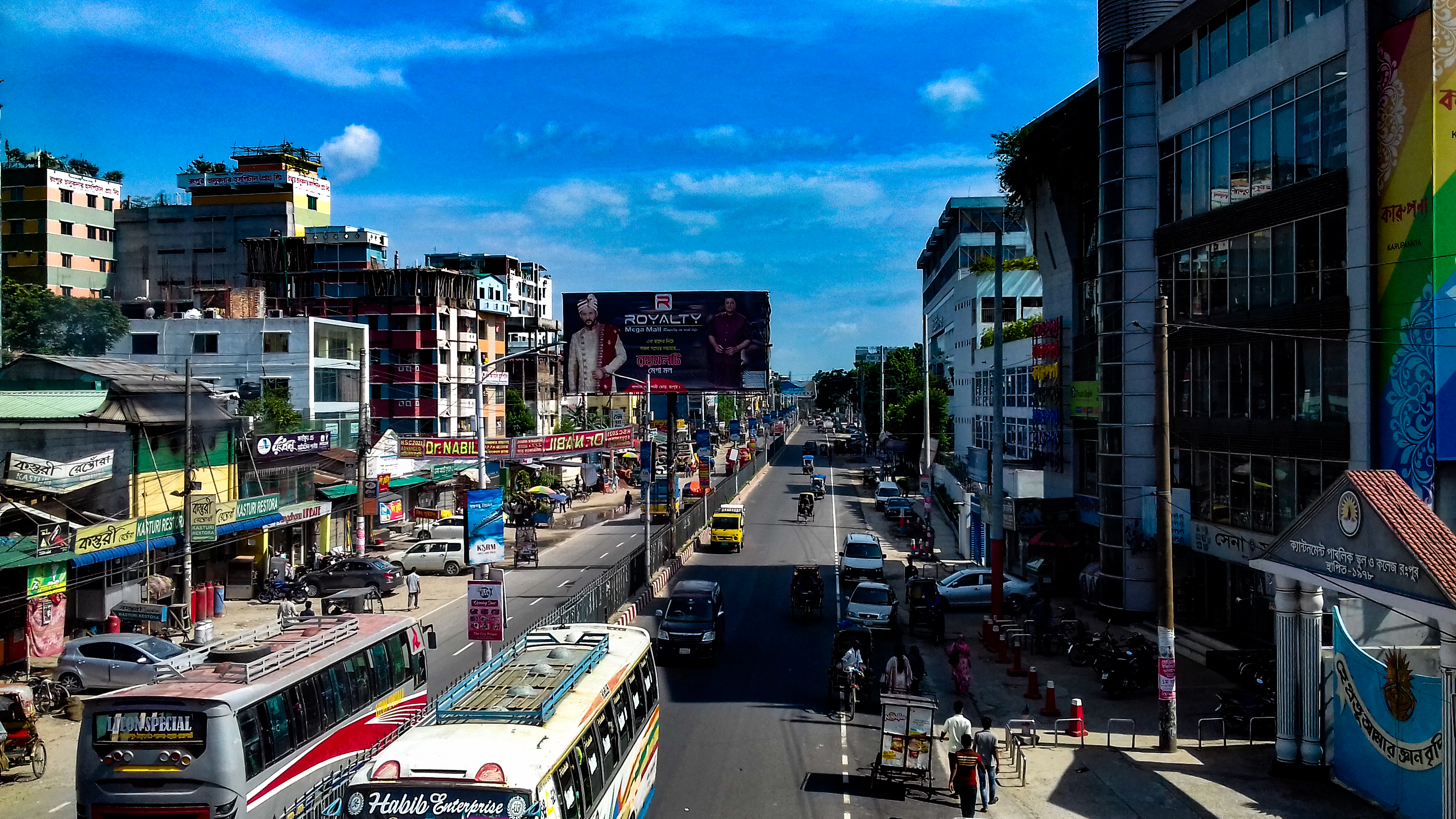
Rangpur City Bypass near Shahid Mukhtar Elahi Intersection
