= Ahmede Hussain =

Bangladeshi writer (born 1978)

- Born: July 16, 1978 (age 48); Bangladesh
- Occupations: Writer, editor

Ahmede Hussain (born 16 July 1978) is a Bangladeshi writer, journalist and editor. He is the founding editor of the news portal The Deltagram.

His ancestors are from the former Portuguese enclave of Patherghata, Chittagong, in Bangladesh.

He was the literary editor of The Daily Star and left the newspaper in 2015. His journalism is focused on South Asian politics and strategic affairs.

He edited The New Anthem: The Subcontinent in its Own Words, an anthology of fiction from the Indian subcontinent. The book has been greeted with acclaim: "The richness is all, both in terms of the writers brought together and in the quality of the tales that come to you one after the other".

== Works ==
- Hussain, Ahmede, ed. (2009). The New Anthem: The Subcontinent in its Own Words. Chennai, India: Tranquebar Press. ISBN 978-9380032450.
- Hussain, Ahmede. "Blues for Allah". Monash University
