= Bangladesh Physics Olympiad =

Annual physics competition in Bangladesh

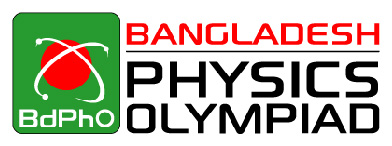
- Website: www.bdpho.org

The Bangladesh Physics Olympiad (BdPhO) is a high school physics competition run by Bangladesh Physics Olympiad association since 2011 to select the team to represent Bangladesh at the International Physics Olympiad (IPhO). The team is selected through a series of exams testing their problem solving abilities.

== Rounds ==
The competition culminates in the selection of a national team to represent Bangladesh at the International Physics Olympiad (IPhO).The Bangladesh Physics Olympiad (BdPhO) is a multi-stage competition designed to identify and nurture talented young physicists in Bangladesh.

=== Regional Round ===
It is open to all interested students. Students get divided into different cetagory (A,B,C,D) based on their academic grade and age.It is held at designated centers across the country. It involves challenging written exam, often with theoretical and problem-solving questions. Successful participants move on to the national level.

=== National Round ===
The most competitive stage, involving a rigorous written exam and potentially interviews. Top performers from this round are selected for the training camp.

=== Training Camp ===
It is an intensive training program for the selected students. It involves theoretical lectures, problem-solving sessions, and mock exams. The training camp helps prepare students for international competitions.

=== International Competitions ===
Bangladesh sends teams to prestigious international competitions like the International Physics Olympiad (IPhO) and the Asian Physics Olympiad (APhO).

== See also ==
- International Physics Olympiad.
- Asian Physics Olympiad.
- International Science Olympiad.
- Bangladesh Mathematical Olympiad
- Bangladesh Biology Olympiad
