= Bangladesh Mathematical Olympiad =

Annual mathematical competition in Bangladesh

- Start Date: April, 2001
- Country: Bangladesh
- Host: Bangladesh Mathematics Olympiad Committee
- Patron: Dutch-Bangla Bank
- Management: Prothom Alo
- Website: matholympiad.org.bd
- BDMO Online Website: online.matholympiad.org.bd
- Venue: St. Joseph Higher Secondary School
- Slogan: Learn mathematics, see dreams (গণিত শেখো, স্বপ্ন দেখো)

The Bangladesh Mathematical Olympiad (BDMO) is an annual mathematical competition arranged for school and college students to nourish their interest and capabilities for mathematics. It has been regularly organized by the Bangladesh Math Olympiad Committee since 2001. Bangladesh Math Olympiad activities started in 2003 formally.

== History ==
The first Math Olympiad was held at Shahjalal University of Science and Technology. Mohammad Kaykobad, Muhammad Zafar Iqbal, and Munir Hasan were instrumental in its establishment. With the endeavor of the members of the committee, the daily newspaper Prothom Alo, and the Dutch Bangla Bank Limited, the committee promptly achieved its primary goal – to send a team to the International Mathematical Olympiad. Bangladeshi students have participated in the International Mathematical Olympiad since 2005.

== Purpose ==
Besides arranging divisional and national math Olympiads, the committee extends its cooperation to all interested groups and individuals who want to arrange a mathematics Olympiad. The Bangladesh Math Olympiad and the selection of the Bangladeshi national team for the International Mathematical Olympiad are bound by rules set by the Olympiad Committee. The Bangladesh Mathematical Olympiad is open for school and college students from the country. The competitions usually take place around December–January–February.

== Achievements ==
In the 2014 International Mathematical Olympiad, the Bangladesh team achieved one silver, one bronze, and four honorable mentions, placing the country at 53 among 101 participating countries. In the 2015 International Mathematical Olympiad, the Bangladesh team achieved one silver, four bronze, and one honorable mention, finishing in 33rd place. Ahmed Zawad Chowdhury, who previously won a silver and a bronze in 2017 and 2016, helped Bangladesh win a gold medal for the first time in the 2018 International Mathematical Olympiad. He had previously missed a gold medal in 2017 by only two marks.

== Format ==
The students are divided into four academic categories: primary (Class 3–5), junior (Class 6–8), secondary (Class 9–10), higher secondary (Class 11–12)

=== Selection Round ===
After achieving their 1st gold medal in the International Mathematics Olympiad in 2018, the competition spread all over the country. The organisers took selection round in 64 districts of Bangladesh in 2019. In 2020,2021,2022 due to the COVID-19 pandemic, this competition was held entirely via an online platform on 29 February. The selected participant of selection round can attend the regional competition. The selection rounds are currently taken online.

=== Regional Olympiad ===
The country is divided into 20 regions for the Regional Olympiad. In each division except Dhaka, nearly 60 students among 1000 participants are selected for the National Olympiad. In Dhaka, the number of participants is more than 3000, and 100–150 are selected for the National Olympiad. In all the problems in the Regional Olympiad, only the final answers are necessary.

=== National Olympiad ===
In the National Olympiad, the top 71 participants are given prizes. The time given for solving the problems depends on the category: 2 hours for the Primary category, 3 hours for the Junior category, and 4 hours for the Secondary and Higher Secondary category.

=== National Math Camp ===
A group for the National Math Camp is selected from the winners of the National Olympiad.

== Medal winners in International Mathematical Olympiad ==
For every year since 2005, Bangladeshi students have participated in the International Mathematical Olympiad. Samin Riasat and Nazia Chowdhury won bronze medals for Bangladesh in 2009. Dhananjoy Biswas won the first silver medal for Bangladesh in 2012. Ahmed Zawad Chowdhury brought the first and only (till now) gold medal for Bangladesh in 2018.

The following is the full list of medal winners from Bangladesh:

Year	Name of the Recipient	Medal
2009	Samin Riasat	Bronze
2009	Nazia Chowdhury	Bronze
2010	Tarik Adnan	Bronze
2011	Dhananjoy Biswas	Bronze
2012	Dhananjoy Biswas	Silver
2012	Sourav Das	Bronze
2012	Nur Muhammad Shafiullah	Bronze
2013	Nur Muhammad Shafiullah	Bronze
2013	Adib Hasan	Bronze
2013	Sourav Das	Bronze
2014	Nur Muhammad Shafiullah	Silver
2014	Adib Hasan	Bronze
2015	Md Sanzeed Anwar	Silver
2015	Adib Hasan	Bronze
2015	Asif E Elahi	Bronze
2015	Md Sabbir Rahman	Bronze
2015	Sazid Akhter Turzo	Bronze
2016	Asif E Elahi	Silver
2016	Ahmed Zawad Chowdhury	Bronze
2016	Md Sabbir Rahman	Bronze
2016	Sazid Akhter Turzo	Bronze
2016	S M Nayeemul Islam Swad	Honourable Mention
2016	Md Sanzeed Anwar	Honourable Mention
2017	Asif E Elahi	Silver
2017	Ahmed Zawad Chowdhury	Silver
2017	Rahul Saha	Bronze
2017	Tamzid Morshed Rubab	Bronze
2017	S M Nayeemul Islam Swad	Honourable Mention
2017	Md Sabbir Rahman	Honourable Mention
2018	Ahmed Zawad Chowdhury	Gold
2018	Thanic Nur Samin	Bronze
2018	Joydip Saha	Bronze
2018	Tamzid Morshed Rubab	Bronze
2018	Rahul Saha	Honourable mention
2018	Soumitra Das	Honourable mention
2019	M. Ahsan Al Mahir	Bronze
2019	Soumitra Das	Honourable mention
2019	Ahmed Ittihad Hasib	Honourable mention
2019	Md Maruf Hasan Rubab	Honourable mention
2019	Dewan Saadman Hasan	Honourable mention
2020	Ahmed Ittihad Hasib	Silver
2020	M Ahsan Al Mahir	Bronze
2020	Md Maruf Hasan Rubab	Bronze
2020	Adnan Sadik	Bronze
2020	Soumitra Das	Bronze
2020	Raiyan Jamil	Bronze
2021	Tahmid Hameem Chowdhury	Bronze
2021	Nujhat Ahmed Disha	Honourable mention
2021	Tahjib Hossain Khan	Honourable mention
2021	Md. Maruf Hasan Rubab	Bronze
2021	Adnan Sadik	Bronze
2022	Tahjib Hossain Khan	Bronze
2022	Prethiraj Roy	Honourable Mention
2022	Md. Fuad Al Alam	Honourable Mention
2022	S.M.A Nahian	Honourable Mention
2022	Ashraful Islam Fahim	Honourable Mention
2022	Nujhat Ahmed Disha	Honourable Mention
2023	Nujhat Ahmed Disha	Bronze
2023	S.M.A Nahian	Bronze
2023	Shahriar Hossain	Bronze
2023	Debapriya Saha Roy	Honourable Mention
2023	Jitendra Barua	Honourable Mention
2024	Monamy Zaman	Bronze
2024	S.M.A Nahian	Bronze
2024	Jitendra Barua	Honourable Mention
2024	Musahid Ahmed	Honourable Mention
2024	Md. Nafis Noor Taseen	Honourable Mention
2024	Tahsin Khan	Honourable Mention
2025	Jitendra Barua	Bronze
2025	Jawad Hameem Chowdhury	Bronze
2025	Tahsin Khan	Bronze
2025	M. Zamiul Hossain	Honourable Mention
2025	Monamy Zaman	Honourable Mention
2025	Md. Raihan Siddiquee	Honourable Mention
2026	Md. Raihan Siddiquee	Silver
2026	Tahsin Khan	Bronze
2026	M. Zamiul Hossain	Bronze
2026	Jawad Hameem Chowdhury	Bronze
2026	Monamy Zaman	Bronze
2026	Mohammed Marzuq Rahman	Bronze

== See also ==
- Bangladesh Physics Olympiad
- Bangladesh Biology Olympiad
