= Sharif Imam =

Civil engineer and husband of Jahanara Imam (1925–1971)

Sharif Imam শরীফ ইমাম
- Born: October 30, 1925; Domar, Rangpur
- Died: December 13, 1971 (aged 46); Dhaka, East Pakistan
- Resting place: Dhaka, Bangladesh
- Education: Rangpur Carmichael College, Shibpur Engineering College
- Spouse: Jahanara Imam (1948–1971)
- Children: Shafi Imam Rumi, Saif Imam Jami

Shariful Alam Imam Ahmed (Bengali: শরীফ ইমাম) (October 30, 1925—December 13, 1971) was a participator in Bangladesh War of Independence. He is most widely remembered as the husband of "Shaheed Janani" (Mother of Martyrs), Jahanara Imam, and as the father of guerrilla fighter Shafi Imam Rumi. He is a character in Jahanara Imam's famous memoir Ekattorer Dingulee (Bengali: একাত্তরের দিনগুলি, English: Of Blood and Fire (translator Mustafizur Rahman)).

== Biography ==
Sharif Imam was a Civil engineer. In 1948, he married Jahanara Imam, whom he met in Rangpur while studying at Carmichael College. They settled in Dhaka.

== Role in War of Independence ==
In 1971, following the Pakistan army crackdown on pro-independence militants and supporters on 25 March, the Bangladesh War broke out. Many joined the independence war, including Imam's elder son Shafi Imam Rumi, who joined the Mukti Bahini during the war, Imam's wife Jahanara Imam wrote a diary on her feelings about the struggle. This later became one of the most important publications about the War of Independence.

Sharif and his friend Sajedur Rahman collected and sent money to the pro-independence fighters. At the end of June 1971, Shahadat Chowdhury and Habibul Alam came to Sharif's house with a letter from Sector-2 commander Major Khaled Mosharraf. Mosharraf asked Sharif information about bridges and culverts of Bangladesh in order to hamper Pakistani army's movement. Patriot Sharif used to provide detail information of the exact points where to set explosives so that the bridge will be damaged but also there will be less damage so that it can be repaired easily after the country is liberated.

His son, Rumi took part in many actions against Pakistan army, he was to be picked up by the Pakistani army, never to be seen again. Imam and his younger son Jami, and Jami's cousin were also picked up for interrogation and were tortured. Imam returned home as a broken man only to die three days before Bangladesh became free on 16 December 1971.

As Yahya Khan was set to announce mass mercy on September 5, 1971, many family relatives instated to ask mercy petition for Rumi to the government. Rumi's parents took the suggestion and thought over it but later decided to not do so because they considered it to be a dishonor to Rumi's views and ideology.

Sharif underwent a massive heart-attack on 13 December 1971, was rushed to IPGMR (popularly known as PG hospital, later renamed to BSMMU), where he died at late night because the defibrillator couldn't be used due to a blackout being carried out as an official Bangladesh War of Independence began.
