= K. Maudood Elahi =

Bangladeshi professor and businessman (1945-2025)

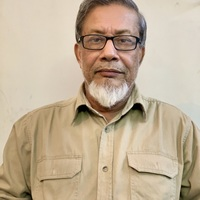
- K. Maudood Elahi
- Born: 1945; Bankura, British India
- Died: 2025 (aged 79–80); Dhaka, Bangladesh
- Father: K. Dad Elahi
- Relatives: Hasan M. Elahi (nephew); K. Mukhtar Elahi (brother)

Khondker Maudood Elahi (1945 – 2025) was a Bangladeshi professor, educationist, and the pro-vice chancellor at multiple universities and acting vice chancellor at Stamford University. He is a member of the Elahi family, who owns substantial land in Rangpur.

== Personal life ==
K. Maudood Elahi was born to K. Dad Elahi and Mariam Khanam. He was the second son of his parents; his brothers include Bir Muktijoddha K. Manzoor Elahi, Bir Muktijoddha K. Mushtaq Elahi, Late Bir Muktijoddha Shaheed K. Mukhtar Elahi.

He was married to Dr. Professor Sabiha Sultana, who was a professor at the Jahangirnagar University. They have a son, K. Taufiq Elahi, an associate professor at Shahjalal University of Science and Technology.

He died in July 2025 at Dhaka due to cardiac arrest. He is buried in Rangpur. Stamford University arranged a large mourning for his death.

== Career ==
K. Maudood Elahi graduated from Dhaka University in 1966 and PhD from the Durham University in 1971 when he was 26 years old. During his tenure in Durham, he was an active member of Socialist International.

He has served at the Department of Geography and Environment, Jahangirnagar University from 1972 to 2005. He was a chairman of the department. He retired in 2006.

He was a pro-vice chancellor from 2007 to 2020 and professor and founder chairman of the Department of Environmental Science at Stamford University Bangladesh. He also served as the acting vice chancellor for a short time at the university mentioned above.

He was the pro-vice chancellor at the second largest university in the world, National University Bangladesh from 2019 to 2020.

His research interest is related to population, environment and development. He has contributed numerous journals and books on the topics mentioned above.

== Bibliography ==
=== Selected books ===
- Elahi, K. Maudood; Kosiński, Leszek A. (1985), Population Redistribution and Development in South Asia, Springer, ISBN 978-90-277-1938-6
- Elahi, K. Maudood; Ara, Iffat (2008), Understanding the Monga in Northern Bangladesh, Academic Press and Publishers Library, ISBN 984-08-0236-4
- Elahi, K. Maudood; Kamruzzaman, Md. (1991), জনসংখ্যা শব্দকোষ, Bangla Academy
- Elahi, K. Maudood; Rogge, John R. (1991), Riverbank Erosion, Flood, and Population Displacement in Bangladesh: A Report on the Riverbank Erosion Impact Study, Jahangirnagar University & University of Manitoba
- Elahi, K. Maudood, পরিসংখ্যান পদ্ধতি এবং স্থানিক বিশ্লেষণ, Academic Press and Publishers Library
- Elahi, K. Maudood; Kosiński, Leszek A. (1985). Kosiński, Leszek A.; Elahi, K. Maudood (eds.). Trends and Patterns of Population Redistribution in South Asia. Dordrecht: D. Reidel Publishing Company. pp. 15–38. doi:10.1007/978-94-009-5309-3_2. ISBN 978-90-277-1938-6.

=== Selected research papers ===
- Elahi, K. Maudood (1989). "Population Displacement Due to River Bank Erosion of the Jamuna in Bangladesh". Population and Disaster: 81–97. ISBN 978-0-631-16682-5.
- Elahi, K. Maudood; Rogge, John R. (1990). "Riverbank Erosion and Population Displacement in Bangladesh: A Summary of Main Findings". Riverbank Erosion Impact Study (REIS) Monograph Series. 1: 1–10.
- Elahi, K. Maudood (1991). "Riverbank Erosion, Flood Hazard and Population Displacement in Bangladesh: An Overview". Riverbank Erosion, Flood and Population Displacement in Bangladesh: 1–10.
- Elahi, K. Maudood; Sultana, Sabiha (2009). Akhtar, Rais (ed.). Resurgence of Malaria in Bangladesh. Springer. p. 107–122.
- Basak, Palash; Dey, Soma; Elahi, K. Maudood (2022). Akhtar, Rais (ed.). COVID-19 in Bangladesh: A Spatio-temporal and Gender Analysis. Springer Nature. doi:10.1007/978-3-031-09432-3_11.
- Basak, Palash; Dey, Soma; Elahi, K. Maudood (2023). Akhtar, Rais (ed.). Air Pollution in Urban Bangladesh from Climate Change and Public Health Perspectives. Global Perspectives on Health Geography. Springer Nature. pp. 129–146. doi:10.1007/978-3-031-38878-1_9.
- Elahi, K. Maudood (1981). "Refugees in Dandakaranya: Political and Socio-Economic Aspects of Rehabilitation". International Migration Review. 15 (1–2): 219–225. doi:10.1177/0197918381015001-222.
- Patwary, M. A.; O'Hare, W. T.; Street, G.; Elahi, K. M.; Billah, S. M.; Sikder, A. M. (2009). "Quantitative Assessment of Medical Waste Generation in the Capital City of Bangladesh". Waste Management. 29 (8): 2392–2397. doi:10.1016/j.wasman.2009.03.021.
