= Jahanara Imam =

Bangladeshi writer and political activist

- জাহানারা ইমাম
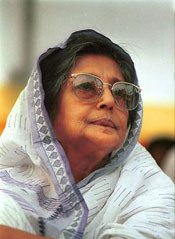
- Imam in 1993
- Born: 3 May 1929; Murshidabad, Bengal Presidency, British India
- Died: 26 June 1994 (aged 65); Detroit, Michigan, U.S.
- Resting place: Dhaka, Bangladesh
- Education: MA Bangladeshi(1971-1994)
- Alma mater: University of Dhaka; University of San Diego
- Spouse: Sharif Imam (m. 1948–1971)
- Children: Shafi Imam Rumi (son); Saif Imam Jami (son)
- Parents: Syed Abdul Ali (father); Hamida Ali (mother)

Jahanara Imam (3 May 1929 – 26 June 1994) was a Bangladeshi writer and political activist. She is known for her efforts to bring war criminals to trial for war crimes during the Bangladesh Liberation War. She has been called "Shaheed Janani" (Mother of Martyrs).

== Biography ==
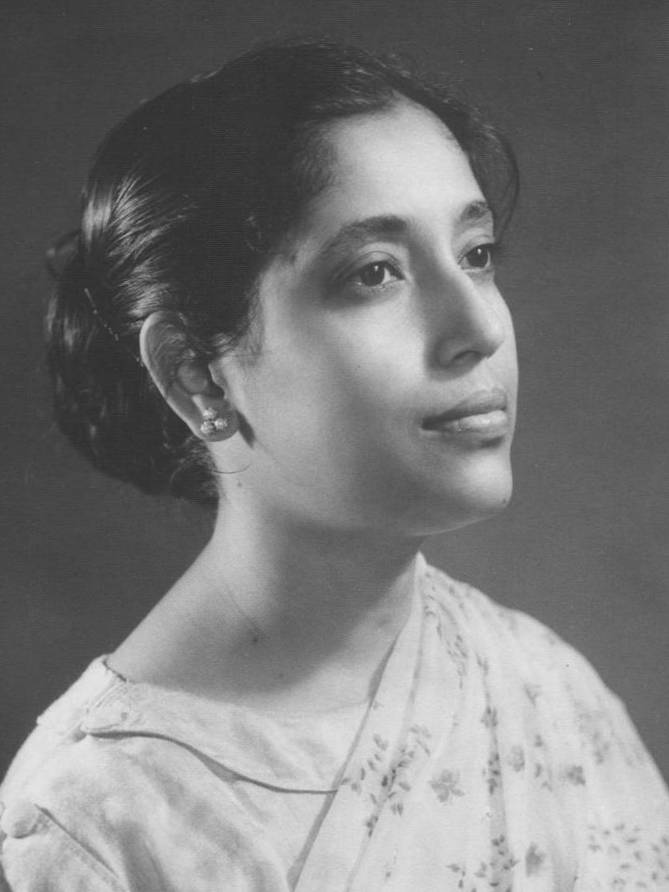
Imam in 1957

Imam was born on 3 May 1929 in Murshidabad, West Bengal, British India, the eldest daughter in a family of three brothers and four sisters. Her father, Syed Abdul Ali, was a civil servant in the Bengal Civil Service. She lived in many different parts of Bengal – wherever her father was posted. Her mother was Hamida Ali. At that time there was a lot of social pressure against Muslim women pursuing further studies, but Hamida was determined that Jahanara's education would not be constrained.

After finishing her studies in 1945 in Carmichael College in Rangpur, Imam went to Lady Brabourne College of Calcutta University and in 1947 obtained her bachelor's degree. She was an activist in Lady Brabourne College. After the partition of India, she joined her family in Mymensingh in what became East Pakistan and started teaching at Vidyamoyee Govt. Girls High School.

In 1948, she married Sharif Imam, a civil engineer, whom she met in Rangpur while studying at Carmichael College. They settled in Dhaka and she joined Siddheswari Girls' School as head mistress. She was instrumental in transforming the school into one of the top girls' schools in Dhaka.

She was the first editor of the monthly women's magazine, Khawateen. It started publication in 1951 and she ran it for several years. In 1960, Imam gave up her job as the head mistress to concentrate on bringing up her two sons Rumi and Jami born in 1951 and 1954 respectively. She said to herself, "I have given education to thousands of school children, now I should spend some time to bring up my own children".

During this time, Imam finished her master's degree in Bengali language and literature and a bachelor's degree in education from the University of Dhaka in 1962 and 1963 respectively. After that she went back to full-time teaching. From 1966 to 1968, she worked as a lecturer in the Teacher's Training College in Dhaka. From 1970, she also taught for several years on a part-time basis in the Institute of Modern Language at the University of Dhaka.

Imam spent a significant part of her life in education. She visited the US in 1964–65 as a Fulbright Scholar to University of San Diego and again in 1977 under the International Visitor Program at the invitation of the US Government.

== 1971 Liberation War ==
In 1971, following the Pakistan army crackdown on 25 March, the Bangladesh Liberation War broke out. Many joined the liberation struggle, including Jahanara's elder son Shafi Imam Rumi, who joined the Mukti Bahini, the main resistance force behind the liberation movement. During the war, she wrote a diary on her feelings about the struggle. This later became one of the most important publications about the Bangladesh War of Liberation.

Rumi took part in many actions against Pakistan army. Unfortunately, he was to be picked up by the Pakistani army, never to be seen again. Jahanara's husband and her younger son Jami along with other male members of the family were also picked up for interrogation and were tortured. Her husband Sharif Imam returned home a broken man only to die three days before Bangladesh became free on 16 December 1971.

== Literary career ==
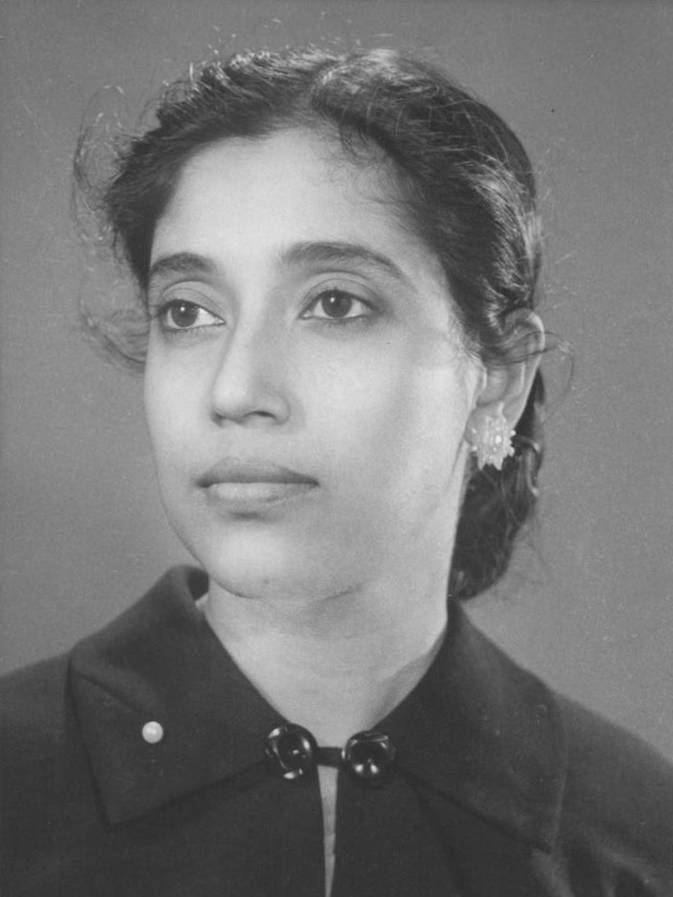
Imam in 1960

After Bangladesh achieved independence, Imam started her literary career. During this time, she also travelled extensively to Europe, USA and Canada. In 1986, she published her wartime diary, Ekattorer Dingulee (The days of Seventy One). Imam's diary, in some respect like that of Anne Frank, was a personal account of tragedy. Her simple style of writing touched many hearts, particularly those of families who had lost members during the war. Early in her career, Imam also translated several books from English into Bengali, including some of the "Little House" books by Laura Ingalls Wilder.

== Committee for Eradicating the Killers and Collaborators of '71 ==
As the ruler of Bangladesh, President Ziaur Rahman (1977–1981) enacted several measures to restore many of the fundamental rights suspended by the 4th amendment of the constitution and reintroduced multi-party democracy by lifting the ban on all political parties including Awami League and Jamaat e Islami.

Ghulam Azam, the exiled chief of the Jamaat-e-Islami, was allowed to come back to Bangladesh in July 1978. In December 1991 Ghulam Azam, was elected the Amir of Jamaat-e-Islami. Subsequently, Jahanara Imam organised the Ghatak-Dalal Nirmul Committee (Committee for Eradicating the Killers and Collaborators of '71), and became its public face. The committee called for the trial of people who committed crimes against humanity in the 1971 Bangladesh Liberation War in collaboration with Pakistani forces. The Ghatak-Dalal Nirmul Committee set up mock trials in Dhaka on 26 March 1992 known as Gono Adalat (People's Court) and 'sentenced' persons they accused of being war criminals. Imam and others were reportedly charged with treason during the rule of the coalition government later on. This charge was however dropped in 1996 after her death by the Chief Adviser Muhammad Habibur Rahman of the caretaker government. However, Bangladeshi writer and filmmaker Humayun Ahmed, disagrees that she was charged and commented that her movement was part of a "stage-managed game."

== Death and legacy ==
In 1981, Imam was diagnosed with mouth cancer, and operations caused her to have difficulty speaking, she continued to write and continued her involvement with the freedom fighters. She died on 26 June 1994 in Michigan, U.S. She was later buried in Dhaka.

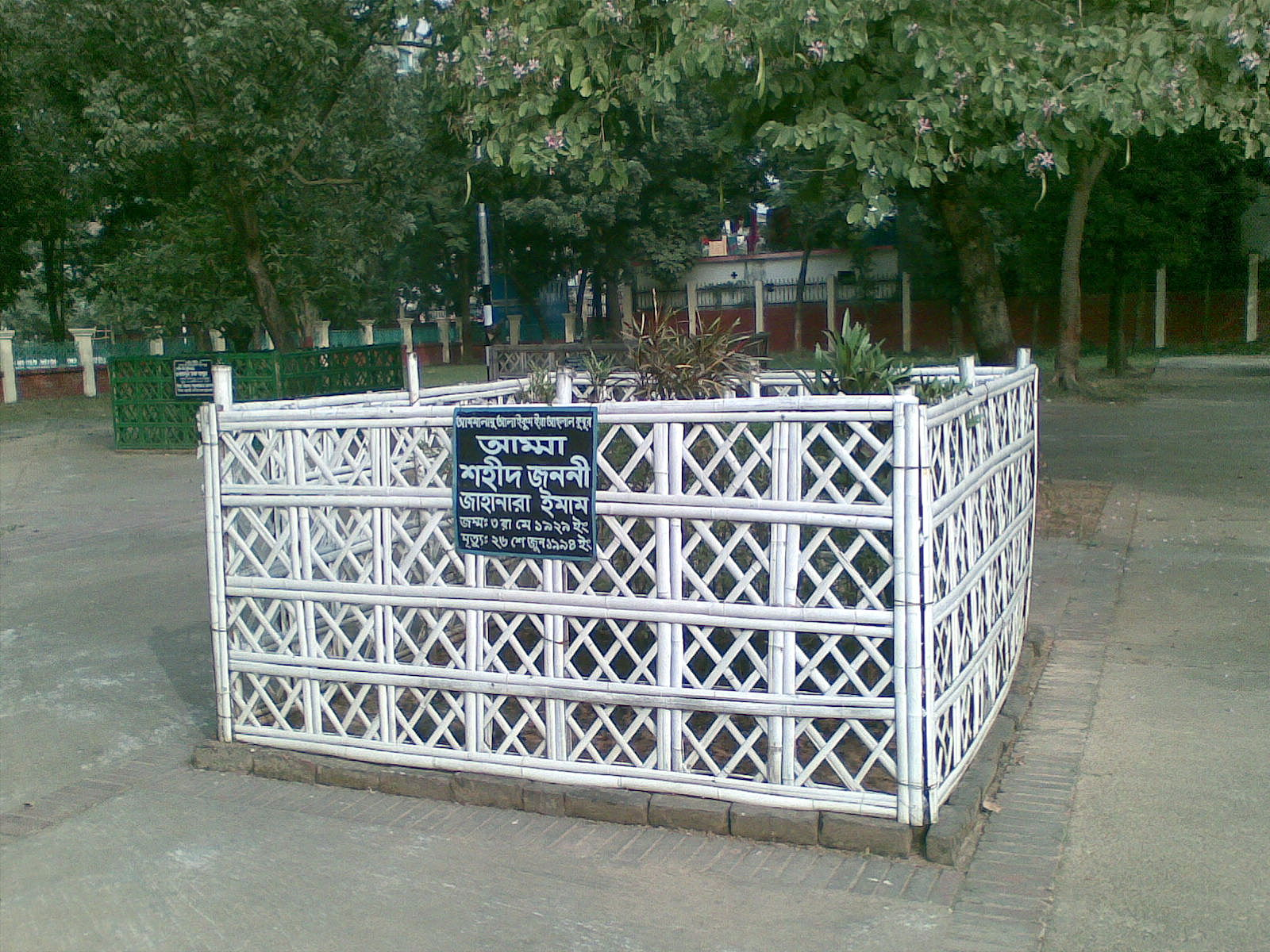
Grave of Jahanara Imam in Martyred Intellectuals Graveyard, Mirpur

Her death anniversary is observed in Bangladesh. Bangladesh Nationalist Party Member of Parliament Syeda Ashifa Ashrafi has criticised Imam. Ali Ahsan Mohammad Mojaheed was found guilty over the murder of her son in the Bangladesh Liberation War by International Crimes Tribunal. Nuran Nabi wrote a book on her titled as, "the last days of Jahanara Imam in America".

== Awards ==
- Award from Bangladesh Writer's Association (1988)
- Bangla Academy Literary Award (1991)
- Independence Day Award (1997)
- Rokeya Padak (1998)

=== Literary works ===
- Anya Jiban (1985) (Other life)
- Ekattorer Dingulee (1986) (The days of 1971)
- Birshrestha (1985) (The Bravest)
- Jiban Mrityu (1988) (Life and death)
- Chirayata Sahitya (1989)
- Buker Bhitare Agun (1990) (Fire in my heart)
- Nataker Abasan (1990) (End of drama)
- Dui Meru (1990) (Two poles)
- Nihsabga Pine (1990)
