= Hasan M. Elahi =

Bangladeshi-American artist (born 1972)

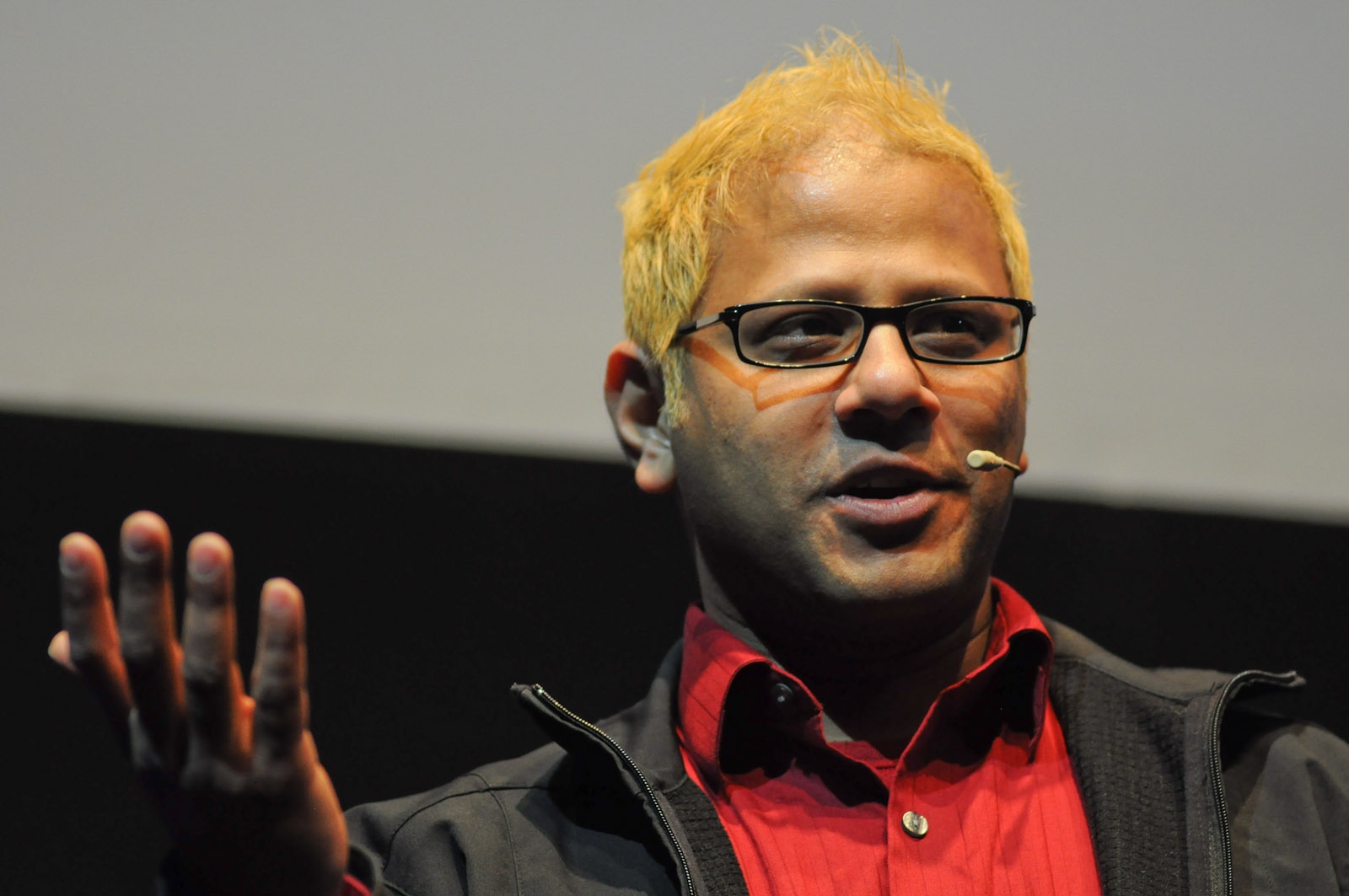
- Elahi during the Lift conference, February 2011
- Born: 1972 (age 53–54); Rangpur, Bangladesh
- Known for: Interdisciplinary Art, Professor

Hasan M. Elahi (born 1972) is a Bangladeshi-born American interdisciplinary media artist whose work has an emphasis on technology and media and their social implications.

== Personal life ==
He was born in Rangpur, Bangladesh in 1972 and was raised in New York City.

== Sousveillance ==
Elahi presented in a panel on "Sousveillance-Culture" at the 2007 Conflux conference.

== Faculty positions ==
Elahi was appointed Dean of Arizona Arts in June of 2025 term to begin July 1, 2025;. Prior to this, he was a professor of art and Dean of the College of Fine, Performing and Communication Arts at Wayne State University in Detroit, Michigan. Previously he was director of the school of art at George Mason University. Before that, he was an associate professor at the University of Maryland, and director of the Digital Cultures and Creativity Honors program.

== See also ==
- Internet activism
- Tactical media
