= List of modern equipment of the Bulgarian Armed Forces =

This is a list of the equipment currently in use by the Bulgarian Armed Forces. The list encompasses equipment from the Joint Forces Command, Land Forces, Joint Special Operations Command, Communications and Information Support and Cyberdefence command, Logistics Support Command and the structures directly subordinate to the Minister of Defence.

== Personal equipment ==
=== Bayonets ===
Model	Image	Origin	Type	Notes
6H2		USSR Bulgaria	Bayonet	Produced locally. Used on AK-47 rifles for ceremonial purposes.
M1895 bayonet		Austria-Hungary	Bayonet	Exact model of the bayonet is uncertain. Used on Mannlicher M1895 carabines for ceremonial purposes only.

=== Camouflage ===
Model	Image	Origin	Type	Variant	Notes
Bulgarian Land Forces camouflage		Bulgaria	Digital Flecktarn-like pattern	For temperate climate	Replaced the old M2003 DPM camouflage. Adopted by the Bulgarian Land Forces around 2018, hence some refer to it as M18. Oddly enough in 2011, years before the Bulgarian pattern was first shown to the public, a Russian camouflage pattern with unknown origin was seen with the 45th Separate Guards Special Purpose Regiment which looks very similar if not almost identical.
Bulgarian Land Forces camouflage		Bulgaria	Splinter pattern camouflage		This pattern originates from the German WWII Splittertarnmuster camouflage pattern. It was succeeded by the M2003 DPM pattern across the armed forces but remains common among tank crews. Tank crews appear to be slowly transitioning to the current M18 camouflage pattern but could still be seen wearing this pattern during the "Balkan Sentinel 25" military exercise.
Bulgarian Land Forces camouflage		Bulgaria	Digital Tropentarn-like pattern	For desert climate	The pattern is very reminiscent of Tropentarn. The pattern was first seen around 2016 and around 2017 it was seen in use with the 32nd Bulgarian Contingent in Afghanistan.
Bulgarian Military Police camouflage		Bulgaria	Disruptive Pattern Material	For temperate climate	It is likely that this pattern is the same as the Land Forces' retired M2003 DPM camouflage. Aside from the Military Police, DPM has practically been fully replaced in all branches of the Armed Forces.
MultiCam		United States	MultiCam		The camouflage pattern is sometimes seen in use with the Bulgarian Special Forces of the Joint Special Operations Command. Occasionally seen with the Military Police as well.
Bulgarian Air Force Camouflage		United States	Universal Camouflage Pattern		The pattern was first seen around 2018. As of 2025 the Air Force has been increasingly seen with M18 camouflage instead.

=== Gas masks ===
Model	Image	Origin	Type	Filter thread	Notes
PF-90		Bulgaria	Gas mask	40mm STANAG & 40mm GOST	Bulgarian-made gas mask with the unique feature of having both GOST and STANAG 40mm filter canister threads.
OM-90		Czech Republic	Gas mask	40mm STANAG	Czech gas mask, allegedly meant to replace the PF-90.
PMK-2		USSR	Gas mask	40mm GOST	Not very common.
PDE-1		Bulgaria	Gas mask	none (internal cheek filters are used)	Locally designated as "ПДЕ" (also referred to as "ПЛДЕ" or "П-1"). Copy of the Czechoslovak M10 gas mask (itself an unlicensed copy of the US M17 gas mask). Used in training.
PMG		USSR Bulgaria	Gas mask	40mm GOST	Soviet gas mask, produced under license in Bulgaria. Used in training.

=== Ballistic protection ===
==== Helmets ====
Model	Image	Origin	Type	Notes
МВН-ACH-BTS		Bulgaria	Combat helmet	Produced by MARS Armor. In service with the Land Forces. Should replace the remaining old helmets including the M72.
Ops Core FAST		United States	Combat helmet	In use by the Joint Special Operations Command.

==== Body armor ====
Model	Image	Origin	Type	Notes
Model 78-10		Bulgaria	Bulletproof vest	Produced by MARS Armor. In service with the Land Forces

==== Bomb suits ====
Model	Image	Origin	Type	Details
SPS 10		Germany	Bomb suit	Manufactured by Garant Protection. Used by the Bulgarian Land Forces for explosive ordinance disposal.
EOD-9		United States	Bomb suit	Manufactured by Med-Eng. Used by the Bulgarian Land Forces for explosive ordinance disposal.

=== Night vision equipment ===
Model	Image	Origin	Type	Notes
DIANA M40		Bulgaria	Monocular Night-vision device	Produced by Optix. In service with the Special Forces and the Land Forces.
AN/PVS-14		United States	Monocular Night-vision device	In service with the Joint Special Operations Command.
DIANA A		Bulgaria	Binocular Night-vision device	Produced by Optix. Used by helicopter pilots in the Air Force.
DIANA TT		Bulgaria	Binocular Night-vision device	Produced by Optix. In service with the Land Forces.

== Firearms ==
=== Handguns ===
Model	Image	Origin	Type	Calibre	Notes
Makarov		USSR Bulgaria	Semi-automatic pistol	9×18mm	Local production and standard issue to the Armed Forces. Soviet-made units are also in service. The earliest known locally produced examples date back to 1975. Can be recognised through "((10))" arsenal markings, straight hammer serrations, slim star grip shells. The Armed Forces are going to replace the Makarov pistol in the near future.The successor has to be chambered in 9x19mm.
Sig Sauer SP2022		Germany	Semi-automatic pistol	9×19mm Parabellum	Used by Bulgarian Military Police, parts of the Land Forces and the Joint Special Operations Command.
SIG Sauer P226		Germany	Semi-automatic pistol	9×19mm Parabellum	Used by Military Police. Some are used with conversion kits, turning them into a fixed-stock weapon system.

=== Assault rifles ===
Model	Image	Origin	Type	Calibre	Notes
AK-47		USSR Bulgaria	Assault rifle	7.62×39mm	Standard issue infantry rifle of the Armed Forces. Produced locally and modernised by Arsenal AD. Currently undergoing a modernization which is expected to be completed by 2025. The modernized rifles are designated as ''AK-47PT1''.
AR-M1		Bulgaria	Assault rifle	7.62×39mm	The rifle isn't a standard issue weapon of the Armed Forces, but it is occasionally seen in training or on parades. Potentially used as a small-scale replacement for older worn-out AK-47 rifles. Produced locally by Arsenal AD. Some examples have been seen in service with the Special forces.
AR-M4SF		Bulgaria	Assault rifle	7.62×39mm	Carbine rifles produced by Arsenal JSCo and used by the Joint Special Operations Command and the Bulgarian Military Police. Variants of the AR-M1 rifle. Limited usage. To be replaced with a 5.56×45mm NATO rifle soon.
AKM		USSR	Assault rifle	7.62×39mm	Modernised variants in use by the Joint Special Operations Command (formerly known as the 68th Special Forces Brigade). Occasionally seen on shooting competitions and during training. Not produced locally. To be replaced with a 5.56×45mm NATO rifle soon.

=== Carabines ===
Model	Image	Origin	Type	Calibre	Notes
SKS		USSR	Semi-automatic rifle	7.62×39mm	Used by the National Guards Unit for ceremonial purposes only.
Mannlicher M1895		Austria-Hungary	Straight pull bolt-action rifle	8×56mmR	Used by the Vasil Levski National Military University and Bulgarian Air Force Academy for ceremonial purposes.

=== Submachine guns ===
Model	Image	Origin	Type	Calibre	Notes
Heckler & Koch MP5 / MP5SD3 / MP5K		Germany	Submachine gun	9×19mm Parabellum	Used by Bulgarian Special Forces ( MP5, MP5SD3 and MP5K) and Military Police (MP5K).

=== Shotguns ===
Model	Image	Origin	Type	Calibre	Notes
Benelli M4 Super 90		Italy	Semi-automatic combat shotgun	12 Gauge	Used by the Joint Special Operations Command and Military Police.
Benelli M3A1		Italy	Pump action shotgun	12 Gauge	Used by the Joint Special Operations Command.

=== Sniper rifles ===
Model	Image	Origin	Type	Calibre	Notes
Heckler & Koch MSG90A1		Germany	Semi-automatic designated marksman rifle	7.62×51mm NATO	Standard of the Bulgarian Land Forces alongside the Dragunov. Also used by the Special Forces.
Heckler & Koch PSG1A1		Germany	Semi-automatic designated marksman rifle	7.62×51mm NATO	PSG-1A1 in use with the Military Police.
Sako TRG M10		Finland	Bolt action sniper rifle	7.62×51mm NATO 8.6×70mm (.338 LM)	Used by the Joint Special Operations Command.
Blaser R93 Tactical 2		Germany	Bolt action sniper rifle	8.6×70mm (.338 LM)	Used by the Joint Special Operations Command.
Ritter & Stark SX-1		Austria	Bolt action sniper rifle	7.62×51mm NATO 8.6×70mm (.338 LM)	Used by the Bulgarian Military Police.
SVD		USSR	Semi-automatic designated marksman rifle	7.62×54mmR	Used by the Bulgarian Land Forces in the 101st Alpine Regiment
Mosin M91/30 PU		USSR	Bolt action sniper rifle	7.62×54mmR	Occasionally seen in use by the 101st Alpine Regiment. Limited usage.
Zastava M91		Yugoslavia	Bolt action sniper rifle	7.62×54mmR	Used In the Land Forces alongside the Dragunov SVD. Limited usage.

=== Machine guns ===
Model	Image	Origin	Type	Calibre	Notes
PK/PKM		USSR Bulgaria	General-purpose machine gun	7.62×54mmR	Used by Special Forces and regular units. Produced locally.
FN MAG		Belgium	General-purpose machine gun	7.62×51mm NATO	Used by the Bulgarian Military Police and Special Forces. Mounted on both remotely and manually operated turrets on the Plasan SandCat and IAG Guardian Xtreme 4×4.
NSV		USSR Bulgaria	Heavy machine gun	12.7×108mm	Standard issue heavy machine gun of the Bulgarian Army and produced by Arsenal. Usually mounted on T-72. Can also be mounted on Mercedes-Benz G270 CDI FB6.
DShK		USSR	Heavy machine gun	12.7×108mm	Currently only used by the Naval Forces on some of their ships.
M2 Browning		United States	Heavy machine gun	12.7×99mm NATO (.50 BMG)	Used on the M1117 and to be used on the Stryker vehicles.1227 M2 QCB variants produced by Canik arms, delivered by Turkey.

=== Non-lethal weapons ===
Model	Image	Origin	Type	Calibre	Notes
FN 303		United States	Semi-automatic less-lethal riot gun	17.3 mm (0.68 in)	Used by the Land Forces and the Military Police during the country's participation in MNF–I. Unknown current status.

=== Flamethrowers ===
Model	Image	Origin	Type	Notes
LPO-50		USSR	Light flamethrower	Unknown numbers in service. The weapon is seemingly rare and isn't shown often. In February 2025, during the BULWARK-25 military exercise, the 3rd Brigade Command shared images of Bulgarian servicemen armed with the flamethrower.

=== Grenade launchers ===
Model	Image	Origin	Type	Calibre	Notes
Mk 19 grenade launcher		United States	Automatic grenade launcher	40 mm grenade	Used on the M1117.
GP-25		USSR Bulgaria	Grenade launcher	40mm caseless grenade	Produced locally by Arsenal AD as the UBGL and the UBGL-1.

== Anti-tank weapons ==
Model	Image	Origin	Type	Calibre	Notes
SPG-9		USSR Bulgaria	Recoilless gun	73 mm (2.87 in) smoothbore	Produced locally as SPG-9DNM.
RPG-22		USSR Bulgaria	Rocket-propelled grenade	High-explosive anti-tank with penetration of 400 mm versus RHA	Produced locally at VMZ Sopot. In service with the Special Forces.
RPG-7		USSR Bulgaria	Rocket-propelled grenade	40 mm	RPG-7V variant produced locally by ARSENAL JSCo. In service with Special Forces and the regular Land Force units.
FGM-148 Javelin		United States	Anti-tank guided missile	127 mm	107 Javelin Lightweight Command Launch Units [LWCLU] and 218 Javelin FGM-148F missiles on order for the Strykers.
9K114 Shturm		USSR	Anti-tank guided missile	High-explosive anti-tank shaped charge	Used with the Bulgarian Air Force's Mi-24 helicopters.
9M113 Konkurs		USSR Bulgaria	Anti-tank guided missile	9N131 high-explosive anti-tank	
9K111 Fagot		USSR Bulgaria	Anti-tank guided missile	High-explosive anti-tank warhead	Produced locally.

== Air defense systems ==
=== Man portable air defense ===
Model	Image	Origin	Type	Wa	Notes
9K34 Strela-3		USSR Bulgaria	Man-portable air-defense system	1.17 kg directed-energy blast fragmentation warhead, 390 g HE content	Assembled locally. In service with the Navy and Special Forces. Recently used during military exercises in 2024.
9K32 Strela-2M		USSR Bulgaria	Man-portable air-defense system	1.15 kg directed-energy blast fragmentation warhead (Strela-2M), 370 g HE content	Assembled locally and in reserve. Recently used during military exercises in 2024.

=== Mobile air defence systems ===
Name	Photo	Origin	Type	In service	Notes
ZU-23-2		USSR	Anti-aircraft gun	N/A	Most ZU-23-2s in Bulgarian service are mounted on ZIL-131 trucks. Operated by the Land Forces.
9K33M3 Osa-AKM (SA-8B Gecko Mod-1)		USSR	6×6 amphibious surface-to-air missile system	24	Highly mobile short-range surface-to-air missile system with 15 km range. In service with the Land Forces.
S-125M Neva-M (SA-3B Goa)		USSR	Short-range air defense system	N/A	Operated by the Air Force. Still in use and partaking in military live firing.
S-75M Volkhov (SA-2C Guideline)		USSR	Medium-range air defense system	N/A	In service with the Air Force as a target for air defense exercises. Live firing tests were held again after a 10-year gap in 2021.
2K12 Kub (SA-6 Gainful)		USSR	Tracked medium-range surface-to-air missile system	20	Entered service in 1974. Operated by the Air Force despite its mobile capabilities and suitability for use with the Land Forces.
S-200 Vega-E (SA-5 Gammon)		USSR	Long-range high-altitude surface-to-air missile system	12 launchers	Entered service in 1984. Operated by the Air Force.
S-300PMU (SA-10 Grumble)		USSR	Long-range surface-to-air and anti-ballistic missile system	8 launchers	Entered service in 1989. Operated by the Air Force.
IRIS-T SLM		Germany	Medium and long-range surface-to-air missile system	(6 SLM batteries and 1 SLX battery on order)	On August 2, 2024, the Bulgarian cabinet sent a request to the parliament to obtain one IRIS-T SLM system for 182 114 000 euros.

== Armoured and utility vehicles ==
=== Tanks ===
Model	Image	Origin	Type	Variant	Quantity	Notes
T-72		USSR	Main battle tank	T-72 Ural	unknown	Possibly 250+ in-store. In 2023, the Bulgarian Armed Forces received the first battalion of 44 T-72M/M1s upgraded locally by the state company TEREM with components provided by Elbit. A second batch of 40 vehicles to be modernized. Some T-72M1s were purchased by Czechia and delivered to Ukraine.
T-72		USSR	Main battle tank	T-72M	unknown	Possibly 250+ in-store. In 2023, the Bulgarian Armed Forces received the first battalion of 44 T-72M/M1s upgraded locally by the state company TEREM with components provided by Elbit. A second batch of 40 vehicles to be modernized. Some T-72M1s were purchased by Czechia and delivered to Ukraine.
T-72		USSR	Main battle tank	T-72M1	unknown	Possibly 250+ in-store. In 2023, the Bulgarian Armed Forces received the first battalion of 44 T-72M/M1s upgraded locally by the state company TEREM with components provided by Elbit. A second batch of 40 vehicles to be modernized. Some T-72M1s were purchased by Czechia and delivered to Ukraine.
T-72		USSR	Main battle tank	T-72M/М1 Mod. 2022	44/84	Possibly 250+ in-store. In 2023, the Bulgarian Armed Forces received the first battalion of 44 T-72M/M1s upgraded locally by the state company TEREM with components provided by Elbit. A second batch of 40 vehicles to be modernized. Some T-72M1s were purchased by Czechia and delivered to Ukraine.

=== Armoured fighting vehicles ===
Model	Image	Origin	Type	Variant	Quantity	Notes
BMP-23		Bulgaria	Infantry fighting vehicle	BMP-23	70	Locally designed infantry fighting vehicle with a 23-mm automatic cannon, 9K111 Fagot anti-tank guided missile launchers with a total of six missiles.
BMP-23		Bulgaria	Infantry fighting vehicle	BMP-23D	70	Locally designed infantry fighting vehicle with a 23-mm automatic cannon, 9K111 Fagot anti-tank guided missile launchers with a total of six missiles.
BMP-23		Bulgaria	Infantry fighting vehicle	BRM-23	70	Locally designed infantry fighting vehicle with a 23-mm automatic cannon, 9K111 Fagot anti-tank guided missile launchers with a total of six missiles.
BMP-1		USSR	Infantry fighting vehicle	BMP-1P	90	Soviet tracked infantry fighting vehicle with amphibious capabilities and a 73-mm smoothbore gun.
Stryker		United States	Infantry fighting vehicle	M1296 Dragoon	0 / 90	183 Stryker ordered by Bulgaria, among which 90 IFV, the M1296 Dragoon, to be equipped with the 30 mm Mk44 Bushmaster II, as well as Javelin missiles.
Stryker		United States	Armoured fighting vehicle	M1126 Infantry carrier vehicle	5 / 17	183 Stryker ordered by Bulgaria, among which 93 vehicles are used for multiple roles.
Stryker		United States	Armoured fighting vehicle	M1130 command vehicle	0 / 33	183 Stryker ordered by Bulgaria, among which 93 vehicles are used for multiple roles.
Stryker		United States	Armoured fighting vehicle	M1132 engineer squad vehicle	0 / 9	183 Stryker ordered by Bulgaria, among which 93 vehicles are used for multiple roles.
Stryker		United States	Armoured fighting vehicle	M1133 medical evacuation vehicle	0 / 24	183 Stryker ordered by Bulgaria, among which 93 vehicles are used for multiple roles.
Stryker		United States	Armoured fighting vehicle	M1135 NBC reconnaissance vehicle	0 / 10	183 Stryker ordered by Bulgaria, among which 93 vehicles are used for multiple roles.
MT-LB		USSR Bulgaria	Armoured multi-role vehicle	MT-LB APC	100	Possibly 600 in store. Light multi-purpose vehicle; mostly used as an armoured personnel carrier. Some variants are used as ambulances. Produced locally under license.
MT-LB		USSR Bulgaria	Armoured multi-role vehicle	MT-LB Ambulance	100	Possibly 600 in store. Light multi-purpose vehicle; mostly used as an armoured personnel carrier. Some variants are used as ambulances. Produced locally under license.
MT-LB		USSR Bulgaria	Armoured multi-role vehicle	MT-LB command vehicle	100	Possibly 600 in store. Light multi-purpose vehicle; mostly used as an armoured personnel carrier. Some variants are used as ambulances. Produced locally under license.
MT-LB		USSR Bulgaria	Armoured multi-role vehicle	B 1-10 Tundzha self-propelled mortar	100	Possibly 600 in store. Light multi-purpose vehicle; mostly used as an armoured personnel carrier. Some variants are used as ambulances. Produced locally under license.
MT-LB		USSR Bulgaria	Armoured multi-role vehicle	MT-LBu command vehicle	100	Possibly 600 in store. Light multi-purpose vehicle; mostly used as an armoured personnel carrier. Some variants are used as ambulances. Produced locally under license.
BTR-60		USSR; Bulgaria	Armoured personnel carrier	BTR60PB	20	Modernized to the BTR-60PB-MD1 standards. Possibly 500 in store. Produced locally. 100 were delivered to Ukraine.
BTR-60		USSR; Bulgaria	Armoured personnel carrier	BTR-60PB-MD1	20	Modernized to the BTR-60PB-MD1 standards. Possibly 500 in store. Produced locally. 100 were delivered to Ukraine.
BRDM-2		USSR	Armoured reconnaissance vehicle	BRDM-2	12	Armoured scout car. 200 in reserve.
BRDM-2		USSR	Anti-tank vehicle	9P148 "Konkurs"	24	Anti-tank vehicle based on BRDM-2 with five AT-5 Spandrel missiles.
M1117		United States	Patrol vehicle	M1117	7	4×4 multi-purpose armoured patrol vehicle.
M1117		United States	Patrol vehicle	Commando Select APC	10	An ambulance variant is also in service.
IAG Guardian Xtreme		United Arab Emirates Bulgaria	Infantry mobility vehicle (mine-resistant ambush protected vehicle)	Guardian Extreme	12	The armoured tactical vehicles are made by the SAMARM joint project between Bulgarian manufacturer Samel 90 and UAE-based International Armoured Group. The vehicles are based on Ford F-550, retaining its chassis, engine and transmission. 4 vehicles are equipped with a roof-mounted Guardian RWS. Operated by the Joint Special Operations Command.
HMMWV		United States	Infantry mobility vehicle	M1114	52	The vehicles were deployed in Afghanistan and continue to serve at home and abroad on peacekeeping missions. In service with the Joint Special Operations Command and Military Police.
HMMWV		United States	Infantry mobility vehicle	M1151A1	52	The vehicles were deployed in Afghanistan and continue to serve at home and abroad on peacekeeping missions. In service with the Joint Special Operations Command and Military Police.
Plasan SandCat		Israel	Patrol vehicle	—	27	4×4 armoured patrol vehicle used by the Military Police service. All vehicles are equipped with roof-mounted machine guns (manually operated PK or remote-controlled FN MAG).

=== Utility vehicles and trucks ===
==== Light vehicles ====
Model	Image	Origin	Type	Variant	Quantity	Notes
Mercedes-Benz G-Class		Austria; Germany	Armoured off-roader	G270 CDI	38	Model years 2003–2009. G270 CDI and G280 CDI are unarmoured. The armoured G270 CDI FB6 variants are equipped with a roof-mounted PK or NSVT machine gun. Used by the Land Forces, Joint Special Operations Command, Military Medical Academy and Military Police.
Mercedes-Benz G-Class		Austria; Germany	Armoured off-roader	G270 CDI FB6	27	Model years 2003–2009. G270 CDI and G280 CDI are unarmoured. The armoured G270 CDI FB6 variants are equipped with a roof-mounted PK or NSVT machine gun. Used by the Land Forces, Joint Special Operations Command, Military Medical Academy and Military Police.
Mercedes-Benz G-Class		Austria; Germany	Armoured off-roader	G280 CDI	35	Model years 2003–2009. G270 CDI and G280 CDI are unarmoured. The armoured G270 CDI FB6 variants are equipped with a roof-mounted PK or NSVT machine gun. Used by the Land Forces, Joint Special Operations Command, Military Medical Academy and Military Police.
Toyota Land Cruiser 79		United Arab Emirates Bulgaria Japan	Armoured off-roader		41 delivered in 2021	Manufactured by International Armoured Group. In use with the Joint Special Operations Command. Some are equipped with a roof-mounted PKM machine gun.
Toyota Land Cruiser 79		United Arab Emirates Bulgaria Japan	Armoured off-roader		22 delivered in February 2022	Manufactured by International Armoured Group. In use with the Joint Special Operations Command. Some are equipped with a roof-mounted PKM machine gun.
Ford Ranger		United States	Utility/Patrol vehicle	Ford Ranger T6 2.0L EcoBlue	318 with 318 more on order.	To replace the UAZ-469.
CFMoto ZFORCE Side-by-side vehicles		China	Utility off-roader	ZFORCE 950 SPORT-4	Unknown	Used by the 101st Alpine Regiment
UAZ-469		USSR	Patrol vehicle	UAZ-469	603	Off-road military light utility vehicle. To be replaced by the Ford Ranger
UAZ-469		USSR	Patrol vehicle	UAZ-469B	603	Off-road military light utility vehicle. To be replaced by the Ford Ranger
UAZ-452		USSR	Utility truck	UAZ-452	94	Off-road military light utility vehicle. Some units are used as ambulances.
UAZ-452		USSR	Utility truck	UAZ-3741	94	Off-road military light utility vehicle. Some units are used as ambulances.
Peugeot Boxer		France	Ambulance	Peugeot Boxer Third generation 4×4	51	Ambulance for the needs of the Bulgarian Army based on the Peugeot Boxer van.
Mercedes-Benz Sprinter		Germany	Transport van, Ambulance	Sprinter First Generation	~28	Some are used as ambulances for the Military Medical Academy.
Mercedes-Benz Sprinter		Germany	Transport van, Ambulance	Sprinter Second Generation	~28	Some are used as ambulances for the Military Medical Academy.

==== Trucks ====
Model	Image	Origin	Type	Variant	Quantity	Notes
Mercedes-Benz Actros		Germany		Actros 1317 A Actros 1832 A 4×4 Actros 3346 A 6×6 Actros 1841 LS 4×4 Actros 2732 AK 6×6 Actros 3641 AK 8×8 Actros 2023 AK	~108	The trucks were delivered in several batches in the 2000s until 2012.
Mercedes-Benz Zetros		Germany	6×6, 4×4 Off-road truck	Zetros 2733 A 6×6 Zetros 1833 4×4	~54	The trucks were delivered in several batches in the 2000s until 2012.
Mercedes-Benz Unimog		Germany	4×4 Unimog	Unimog U5000	~21	The trucks were delivered in several batches in the 2000s until 2012.
Tatra 815		Czechoslovakia; Czech Republic	8×8 Tactical Truck		N/A	Often seen towing D-20 howitzers. Used to transport personnel.
LIAZ 100 Madara		Czechoslovakia Bulgaria	Civilian truck	LIAZ 100.05	N/A	In service with the Armed Forces. Some are in reserve.
ZIL-131		USSR	6×6 General cargo truck		N/A	Most units are used for general cargo while some have a ZU-23-2 mounted in the back. There seems to be a number of these vehicles kept in reserve at storage facilities.
ZIL-130		USSR	Civilian truck		N/A	Used for general cargo.
GAZ-66		USSR	4×4 Off-road truck		N/A	Used for general cargo.
IFA W 50		East Germany			N/A	Used for general cargo.
KrAZ-255		USSR		KrAZ-255 6×6 KrAZ-256 6×4 KrAZ-257 6×4	N/A	Mainly used for specialized purposes like contemporary bridge, pontoon systems and as an excavator.
Ural 375D		USSR	6×6 multi-purpose truck		N/A	Used as a platform for BM-21 Grad, as a radar station and as a fuel tanker with the Air Force.
Ural-4320		USSR	6×6 multi-purpose truck		N/A	Used as a platform for P-18 radar, fuel tankers, command vehicles.
MAZ-537		USSR	8×8 Tank transporter		35	Used to transport bigger armoured vehicles like T-72 tanks, BMP-1, BMP-23, BTR-60.
Heavy Expanded Mobility Tactical Truck		United States	8×8 Tactical Truck	M1120A4 LHS M984A5 Wrecker M978A4 Fuel Servicing truck	15 /15	Bulgaria ordered 3 Heavy Expanded Mobility Tactical Truck (HEMTT) Light Equipment Transports; 3 M1120A4 HEMTT Load Handling Systems; 3 M984A4 Wrecker HEMTTs and 6 M978A4 HEMTT Fuel Servicing Trucks with the Stryker vehicles. To be delivered in 2025.

=== Engineering and recovery vehicles ===
Model	Image	Origin	Type	Quantity	Notes
EOV-4421		USSR	Excavator truck	N/A	Military excavator based on a KrAZ-255 truck.
PZM-2		USSR	Trench-digging machine	N/A	Trench-digging machine based on a T-150K wheeled tractor.
MT-LB		USSR	Armoured engineering vehicle	N/A	
MT-LB		USSR	Armoured recovery vehicle	N/A	
TV-62		USSR Bulgaria	Armoured recovery vehicle	N/A	Recovery vehicle based on a T-62 tank chassis.
BAT-M		USSR	Route-clearing vehicle	N/A	Based on the heavy AT-T tractor (itself based on a T-54 chassis). Used to clear minefields, create paths and dig trenches. Sometimes used during disaster relief operations.
BAT-2		USSR	Combat engineering vehicle	N/A	Unknown when it entered service or in what numbers. In use with the 55th Engineering Regiment and 2nd Mechanized Brigade.
MDK-2		USSR	Tracked trench-digging vehicle	N/A	Based on the heavy AT-T tractor (itself based on a T-54 chassis). Used for digging trenches.
BTM-3M		USSR	Tracked trench-digging vehicle	N/A	Based on the heavy AT-T tractor (itself based on a T-54 chassis).
ASTRA HD9 66.48		Italy	Recovery truck	1	6×6 recovery truck with a winch, crane and a heavy-duty under-lift. Additional orders may come in the future.
PTS		USSR	Tracked amphibious transporter	N/A	Entered service around 1969. Amphibious tracked transporter used by the Armed Forces.
BLG-60M2		USSR East Germany	Armoured vehicle-launched bridge	N/A	Mechanized bridge based on a T-55 tank chassis. Still in use.
PMP		USSR	Mobile pontoon bridge	N/A	Mobile pontoon bridge carried by a KrAZ-255 truck. The system also has a BMK-130 towing boat (carried separately) as part of the kit.
TMM-3M		USSR	Bridge laying vehicle	N/A	50 ton heavy mechanized bridge on KrAZ-255B truck chassis.

== Artillery ==
=== Self-propelled artillery ===
Model	Image	Origin	Type	Quantity	Notes
2S1 Gvozdika		USSR	Self-propelled howitzer	48	122-mm self-propelled howitzer (possibly up to 150 in reserve) Some 2S1s were purchased by Czechia and delivered to Ukraine.

=== Towed artillery ===
Model	Image	Origin	Type	Quantity	Notes
D-20		USSR	Howitzer	24	152-mm towed howitzer; standard heavy artillery piece of the Bulgarian Army. Some D-20s were purchased by Czechia and delivered to Ukraine.

=== Mortars ===
Model	Image	Origin	Type	Calibre	Notes
M6-211 Mortar		Bulgaria	Light mortar	60mm	Produced locally.
M82		USSR	Medium mortar	82mm	
2B11		USSR	Heavy mortar	120mm	Mounted on Tundzha B1-10 but could be used dismounted.

=== Ballistic missile ===
Model	Image	Origin	Type	Quantity	Notes
SS-21 Scarab-A		USSR	Tactical ballistic missile	N/A	The only remaining ballistic missile system from the now-disbanded Rocket Forces; 8 TELs and a classified quantity of missiles are left in service. As of 2023 the complex is still in service although it has been seen rarely.

=== MLRS ===
Model	Image	Origin	Type	Quantity	Notes
BM-21		USSR	Multiple rocket launcher	24	122-mm multiple-launch rocket system. Over 200 in reserve. Some BM-21s were purchased by Czechia and delivered to Ukraine. A modernization is planned in the future

=== Counter-battery radars ===
Model	Image	Origin	Type	Quantity	Notes
ARTHUR Mod C		Sweden	Counter-battery radar	~1	Operated by the 4th Artillery Regiment since late 2024 Mounted on a Tatra Force 4×4 truck.

== Unmanned vehicles ==
=== Drones ===
Model	Image	Origin	Type	Notes
Aerosonde Mk4.7		United States	Winged Surveillance/Reconnaissance UAV	The Aerosonde Mk 4.7 was developed for aerial reconnaissance, surveillance, obtaining information on ground and moving targets. The system can also be used as a means of conducting reconnaissance of artillery targets. One system (3 UAV) in service.
Telesys TERES-02		Bulgaria	Winged Surveillance/Reconnaissance UAV	Bulgarian made UAV. Used by the Land Forces since 2025. Two systems with three UAVs each (one each equipped with SAR) in service.
AeroVironment RQ-11 Raven		United States	Winged Surveillance/Reconnaissance UAV	The RQ-11 Raven is a small hand-launched remote-controlled unmanned aerial vehicle.The Bulgarian Land Forces operate the RQ-11 since 2015.
Boeing Insitu MQ-27 ScanEagle		United States	Winged Surveillance/Reconnaissance UAV	The ScanEagle has been in use with the Land Forces since 2025.
Aquilla		Greece	VTOL Surveillance/Reconnaissance UAV	12 Systems with 36 Drones acquired through tactical reconnaissance UAV program.
DJI Mini 3 Pro		China	Quadcopter	Compact quadcopter drone used by the Land Forces.
DJI Matrice		China	Quadcopter	Industrial quadcopter drone used by the Land Forces.

=== Robots ===
Model	Image	Origin	Type	Notes
TALON		United States	Bomb disposal robot	Used by the Bulgarian Land Forces for explosive ordinance disposal.
PackBot 510		United States	Bomb disposal robot	Used by the Bulgarian Land Forces for explosive ordinance disposal. The robot also has the ability to climb stairs.

== Communications ==
Model	Image	Origin	Type	Notes
R-412		USSR	Tactical troposcatter relay	Mounted on a KamAZ truck.
Radio access vehicle		unknown	Radio access vehicle	Provides radio communication to field command posts via HF, VHF and UHF radios and connection to ANCMO TETRA. Mounted on a Mercedes-Benz Unimog U5000 truck.
Radio relay vehicle		unknown	Radio relay vehicle	Designed to provide communication and information services via radio relay and fiber channels to the command post. Mounted on a Mercedes-Benz Unimog U5000 truck.

== Potential/future acquisitions ==
Model	Image	Origin	Type	Quantity	Notes
New 5.56×45mm NATO rifles for the Joint Special Operations Command		Unknown	Assault rifle	Unknown	To replace current Special Forces rifles.
New 5.56×45mm NATO Light machine guns for the Joint Special Operations Command		Unknown	Light machine gun	Unknown	To replace current Special Forces LMGs.
New 7.62×51mm NATO General-purpose machine guns for the Joint Special Operations Command		Unknown	General-purpose machine guns	Unknown	To replace current Special Forces GPMGs.
Springfield Armory Echelon		Croatia	Handgun	4 327	There is a project to buy a new handgun, which would replace the Makarov as the standard-issue pistol of the Bulgarian Land Forces. The selected pistol is the Springfield Armory Echelon.
New Designated marksman rifles for the Land Forces		Unknown	Designated marksman rifle	Unknown	The land forces have initiated a procurement order to buy DMRs to replace the SVD.
CAESAR		France	155 mm Self propelled howitzer	3 Mk I & 54 Mk II	The Bulgarian Ministry of Defence plans to acquire new 155 mm artillery systems.Some of the requirements are for the artillery to be wheeled for mobility and to have an armoured hull. Bulgaria has chosen the CAESAR to be its new 155 mm SPH and a contract is expected in the near future. On November 16, 2026, the Bulgarian Government ratified the order for 3 CAESAR Mark I and 54 Mark II units for planned delivery by the end of 2030. Purchased under the SAFE mechanism the total cost will be 686 million euros and will be ordered together with other European countries.
Ground Master 400 3D radars		France	Early warning radar	Five stationary and two mobile	The French Thales Defense and Security was chosen for the acquisition of the GM400a radars. The radars will be used by the Bulgarian Air Force.
Naval Strike Missile		Norway	Coastal Anti-ship missiles	1 Battery with 4 launchers and 16 missiles.	On July 21, 2025, the US State Department approved a sale of Naval Strike Missile system to Bulgaria worth $620 million. The Naval Strike Missile is intended to replace the 4K51 Rubezh that has been in use by the Bulgarian Navy since the late 1980s. Kongsberg has also offered to integrate the Naval Strike Missile onto the Wielingen-class frigates of the Bulgarian Navy.
Brigade Air Defence System (SHORAD)		Unknown	Short range air defense	Unknown(2-4 Battalions)	
New Trucks		Unknown	Tactical truck	320	To replace all Soviet trucks in use with the Land Forces
PULS		Israel	Multiple Launch Rocket System	12	The Bulgarian Ministry of Defence and The Chief of Defence are interested in acquiring a MLRS system for the Bulgarian Land Forces. The favorite for the project is the M142 HIMARS with the PULS and K239 Chunmoo also being considered. There is information that the MoD has decided to give up on the M142 HIMARS, because of its increased price and to move on with the PULS. Bulgaria has asked to acquire 12 PULS systems under the SAFE program.
Unmanned combat aerial vehicles		Unknown	Medium-altitude long-endurance UAV	8-24	To be used by the Bulgarian Air Force.

== Retired equipment ==
- L3/33
- Vickers 6-ton
- Panzer 35(t)
- Panzer 38(t)
- Hotchkiss H35
- Renault R35
- Panzer IV
- PT-76 amphibious tanks (250)
- T-62 tanks (250, sold to Ethiopia, Yemen and Angola
- PTS
- T-55AM2 tanks (1,400 kept in storage in the province of Montana)
- T-34 tanks (177, some sold to Mali and other African countries; 42 kept in storage near the village of Ohrid, Bulgaria; some are used as anti-tank weapons targets; the rest of the tanks were scrapped)
- Sturmgeschütz III
- SU-100
- SU-85
- 2S3 Akatsiya
- Leichter Panzerspähwagen
- BA-64
- BRDM-1
- BTR-152
- BTR-40
- BTR-50PU
- SS-23 (8 launchers + 24 missiles, destroyed)
- FROG-7 (24 launchers + dozens of missiles, destroyed)
- Scud-B (36 launchers + dozens of missiles, destroyed)
- AT-1 Snapper anti-tank guided missiles
- BM-13 multiple rocket launchers
- RM-51 multiple rocket launchers
- ZSU-57-2
- ZSU-23-4 Shilka
- 9K31 Strela-1
- 9K35 Strela-10
- 2K11 Krug

== See also ==
- Defense industry of Bulgaria
