= Rangpur Metropolitan Police =

Specialized police unit of the Bangladesh Police

Rangpur Metropolitan Police রংপুর মেট্রোপলিটিন পুলিশ
- Common name: Metropolitan Police
- Abbreviation: RPMP

Agency overview
- Formed: September 16, 2018

Jurisdictional structure
- Operations jurisdiction: Rangpur, Bangladesh
- Area: 239.72 km^{2} (92.56 sq mi)
- Population: 685,754 (2022)
- Governing body: Ministry of Home Affairs
- Constituting instrument: Rangpur Metropolitan Police Act,2018
- General nature: Local civilian police

Operational structure
- Headquarters: Kacharibazar, Rangpur
- Minister responsible: Salahuddin Ahmed, Minister of Home Affairs
- Agency executive: DIG Md Abdul Mabud, Police Commissioner
- Parent agency: Bangladesh Police
- Special Units: Detective Branch

Facilities
- Stations: 6
- Armored vehicles: Otokar Cobra, IAG Guardian, STREIT Typhoon
- Helicopters: Bell 407

Website
- rpmp.gov.bd
- Service uniform: Yankees Blue, Light French Beige; Combat uniform: Oak Brown, Brown Derby

The Rangpur Metropolitan Police (Bengali: রংপুর মেট্রোপলিটন পুলিশ, romanized: Raṅpur mēṭrōpaliṭana puliśa; abbreviated as RPMP) is the primary metropolitan unit of the Bangladesh Police, responsible for law enforcement, public safety, and crime prevention within the metropolis of Rangpur, a major city in northern Bangladesh. Established in 2018 under the Rangpur Metropolitan Police Ordinance, RMP oversees policing operations, administration, and coordination with other law enforcement and emergency agencies in the city. The force is headed by a Police Commissioner who manages all operational and administrative functions.

== History ==
The government of Bangladesh announced plans to establish the Rangpur Metropolitan Police and Gazipur Metropolitan Police in December 2015 in a cabinet meeting chaired by Prime Minister Sheikh Hasina.

The cabinet approved the draft of a law to establish the Rangpur Metropolitan Police.

The Rangpur Metropolitan Police was established by the "Rangpur Metropolitan Police Act, 2018" passed in the National Assembly of Bangladesh on 12 April 2018.

In April 2019, the Kotwali police station officer-in-charge was accused of sexual harassment of a female councillor who had gone to the police station.

Nazmul Quader, officer in charge of Haragach Police Station of Rangpur Metropolitan Police, was closed for letting a rapist go from police custody in February 2020.

Justices Mamnoon Rahman and Khandaker Diliruzzaman of Bangladesh High Court issued an order asking the Rangpur Metropolitan Police to explain the custodial death of a man in November 2021.

== Police stations ==
- Kotwali Thana
- Parshuram Thana
- Haragach Thana
- Tajhat Thana
- Mahiganj Thana
- Hazirhat Thana
