= 68th Special Forces Brigade =

- 68-ма Бригада Специални Сили
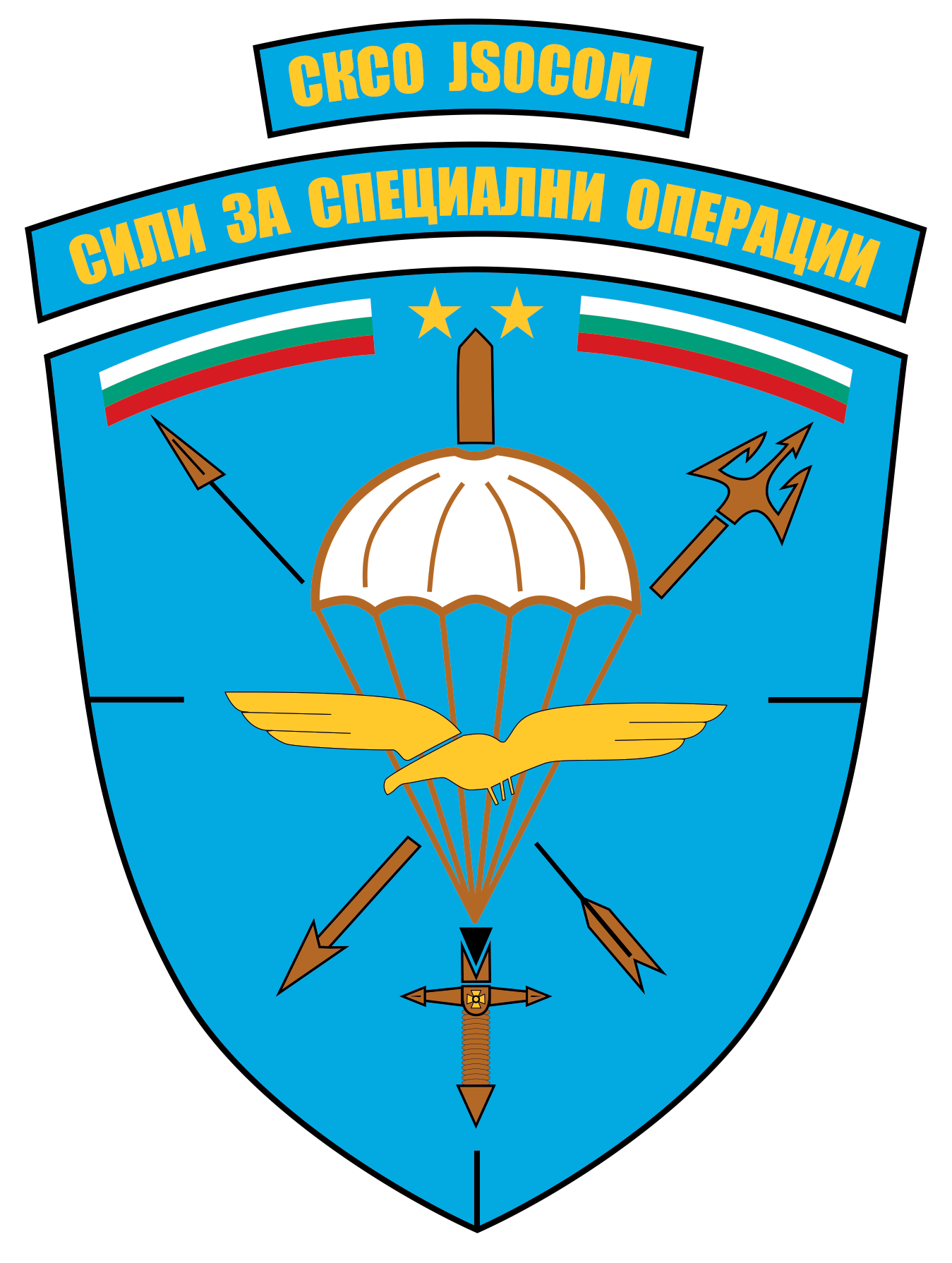
- Logo of the Bulgarian Joint Special Operations Command since 2019
- Active: 1942–present
- Country: Bulgaria
- Type: Special forces
- Role: Counter-terrorism, combat search and rescue, expeditionary warfare, airborne troops, unconventional warfare, direct actions, counter-insurgency, special reconnaissance.
- Size: Classified
- Garrison/HQ: Plovdiv
- Mottos: Там, където другите не могат (There, where the others can't); Славата е за Родината, За нас – доблестт (The glory is for the Motherland, For us – the valor)
- Anniversaries: 18 March
- Engagements: World War 2, Stracin-Kumanovo operation, Iraq War, War in Afghanistan (2001-2021)
- Website: https://jsocom.armf.bg/

Commanders
- Current commander: Brigadier General Bozhidar Boikov

Aircraft flown
- Cargo helicopter: Mi-8 / Mi-17 /Eurocopter AS532

The 68th Special Forces Brigade (or 68th Brigade of Special Forces) was the old name of the unconventional warfare branch of the Bulgarian Armed Forces. It is an independent branch under the direct command of the Chief of Defence since February 1, 2017. Before that, the brigade was within the force structure of the Land Forces. It was one of two Bulgarian military special operations units, the second one being the Naval Special Reconnaissance Detachment (Морски Специален Разузнавателен Отряд or МСРО), a combat frogmen unit, retained within the structure of the Bulgarian Navy. The 68th SF Brigade was transformed into the Joint Special Operations Command (Bulgarian: Съвместно командване на специалните операции) on November 1, 2019. Тhe headquarters is located in Plovdiv.

== History ==
=== Origins ===
The first parachute jumps made in Bulgaria date from 1927, when Otto Heinicke made an initial demonstration of his pilot rescue parachute at the Bozhurishte airfield before subsequent test jumps were made by Bulgarian Second Lieutenants Boris Stoev, Hristo Hristov, Vasil Velkov, and Boris Tsvetanov. However, the demonstration was a proof of concept due to the Treaty of Neuilly-sur-Seine after World War I, which prohibited Bulgaria from having an air force. A civilian aviation organisation was established as the Aviation Agency under the Ministry of Railways, where the officer ranks of the Bulgarian pilots were kept in complete secrecy.

The actual beginning of Bulgarian military parachuting dates from the autumn of 1940, when a decision by the Ministry for War and the Armed Forces Staff was made for the formation of a parachute company in the Air Force in 1941. This was postponed until 1942, when a training parachute company stood up for the theoretical preparation of personnel. As many as 5,000 junior officers and conscripts born in 1920 and 1921 took the exams for the new unit before a commission, including German parachutist officers seconded for the preparation of the new unit. As a result, about 300 men were selected. In December 1942, two groups of Bulgarian paratrooper candidates left for Germany to train at the Luftwaffe's Paratroops School 3 (Fallschirmschule 3) at Braunschweig-Broitzem. The first group of 144 men was headed by Captain Lyubomir Noev (the future commander of the Parachute Druzhina) and the second group of 146 men, which followed several days later, was headed by Captain Georgi Alaykov (who took over the druzhina after the death of Noev).

Bulgaria is one of the few countries in the world that has developed its own operational and tactical doctrine for the use of paratrooper forces. The reason for that is the context of its actions during the war. The Kingdom of Bulgaria was a very reluctant ally of the Third Reich. Other than the two army corps that the Bulgarian Army contributed to occupation duties in Yugoslavia and Greece in regions predominantly inhabited by compact ethnic Bulgarians, the only Bulgarian contribution to the war (and an indirect one at that) was a Bulgarian field hospital train at the Eastern Front, manned by the Bulgarian Red Cross. This led to widespread distrust of the Bulgarians by the Germans. The German instructors at Paratroopers School 3 blatantly refused to train the Bulgarian cadets in combat tactics, limiting the course to technical training and details about parachute systems, transport aviation, and the planning of parachute jumps. Moreover, the instructors at the school also put the Bulgarians to use as Guinea pigs for the evaluation of a new type of German parachute system. The first three jumps were conducted according to the training syllabus for Junkers Ju 52-m3 transport aircraft and the standard parachute system and went uneventful with excellent results. For the fourth jump, the instructors decided to experiment with the use of the RS-20 system (still in development) from the bomb bays of Heinkel He 111 bombers from 300 meters height and speed of 350 km/h, assuring the Bulgarian officers, that this is a standard procedure. This experiment lead to several injuries, including the first casualty of a Bulgarian paratrooper - Private Georgi Shterionov from Burgas, who died at the ground impact. The Bulgarian personnel went on hunger strike in protest and 9 soldiers were put under arrest as instigators.

The standard German parachute training course was a three-week course of instruction, and the Bulgarian paratroopers who completed the course were awarded German paratrooper badges. In the summer of 1943, a German parachute training detachment of approximately a dozen men was sent to Sofia to assist in the training of the Bulgarian parachute battalion, including at least two veterans of the Battle of Crete. In the photographs of the detachment in Sofia, the German trainers are seen wearing Bulgarian paratrooper badges in addition to their German badges, and the Bulgarian officers are also seen wearing both awards. The German training detachment remained in Sofia until the Fall of 1943. Photographs of the German and Bulgarian officers together in Sofia, including Captain Noev, show that the relationship was cordial and comradely.

The Minister for War's order for the formation of the unit dates from 18 March 1943 and its location was decided to be the Vrazhdebna airfield (present day Sofia IAP). It was called a Parachute Druzhina Druzhina (дружина) was the traditional word used for an infantry battalion in the Kingdom of Bulgaria, roughly translated as a camaraderie. The initial temporary force structure of the unit was:

- Commander (Командир)
- Staff (Щаб, 11 men)
- First Parachute Company (Първа парашутна рота of three parachute platoons)
- Second Parachute Company (Втора парашутна рота of three parachute platoons)
- Special Platoon (Специален взвод, the unit's logistical part)

The total manpower accounted 287 men. This number grew by 10 NCO medics on 15 May, when they returned from their parachute training in Germany. On 14 June 10 soldiers were sent to the Reserve Officers School of the Air Troops in Kazanlak (Школа за запасни офицери към Въздушните войски) as the air force (the paratroopers' mother service) was called at the time, to attend a reserve officers training course for the parachute troops in order to facilitate the growth of the battalion. This was the beginning of preparing paratroopers in Bulgaria itself.

A ministerial order dated 30 November 1943 established the new (permanent) battalion force structure:

- Staff (Щаб, 123 men), including:
  - Command Section (Отделение за командване of 19 men)
  - Signals Platoon (Свързочен взвод of 45 men)
  - Bicycle-Motorised Platoon (Колоездачно – мотоциклетен взвод of 23 men)
  - Supply Platoon (Домакински взвод of 23 men)
- First Light Parachute Company (Първа лекопарашутна рота of three parachute platoons)
- Second Light Parachute Company (Втора лекопарашутна рота of three parachute platoons)
- Third Light Parachute Company (Трета лекопарашутна рота of three parachute platoons), each of them of 173 men including:
  - Command Section of 39 men
  - 3 light parachute platoons of 45 men each
- Heavy Parachute Company (Тежкопарашутна рота of 209 men), including:
  - Command Section of 41 men
  - 1st and 2nd Heavy Machine Parachute Gun of 41 men each
  - Mortar Parachute Platoon of 43 men
  - 20mm Anti-Tank Parachute Platoon of 43 men
- Combat Engineer Assault Company (Пионерно – щурмова рота of 183 men), including:
  - Command Section of 48 men
  - 1st, 2nd and 3rd Combat Engineer Assault Platoons of 45 men each
- Medical Parachute Platoon (Санитарен парашутен взвод of 29 men)
- Transport Squadron (Транспортно ято of 208 men and 6 Ju-52-m3 aircraft)

Overall this unique reinforced battalion of His Majesty's Air Troops had a man strength of 1 251 men, including 55 officers, 231 NCOs, 960 soldiers and 5 civilian clerks.

On 10 February 1944 an NCO School was formed in the Parachute Druzhina for the training of section commanders at a six-month course. The battalion was a specialized infantry unit, with the main difference from the regular infantry being its parachute training and its main armament - sub-machine guns of German (Schmeisser MP-40), Czechoslovak (Zbrojovka ZK-383 (M-27)) and Finnish (Suomi M-31) origin. Unlike the regular Bulgarian infantry the paratroopers were also standard issued German Parabellum pistols. Their combat attire followed the German pattern with camouflage coats, submachine guns etc. and this visual recognition made their deployment along regular units fighting the Germans problematic later on. In the autumn of 1943 the Allied bombings of Sofia escalated and most of the battalion's manpower (minus 75 men staying behind in Vrazhdebna) was re-located to Telish airfield near Pleven on 28 January 1944. The unit was reunited on 11 September (after the Communist coup on 9 September). Bulgaria joined the Allies and declared war on the Third Reich. On the insistence of the paratroopers themselves the Parachute Druzhina was subordinated to the First Bulgarian Army, leaving for the front in Yugoslavia on 10 October and arriving in the village of Poeshevo the same day. The battalion deployed 429 men. They entered combat on 18 October at the Battle of Stracin (assaulting the German fortified positions on the Strashin ridge) and this officially became the Day of the Parachutist - the official day commemorating the Bulgarian paratroopers. The battle was part of the Bulgarian Army's Stratsim-Kumanovo Offensive Operation with the goal to cut off the direction for retreat from Greece of the Wehrmacht's Army Group E. During its operational deployment of a month and a half the Parachute druzhina fought several formations of the Wehrmacht in Macedonia, including the 7th SS Volunteer Mountain Division Prinz Eugen, achieving several victories.

The order for the unification of the Parachute Druzhina and the Mixed Parachute Druzhina under the original Parachute Druzhina title from January 1945 established the following force structure of the unit:

- Staff Company (Щабна рота, including the battalion commander and 29 men)
- 1st Light Parachute Company (1ва Лекопарашутна рота, including commander and 51 men)
- 2nd Light Parachute Company (2ра Лекопарашутна рота, including commander and 49 men)
- Heavy Parachute Company (Тежкопарашутна рота, the heavy weapons company, including commander and 52 men)
- Combat Engineer Assault Company (Пионеро-щурмова рота, including commander and 45 men)
- Supply Platoon (Домакински взвод, including commander and 11)
- NCO School (formed on 8 March 1945)

Lt.-Col. Mitev remained in command of the battalion for two months only due to his utter lack of expertise. He was previously an officer in the gendarmery, the infantry and in the Air Force Staff. Therefore, the Ministry of War had to reluctantly reinstate Major Alaykov as battalion commander. In October 1945 the Parachute Druzhina relocated from Vrazhdebna airfield to Bozhurishte airfield, both in the vicinity of Sofia. On 30 December 1945 28 paratroopers were decorated with their second "For Bravery" medal and on 25 April 1947 9 officers were awarded the Officer's Grade "For Bravery". In the summer of 1946 the German-trained paratrooper officers were purged from the army, except for Major Alaykov, because there was still no competent officer to replace him in command. On 17 November 1947 Major Stefan Kalapchiev was instated as battalion commander and Alaykov was retired. Later during his career Kalapchiev achieved a legendary status among the Bulgarian paratroopers. In December 1947 the battalion relocated to Kolyo Ganchevo airfield near Stara Zagora. Later the village was incorporated into the city and the airfield itself became the combined military Stara Zagora airbase / civilian Stara Zagora Airport. In the years following WWII the Bulgarian Army fully assumed the Soviet military traditions and procedures. As part of that the cavalry arms was disbanded along with the disuse of the cavalry term "squadron" and the infantry druzhinas were renamed to battalions. In 1948 the Parachute Druzhina (Парашутна дружина) became an Air-Landing Battalion (Въздушно-десантен батальон), Military Unit 8300. Major Kalapchiev lead a very purpose oriented, which established him as an eccentric officer among his peers and brought him in conflict with members of other armed and security services. In 1949 Kalapchiev and 17 of his paratroopers made a jump on the Stara Zagora prison and "freed" the prisoners, which brought him at odds with the Ministry of Justice officials. A year later in 1950 paratroopers made a jump on an elite Internal Troops unit of the Ministry of the Interior (nicknamed "Baykaltsi"). Other unconventional exercises of the airborne battalion are jumps on the roof of Stara Zagora railway station and on the cemetery of the city.

In the autumn of 1950 the Parachute Landing Battalion relocated from Kolyo Ganchevo to Pleven and changed its Military Unit number from 8300 to 25140. Major Kalapchiev was put in charge of the Higher Air Force School at Vrazhdebna airfield and Major Ivaylo Dobrinov took over the battalion. On 15 February 1951 the Parachute Landing Battalion changed its designation to Parachute Reconnaissance Battalion was transferred from the Air Force to the Intelligence Department of the General Staff, thus officially starting the second (much longer) period of Bulgarian parachute units - parachute reconnaissance and special operations. In 1952 the battalion relocated again from Pleven to the village of Krushuna (in Lovech district at the foothills of the Balkan (Stara Planina mountain)).

=== Birth of the Special Forces ===
On 15 February 1951, the Parachute Landing Battalion changed its designation to Parachute Reconnaissance Battalion and was transferred from the Air Force to the Intelligence Department of the General Staff. In 1952 the battalion relocated to Krushuna. In 1954 the Parachute Reconnaissance Battalion was disbanded and three of the Bulgarian front-line rifle divisions formed airborne battalions (in Yambol, Haskovo and Kardzhali). In 1958 these airborne battalions were converted to motor rifle battalions.

In October 1957 the Intelligence Department of the General Staff formed a parachute reconnaissance in Krushuna again - the Training Parachute Reconnaissance Base (Учебна-парашутно-разузнавателна база (УПРБ)) with Military Unit number 85070. At first the unit was of company size. On 23 November 1959 it expanded to battalion equivalent and a year later relocated to the village of Chelopechene (just to the east of Sofia, a major military base during the Cold War). In April 1961 the Training Parachute Reconnaissance Base became 86th Training Parachute Reconnaissance Base - General Staff Reserve (86та УПРБ – РГК).In December 1961 the unit relocated again to Musachevo (another major military base during the Cold War to the east of Sofia).

Also in 1959 three Parachute Reconnaissance Companies were formed under each of the three Bulgarian armies as army counterparts to the General Staff's 86th TPRB. The three para-recon companies were located near the armies headquarters (in Sofia, Plovdiv and Sliven). The three army para-recon companies were structured in:

- Commander
- Command Section (manning an R-118 radio truck)
- 1st, 2nd and 3rd Reconnaissance Groups
- 4th Diversionary Group (direct action and assault)

The three recon and the diversionary group had identical composition of:

- Commanding Officer
- Deputy Commander (Staff Sergeant)
- 2 reconnaissance gatherers
- 2 radio men
- 2 demolition men
- 2 chemical men

The group had 1 R-350 radio set for communication with the Company HQ, 2 R-352 radios for section communication and also R-306 and R-330 radios. The annual quotas were set at 70 parachute jumps for the officers and 50 parachute jumps for the NCOs and lower ranks, plus 10 jumps in army competitions.

In 1964 the Ministry of People's Defense decided to merge the three army para-recon companies in the 68th Training Parachute Reconnaissance Base - General Staff Reserve (68ма УПРБ – РГК) in parallel to the identical 86th. The new 68th TPRB was based in Plovdiv. The force structure included:

- Commander
- Staff
- Command Group
- 1st, 2nd and 3rd Parachute Reconnaissance Companies of
  - 3x Parachute Reconnaissance Groups

The officers and NCOs had an annual quota of 40 parachute jumps.

In the autumn of 1966 the three Bulgarian armies raised para-recon companies yet again - the 1st Army Parachute Reconnaissance Company (1ва Армейска парашутно-разузнавателна рота (1ва АПРР)) in Sofia, the 2nd near Plovdiv and the 3rd in Sliven.

The naming of the Training Parachute Reconnaissance Base of the special forces units was in the spirit of the Soviet Maskirovka also widely applied by the Soviet Cold War allies and these were operational special operations units, concentrating their capabilities mostly on wartime actions against the two NATO member countries in the region - Greece (the 86th TPRB) and Turkey (the 68th TPRB). The Bulgarian paratroopers achieved very high levels of proficiency and combat readiness and this was illustrated at such occasions as the "Brotherhood in Arms '70" major exercise of the Warsaw Pact Organisation, held in the German Democratic Republic. With a lower border of the cloud cover less than 200 meters all the other Warsaw Pact members parachute contingents (including the Soviet VDV and GRU-Spetsnaz) refused to make the jump. A combined force of 180 Bulgarian paratroopers from the 68th and 86th TPRB jumped from the An-12 cargo transports, which came as a complete surprise for the Warsaw Pact's high-ranking officials at the site, when their canopies emerged from the clouds. According to eyewitnesses at the command post the Soviet Minister of Defence Marshal Andrei Grechko asked surprised "Who are these men?", to which the Bulgarian Minister of People's Defence Army General Dobri Dzhurov to save the Soviet's face and to boast how the Bulgarian para-recon forces match the GRU-Spetsnaz capabilities replied "This is Soviet Spetsnaz based on the Balkans, Comrade Marshal." On 10 May 1972 the 68th TPRB Commander Lt.-Col. Anastasov was promoted ahead of time served in that rank to a Colonel. This was an exception of the rules and he was the only BPA's full Colonel battalion commander, due to his achievements, among others the exemplary participation of the Bulgarian paratroopers at the exercise in East Germany in 1970.

The two TPRBs were subordinated to the Bulgarian People's Army's Intelligence Directorate of the General Staff (Разузнавателно управление на Генералния щаб (РУ-ГЩ)). In 1973 with the formation of the Land Forces Command (as a Frontal Headquarters during wartime) they were transferred under the Intelligence Directorate of the Land Forces Command (Разузнавателно управление на Командването на сухопътните войски (РУ-КСВ)). For their direction a Spetsnaz Division (Oтдел "Спецназ") was formed within the Intelligence Directorate, headed by Colonel Iliya Iliev.

=== The 68th Regiment ===
On 1 October 1975 the 68th and 86th Training Parachute-Reconnaissance Bases were merged in the newly created 68th Independent Parachute-Reconnaissance Regiment "Spetsnaz" (68ми Oтделен парашутно-разузнавателен полк „СПЕЦНАЗ" (68-ми ОПРП „СПЕЦНАЗ”)) under the command of the 68th TPRB Commander Col. Anastasov. The regiment included:

- Command
- Headquarters
- Signals company
- Two parachute-reconnaissance battalions (the previous 68th and 86th TPRBs)
- Diversionary-reconnaissance detachment
- A training para-recon battalion
- Automobile company
- Rear services [logistics]

Also in 1975 the three army parachute-reconnaissance companies were expanded into battalions. Their tasks included next to their readiness to execute reconnaissance and direct actions on the enemy in wartime also to play the role of "aggressor" units or special operations OPFOR to the regular units of the Bulgarian People's Army and the Ministry of the Interior. Another highlight of their training and demonstration of skills was the major Warsaw Treaty Organisation exercise of 1982 - "Shield '82", held in Bulgaria.

== Post Cold War to present day ==
On 30 July 1993 the 68th Independent Parachute-Reconnaissance Regiment "Spetsnaz" (68ми Oтделен парашутно-разузнавателен полк „СПЕЦНАЗ" (68-ми ОПРП „СПЕЦНАЗ”)) under Colonel Toma Damyanov was restructured into 68th Parachute-Reconnaissance Brigade "Spetsnaz" and once again put under the Intelligence Directorate of the General Staff (Разузнавателно управление на Генералния щаб (РУ-ГЩ)).

In the period after the Cold War the Bulgarian Army went through a period of constant restructuring and downsizing. In the summer of 1998 the three army para-recon battalions were disbanded and concentrated in the new 18th Parachute-Reconnaissance Regiment (18ти Парашутно-разузнавателен полк (18ти ПРП)) in Sliven under Col. Nacho Nachev. The 18th Para-Recon Regiment was subordinated to the Intelligence Directorate of the Land Forces Command (Разузнавателно управление на Командването на сухопътните войски (РУ-КСВ)) in the same way as the 68th Para-Recon Brigade was subordinated to the Intelligence Directorate of the General Staff. Each of the two directorates had a "Spetsnaz" staff division, dedicated to directing their respective units.

=== Special Operations Forces Command ===
Another reorganization in the year 2000 the Spetsnaz Staff Division of the General Staff's Intelligence Directorate and the Spetsnaz Staff Division of the Land Forces Command's Intelligence Directorate merged to form the General Staff's Special Operations Forces Command (Командване сили за специални операции (КССО)), transferred a year later under the Land Forces Command and headed by Brigade General Samandov. The new command was headquartered in Plovdiv and included the:

- 68th Special Operations Forces Brigade (Plovdiv)
- 1st Parachute-Reconnaissance Regiment (Sliven, previously the 18th Para-Recon Regt)
- 34th Psychological Operations Battalion (in Musachevo near Sofia, later renumbered to 1st)

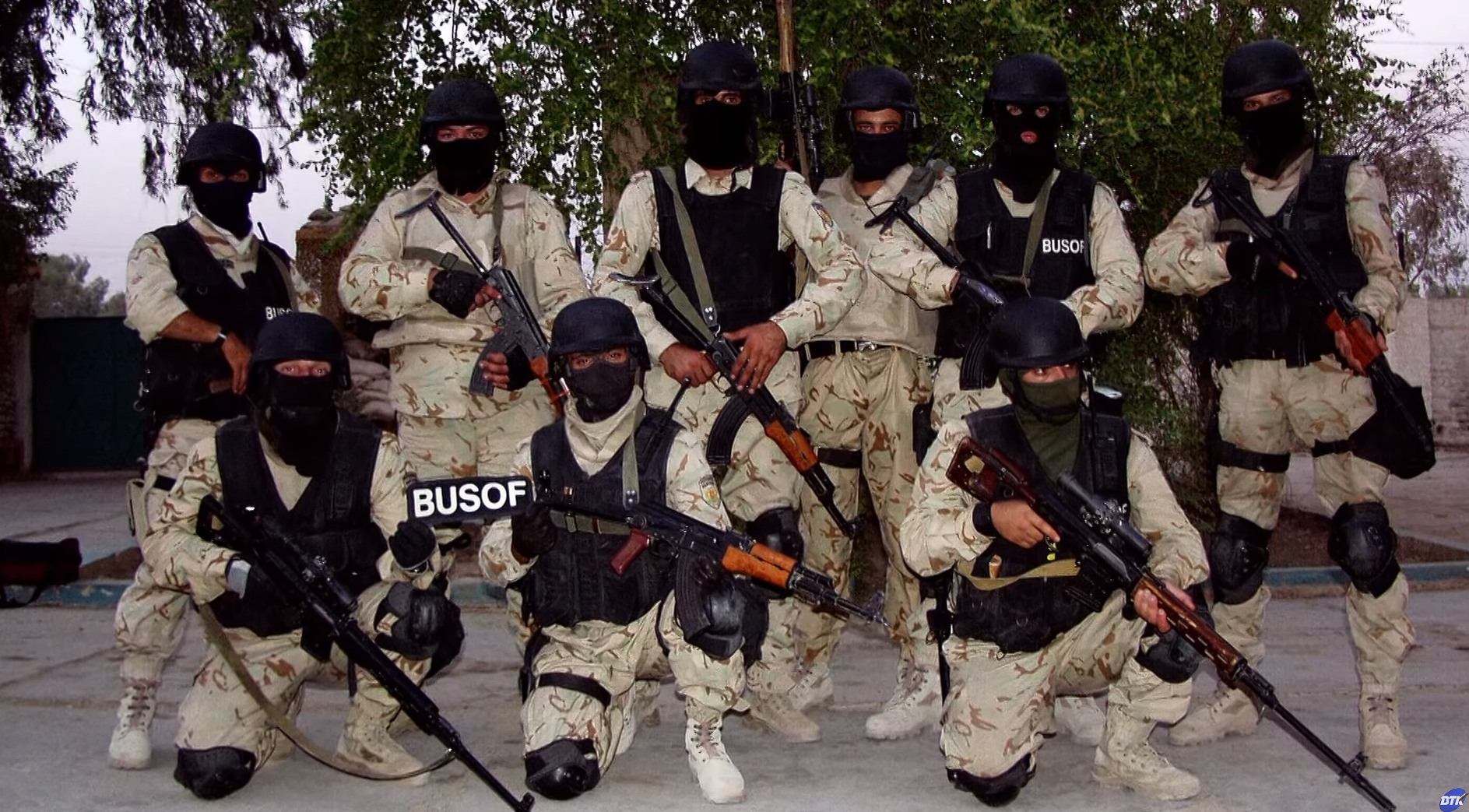
Bulgarian special forces during the Iraq War, 2003.

The deep economic crisis of Bulgaria during the 1990s and the beginning of the 2000s brought heavy problems for the Command and for the Bulgarian Army as a whole. The SOFC's commander Brigade General Atanas Samandov's inability to address them and his lack of understanding for the specifics of special operations (coming from a conventional forces background) brought resentment amongst the ranks and members of the Special Forces resentfully categorised him as the "special forces commander without a single parachute jump". The circumstances brought a deep deterioration in the capabilities of the Bulgarian army special forces. The endemic lack of funding in the Bulgarian Army contributed significantly to that and their reintroduction into the Land Forces made things even worse. The new Bulgarian geo-political orientation towards NATO and the EU meant that the country would have to take a more active part in missions overseas, with the Land Forces taking the brunt of that. Yet their state of disrepair and the higher readiness and manpower capabilities of the 68th SOF Brigade meant that a considerable number of its personnel would take part in those missions, relegated merely to conventional light infantry.

In 2006 the Special Operations Forces Command was disbanded and a "Special Forces" Staff Division within the General Staff was formed. In 2007 the 1st Para-Recon Regiment was disbanded and inducted as the 3rd SOF-Battalion into the 68th SOF Brigade. Later, according to the plan for the structure of the forces in 2015 the 101st Mountain Infantry Brigade (reduced to battalion size in peacetime) was transformed into an actual battalion and absorbed into the 68th SOF Brigade.

=== Modern day ===
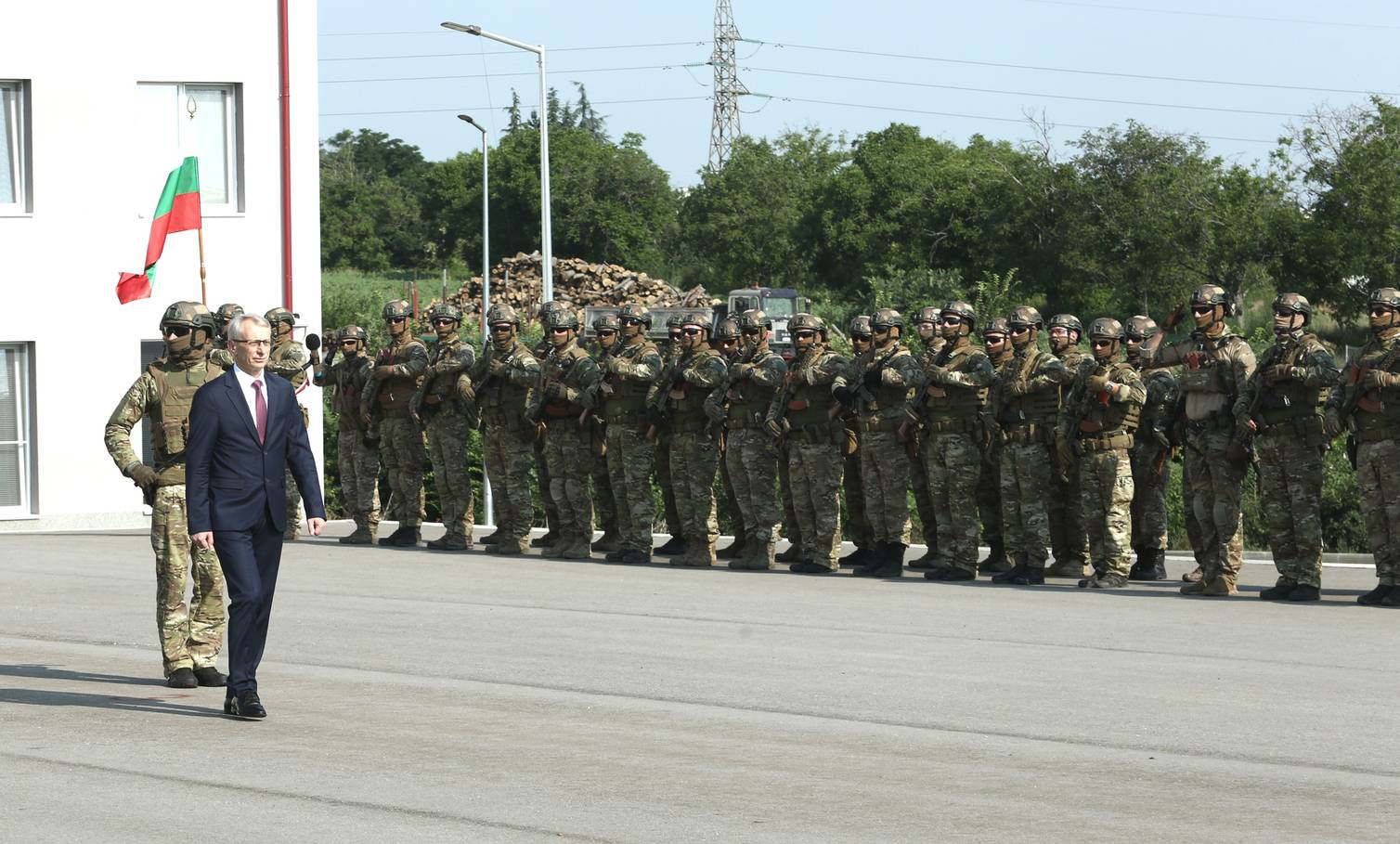
Former Prime Minister Nikolai Denkov with operators from the Joint Special Operations Command

With the increased threat of international terrorist organizations in the 2000s and 2010s the 68th Special Operations Forces Brigade, renamed to 68th Brigade of Special Forces (68ма Бригада специални сили) underwent a moderate renaissance in its special capabilities. The brigade has deep training ties with similar foreign formations, especially the US Army's 10th Special Forces Group, but also the Portuguese Special Forces Brigade in Lamego, the Greek, Romanian and the Serbian Special operations forces etc. The brigade has renewed its stocks of weapons (of mostly Heckler & Koch and Barrett manufacture, but also relying heavily on Arsenal AD Bulgarian manufactured weapons), special equipment and mobility inventory Mercedes-Benz Zetros, Actros, G-Wagons, Unimog, HMMWV etcetera. It is compatible with NATO operational standards and procedures and its 68th Special Operations Group is attached to the NATO Quick Reaction Forces until 31 December 2023. The exact structure is not publicly known, but it is around 1500 service members roughly from:

- Command and Staff
- Command Company
- Signals Company
- 1st, 3rd, 68th and 86th Special Operations Groups.
- 68th Special Operations Group (68-та Група Специални Сили.) - The Special Operations Group was certified by NATO officials during the ''Stealth Dagger 22'' multinational exercise held in Bulgaria and from 1 January until 31 December 2023 will be on high alert as part of the Special Operations Component Command of the NRF–23 NATO Response Force.
- Special Forces Training Center at the brigade garrison in Plovdiv, including a Kill House, parachute simulation tower etc.
- Tsrancha Special Forces Training Range
- Logistical units
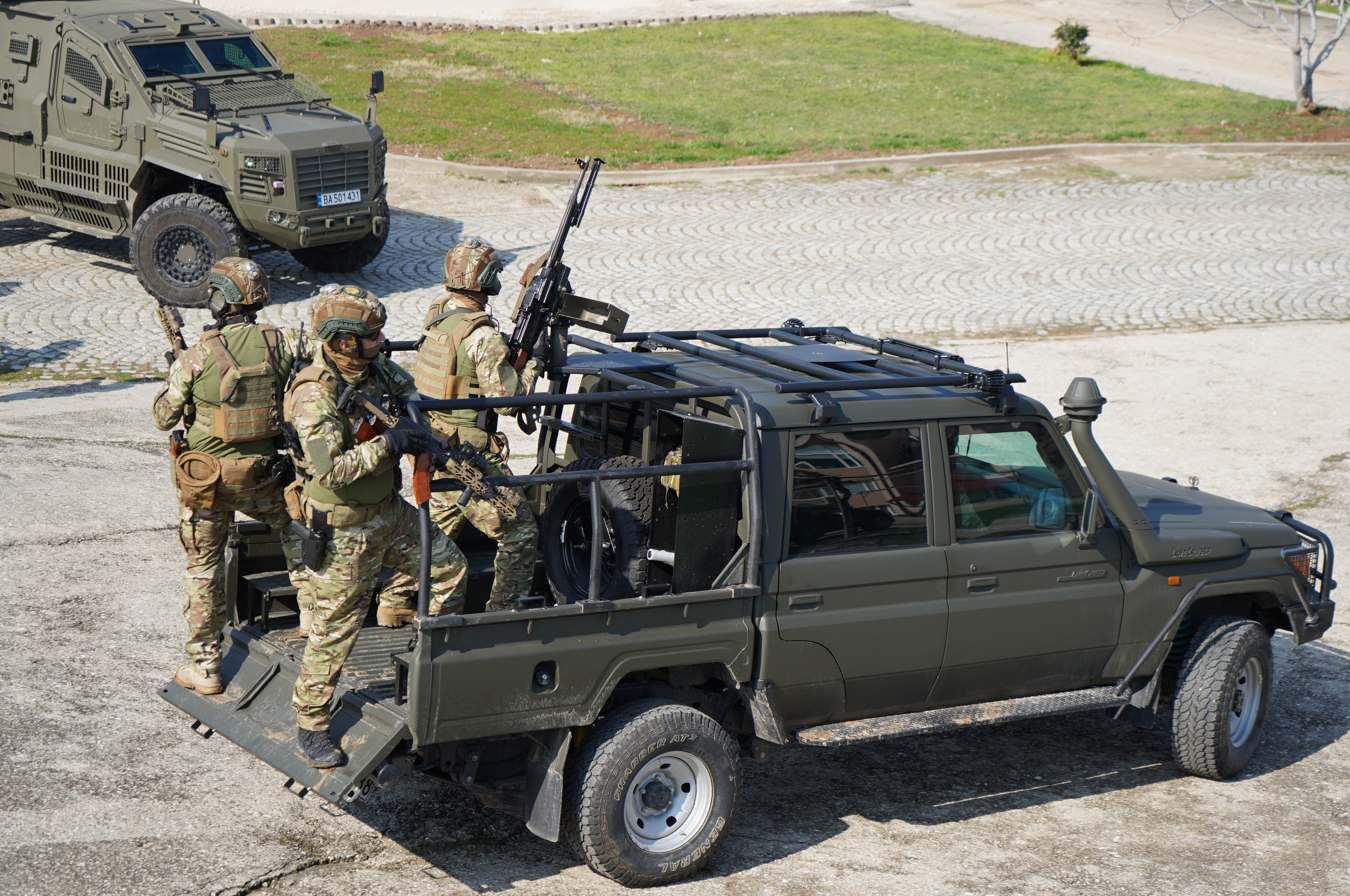
  JSOCOM operators on a Toyota Land Cruiser 79

The Brigade's missions include:

- Special (covert/clandestine) Reconnaissance (специално разузнаване)
- Irregular Warfare and Counter-Insurgency (водене на партизанска и антипартизанска война)
- Direct actions (Директни Акции)
- Counter-Terrorism (контратероризъм)
- Military Assistance (mentoring of paramilitary forces) (военно подпомагане)
- Combat Search and Rescue (CSAR) (бойно търсене и спасяване)

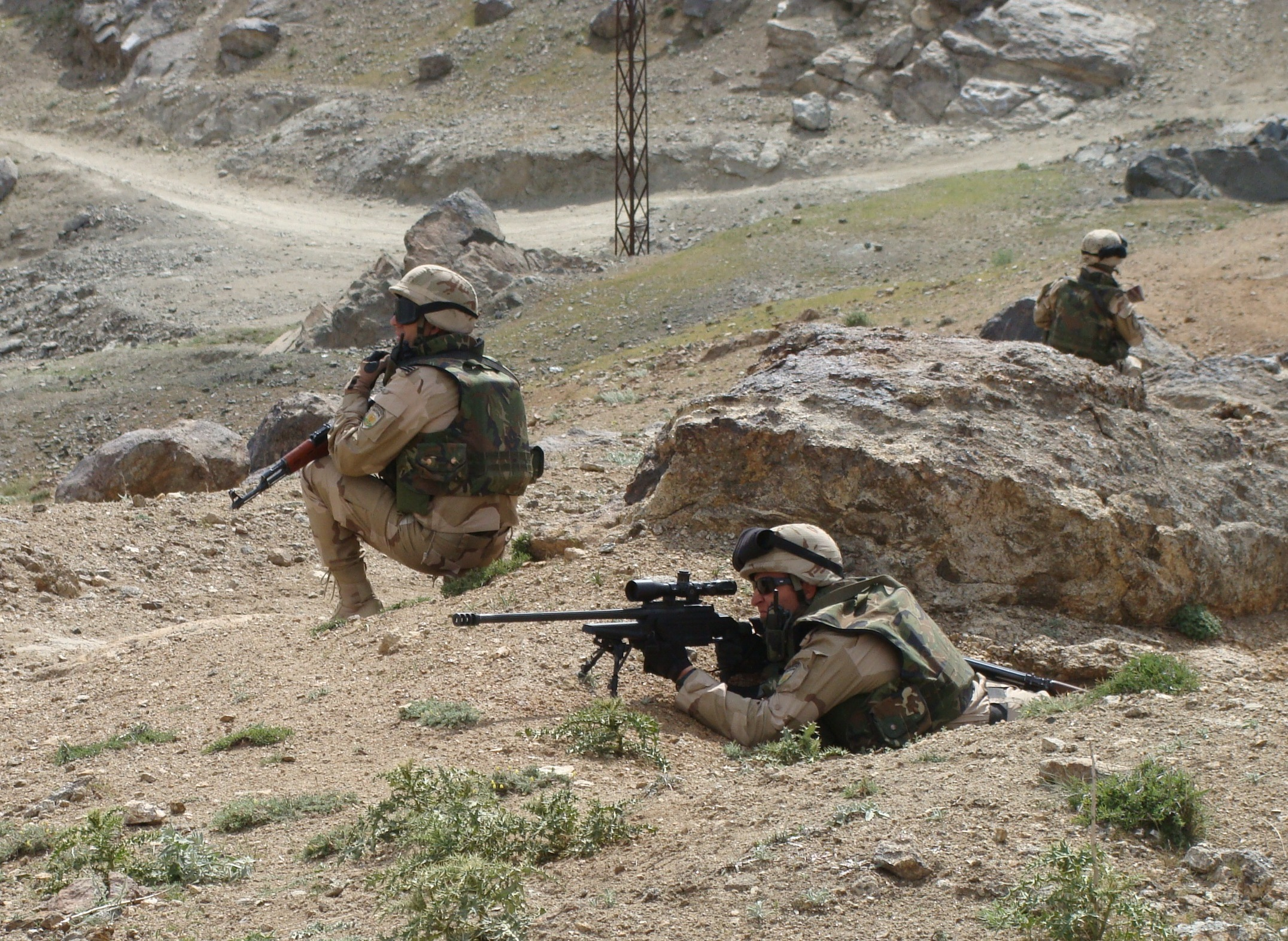
Bulgarian SF in deployment.

== International co-operation ==
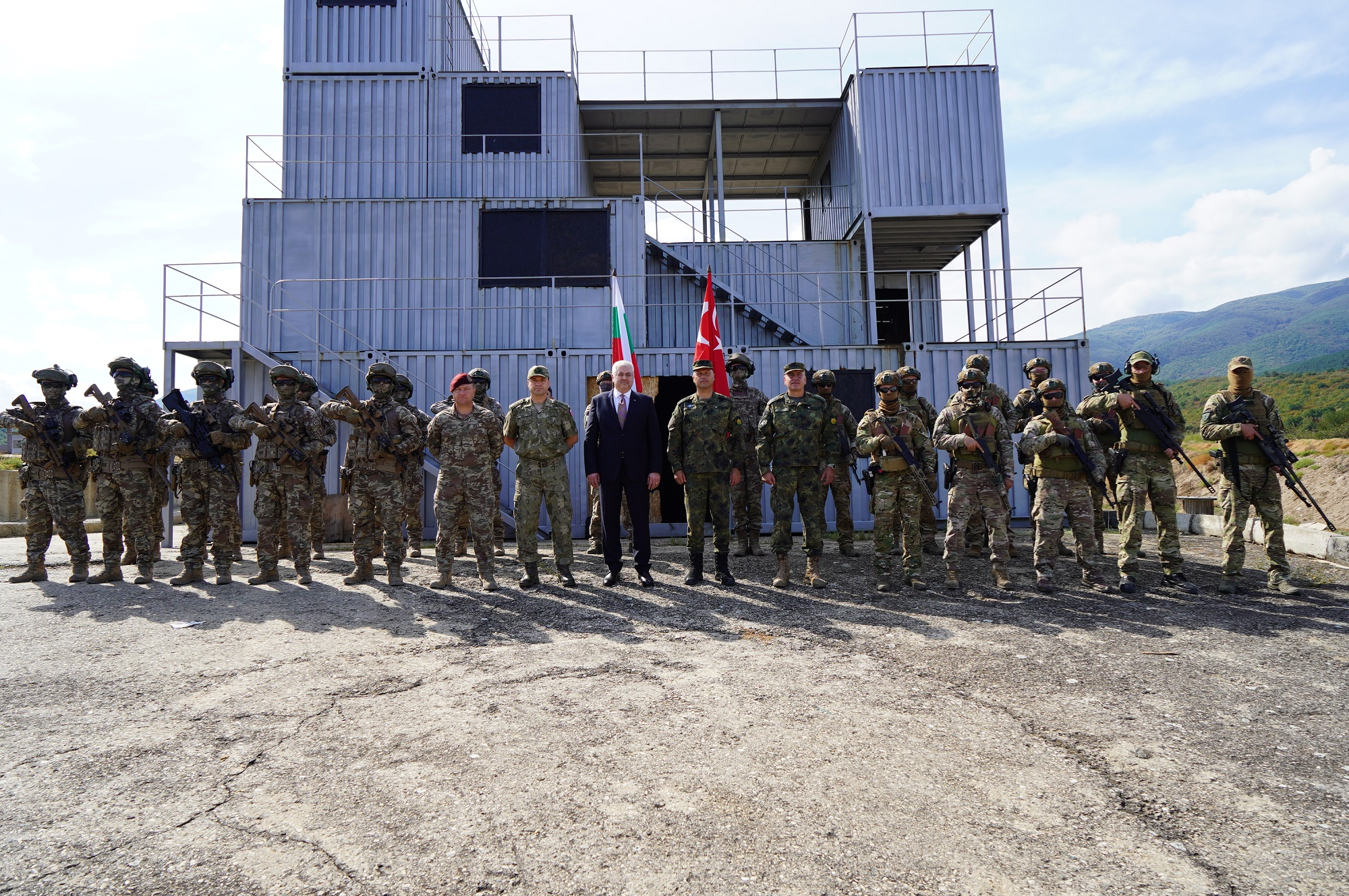
Bulgarian and Turkish operators after an joint exercise

The Bulgarian Special Forces personnel regularly attends training courses abroad and military exercises organised by the NATO partners. In addition there is a partnership between Bulgaria, Croatia, Hungary and Slovenia, signed in 2015 and ratified by the states in 2016 for the joint development of special forces elements. The US military is a partner, providing technical and training support for the project. The plans call for a dedicated training facility near Zadar, probably the abandoned former air base near Udbina. The agreement was deepened with another memorandum between the four countries, signed in November 2018 and ratified in the beginning of 2019, for the joint development of special operations aviation assets at the training center of the Croatian Air Force and Air Defence at the Zadar Air Base.

== Independent arm ==
On 1 February 2017 the brigade has been taken out of the structure of the Land Forces and reassigned as an independent formation under the authority of the Chief of Defense. This gives the brigade a unique status. While practically transforming it into a fourth armed service parallel to the Land, Air and Naval Forces, unlike them it is not assigned to the Joint Forces Command. Upon the brigade's reassignment its 101st Mountain Battalion has been detached from it and retained into the Land Forces. According to the recent plans it is to become the Land Forces commando unit with an upgrade in status to a regiment (actually a reinforced battalion battlegroup) and reinforcement in numbers scheduled for 2018.

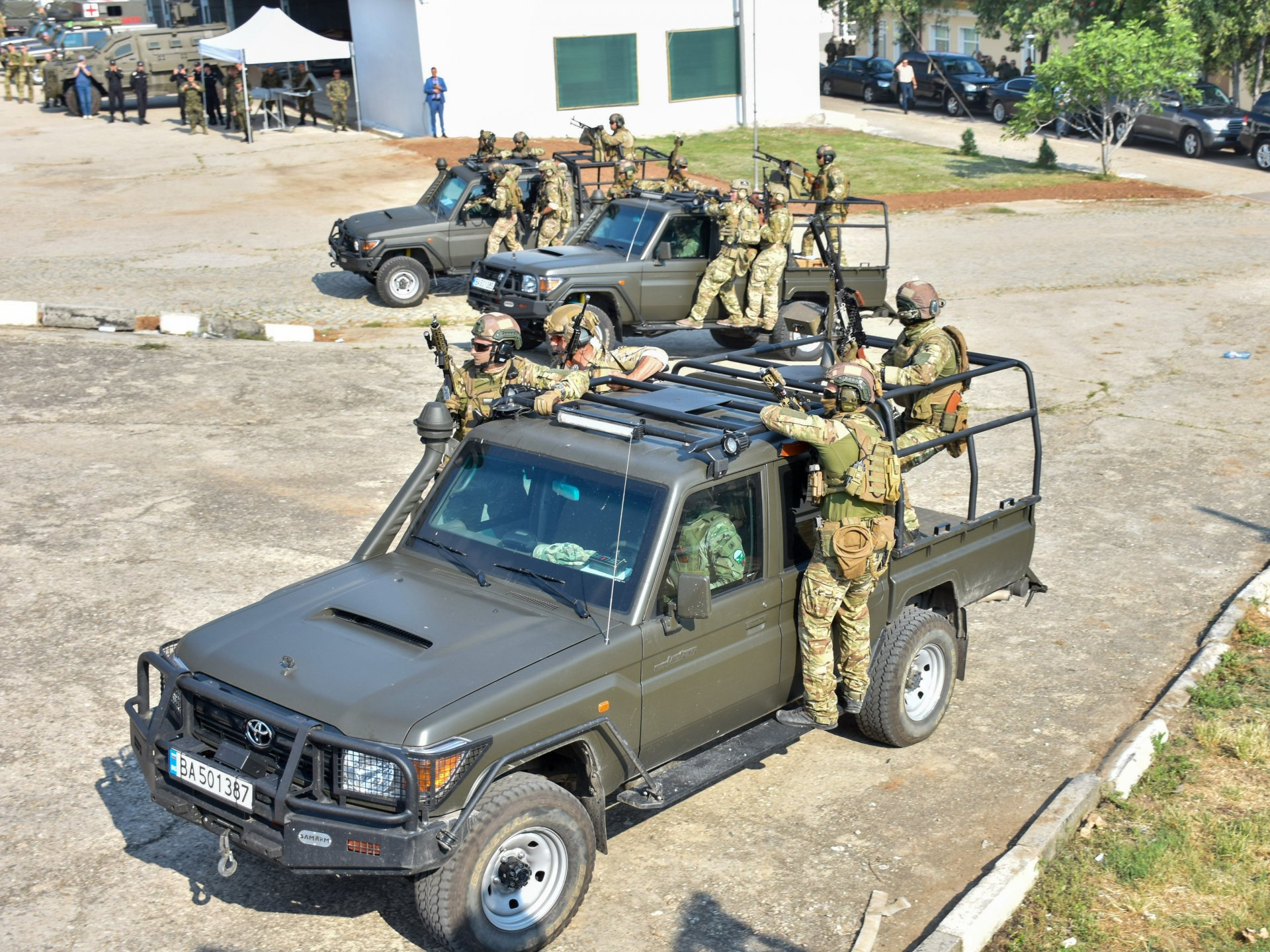
Operators riding on top of the new IAG Land Cruiser 79s during the joint exercise Stealth Dagger-23 along with the 10th Special Forces Group of the United States Army Special Forces

In the beginning of 2019 the Bulgarian government made a decision for the transformation of the 68th Special Forces Brigade into a Joint Special Operations Command (JSOC) (Съвместно командване на специалните операции (СКСО)). The decision was motivated by the Minister of Defense Karakachanov with commitments taken before NATO for the development of the country's special forces. With its implementation their force architecture and command and control structure will be brought in line with that of the organization's other member states and will allow full autonomy of the new command to operate without the support of the Bulgarian Joint Forces Command.

The command's main units are the 3rd,86th and 68th Special forces Groups (formerly battalions) based in Plovdiv, with the 1st Special Operations Group being formed in the capital Sofia. The JSOC is in the process of acquiring 100 Rila MRAPs manufactured locally, with 45 units delivered as of 2021.Rila Xtreme MRAP is a family of 4X4 and 6X6 specialized armored vehicles developed by the Canadian armed vehicles manufacturer International Armored Group founded in Richmond Hill, Ontario by the Bulgarian engineer Dr. Anton Stefov. The manufacturing of the vehicles takes place in Samokov by SamArm - an equal shares joint venture between International Armored Group and Samel 90, a Bulgarian military supplier specialized in communication systems. The model is named Rila after Bulgaria's highest mountain range. The model family also includes an 8X8 armored personnel carrier, which suggest a possible interest by the Bulgarian Army.

There is a modernization plan in the works for replacing the soviet style weaponry with NATO Standard weaponry.

== Equipment ==
=== Small arms ===
| Model | Origin | Type |
|---|---|---|
| Sig Sauer SP2022 | United States | Pistol |
| Heckler & Koch MP5 | Germany | Submachine gun |
| Benelli M3A1 | Italy | Shotgun |
| Benelli M4 Super 90 | Italy | Shotgun |
| AR-M1 | Bulgaria | Assault rifle |
| AR-SF | Bulgaria | Assault rifle |
| Sako TRG M10 | Finland | Sniper rifle |
| Heckler & Koch HK417 | Germany | Sniper rifle |
| Barrett M82 | United States | Sniper rifle |
| M240 | United States | General-purpose machine gun |
| Arsenal LMG MG-1M | Bulgaria | Machine gun |
| RPK | Bulgaria | Machine gun |
| RPG-7 | Bulgaria | Rocket-propelled grenade |
| RPG-22 | Bulgaria | Rocket-propelled grenade |
| GP-25 | Bulgaria | Grenade launcher |

=== Vehicles ===
- Mercedes-Benz G-Class
- Toyota Land Cruiser 79
- HMMWV
- Rila 4x4 Xtreme MRAPs

== Gallery ==
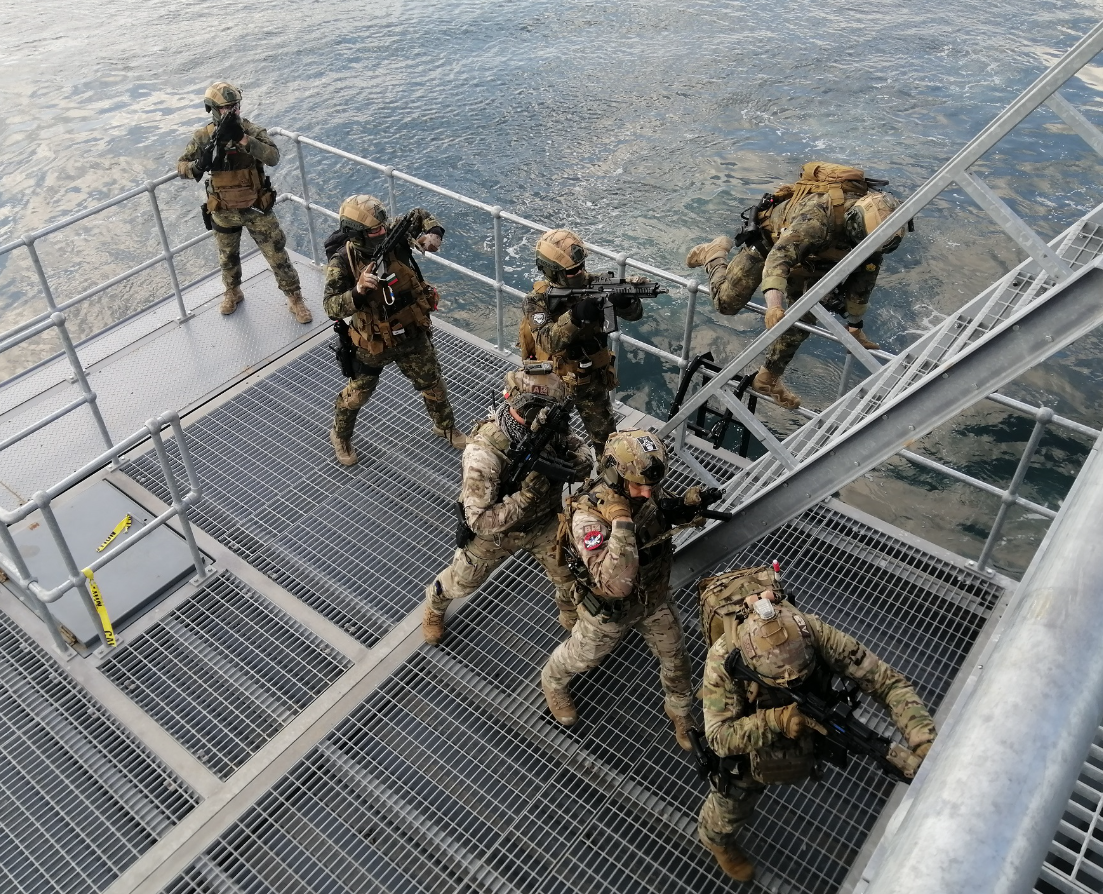
Bulgarian and Romanian Naval special forces during exercise ''Valiant Strike 2025''

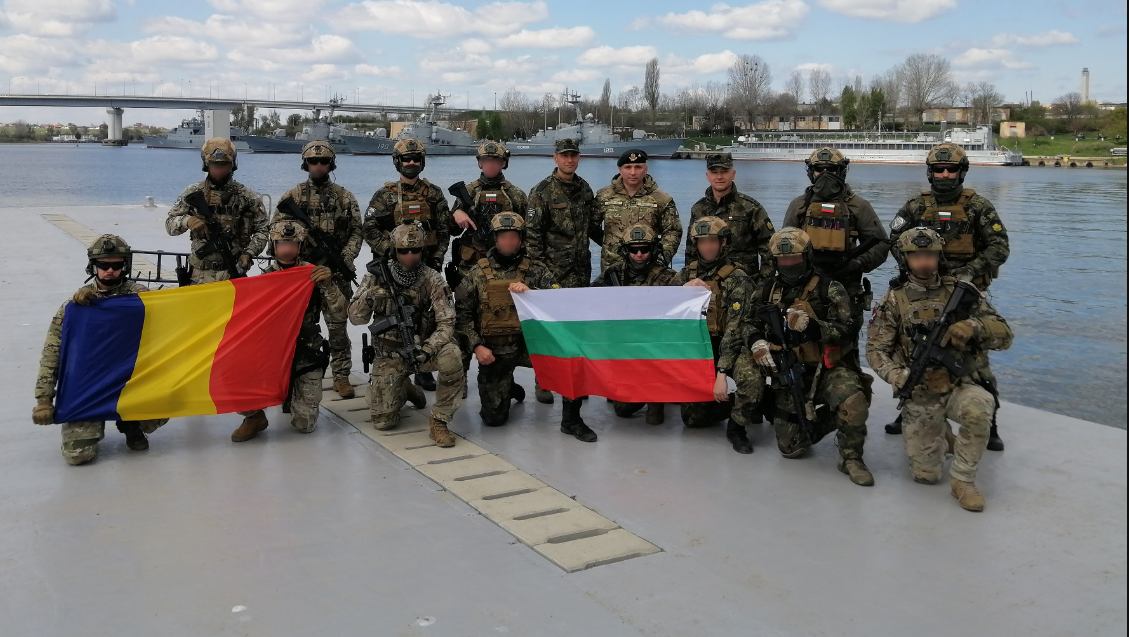
Bulgarian and Romanian Naval special forces after exercise ''Valiant Strike 2025''

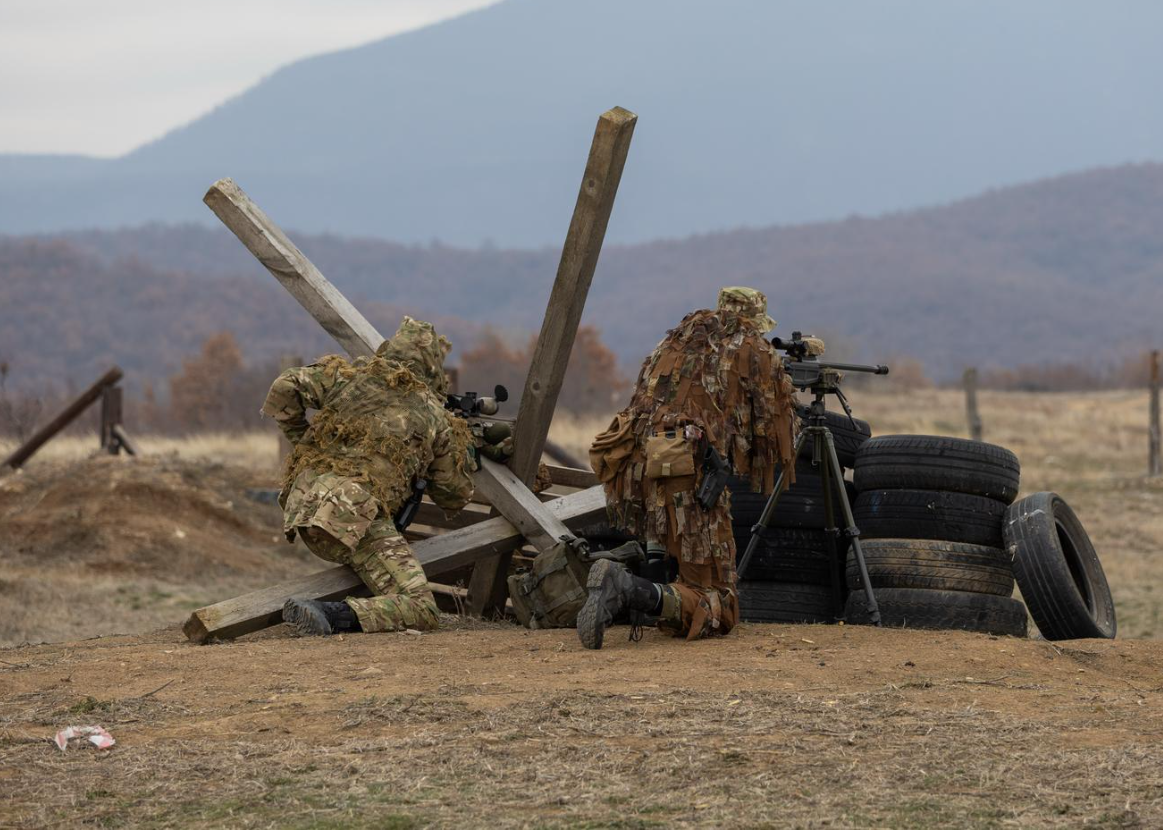
Bulgarian Special Forces snipers during exercise "SteadfastDart25"

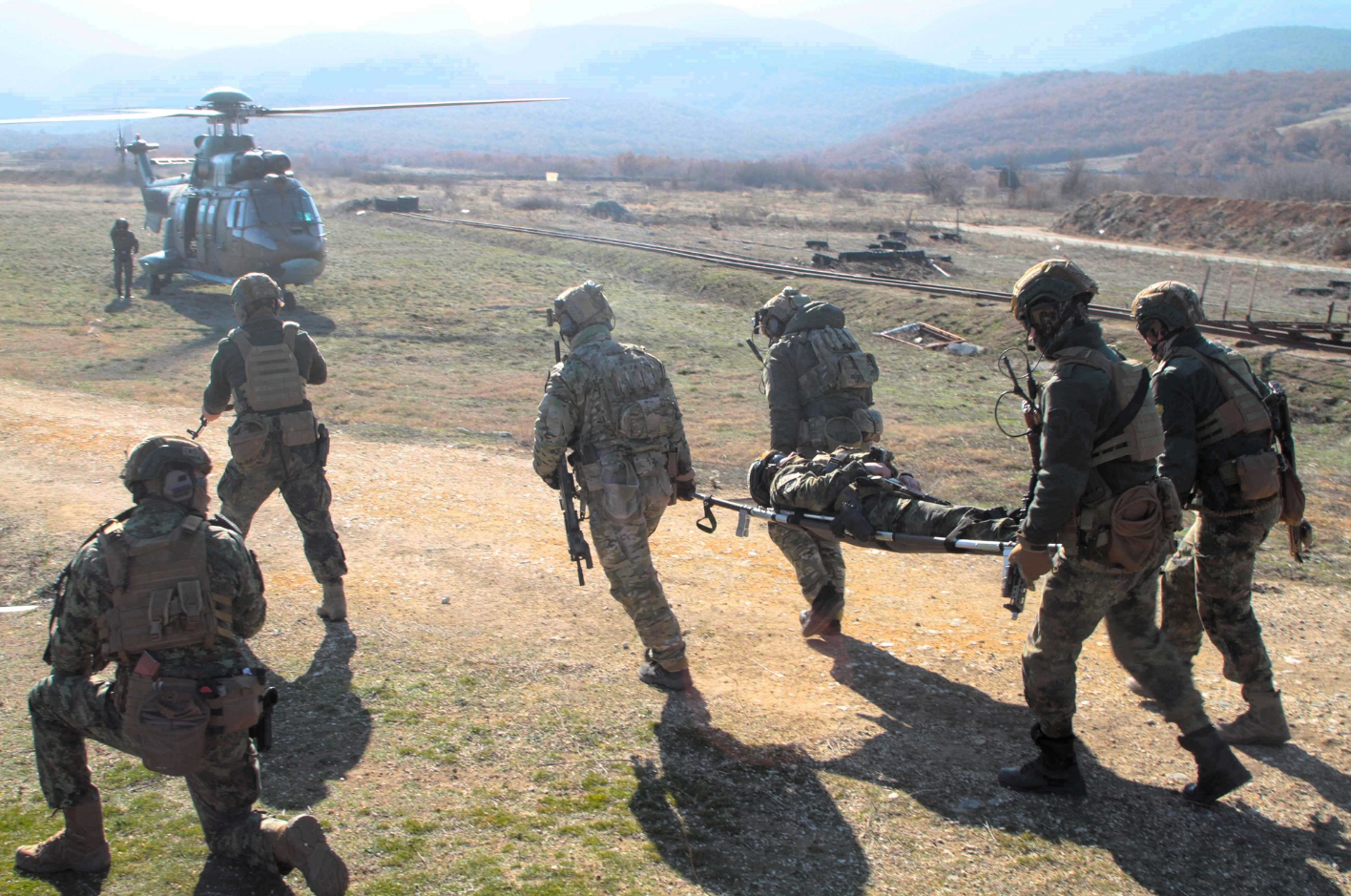
Bulgarian and Spanish Special Forces on MEDEVAC training during exercise "SteadfastDart25"

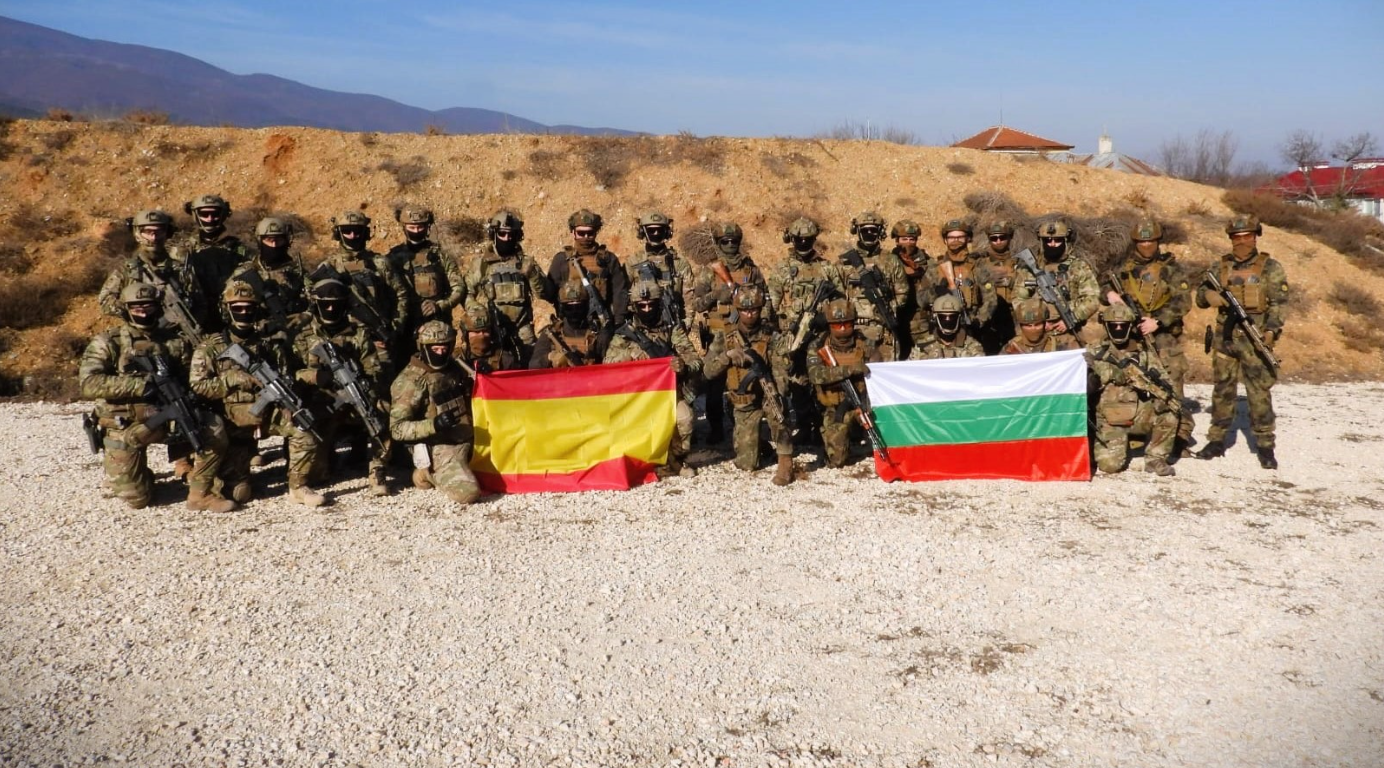
Bulgarian and Spanish Special Forces after exercise "SteadfastDart25"

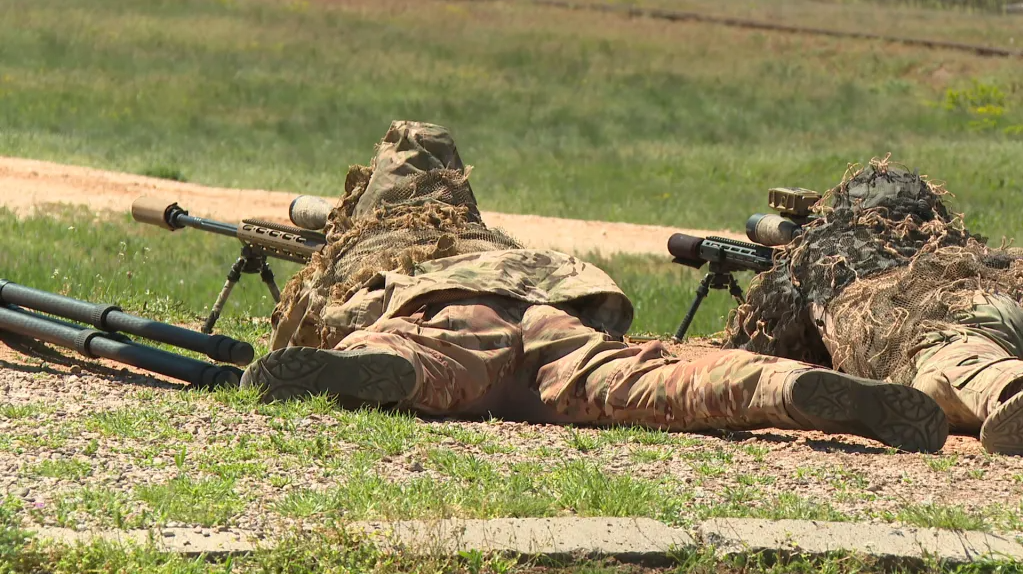
Bulgarian Special Forces snipers on an exercise.

== Literature ==
- Grigorov, Plamen (2002). The Bulgarian Special Forces (Българските Спецсили). Sofia, Bulgaria: Rasper Publishing. ISBN 954-90774-7-0.
