= Haragach Thana =

- Police Station
- Haragach Thana
- Location in Bangladesh Haragach Thana (Rangpur division)
- Coordinates: 25.802673°N 89.3163514°E
- Country: Bangladesh
- Division: Rangpur Division
- District: Rangpur District
- Established: 28 June 2012

Area
  - Total: 27.30 km^{2} (10.54 sq mi)

Population (2022)
  - Total: 62,709
  - Density: 2,297/km^{2} (5,949/sq mi)
- Time zone: UTC+6 (BST)
- Postal code: 5441
- Area code: 0521
- Website: bangladesh.gov.bd/maps/images/rangpur/haragach.gif

Haragach Thana is a metropolitan police station of Rangpur Metropolitan Police. The police station was established on 28 June 2012.

== Demographics ==
Religions in Haragachh Thana (2022)
Religion	Percent
Islam	94.46%
Hinduism	5.53%
Other or not stated	0.01%

According to the 2022 Bangladeshi census, Haragachh Thana had 14,897 households and a population of 62,709. 10.11% of the population were under 5 years of age. Haragachh had a literacy rate (age 7 and over) of 71.26%: 73.87% for males and 68.60% for females, and a sex ratio of 102.39 males for every 100 females.

== Administration ==
Rangpur City Corporation ward 7, 8, 9 and Haragach Municipality and Sarai Union from Kaunia Upazila fall under the thana.
