= Tajhat Thana =

- Police Station
- Tajhat Thana
- Location in Rangpur Location in Rangpur division
- Coordinates: 25.7195551°N 89.243645°E
- Country: Bangladesh
- Division: Rangpur Division
- District: Rangpur District
- Established: 28 June 2012

Area
  - Total: 27.04 km^{2} (10.44 sq mi)

Population (2022)
  - Total: 93,687
  - Density: 3,465/km^{2} (8,974/sq mi)
- Time zone: UTC+6 (BST)
- Postal code: 5400
- Area code: 0521
- Website: bangladesh.gov.bd/maps/images/rangpur/tajhat.gif

Tajhat Thana is a metropolitan police station of Rangpur Metropolitan Police, The police station was established on 28 June 2012.

== Demographics ==
Religions in Tajhat Thana (2022)
Religion	Percent
Islam	92.51%
Hinduism	7.14%
Other or not stated	0.35%

According to the 2022 Bangladeshi census, Tajhat Thana had 21,235 households and a population of 93,687. 7.66% of the population were under 5 years of age. Tajhat had a literacy rate (age 7 and over) of 78.76%: 81.67% for males and 75.49% for females, and a sex ratio of 112.02 males for every 100 females.

== Administration ==
The Rangpur City Corporation ward of 15, 28, 29, 31 and 32 and Payraband and Ranipukur fall under this police station.
