= Mahiganj Thana =

Thana in Rangpur Division, Bangladesh

- Police Station
- Mahiganj Thana
- Location in Bangladesh Mahiganj Thana (Rangpur division)
- Coordinates: 25.7293252°N 89.2900865°E
- Country: Bangladesh
- Division: Rangpur Division
- District: Rangpur District
- Established: 28 June 2012

Area
  - Total: 23.15 km^{2} (8.94 sq mi)

Population (2022)
  - Total: 56,731
  - Density: 2,451/km^{2} (6,347/sq mi)
- Time zone: UTC+6 (BST)
- Postal code: 5403
- Area code: 0521

Mahiganj Thana is a metropolitan thana of Rangpur Metropolitan Police. The police station was established on 28 June 2012.

== Demographics ==
Religions in Mahiganj Thana (2022)
Religion	Percent
Islam	92.33%
Hinduism	7.67%

According to the 2022 Bangladeshi census, Mahiganj Thana had 14,240 households and a population of 56,731. 8.89% of the population were under 5 years of age. Mahiganj had a literacy rate (age 7 and over) of 75.37%: 77.73% for males and 73.06% for females, and a sex ratio of 98.27 males for every 100 females.

== Administration ==
Rangpur City Corporation ward no 29, 30, 33 and a union from Pirganj Upazila fall under the jurisdiction of Mahiganj Thana.
