= Khandaker Diliruzzaman =

Bangladeshi judge

Justice of the High Court Division of Bangladesh

Personal details
- Born: March 23, 1973 (age 53)
- Profession: Judge

Khandaker Diliruzzaman is a judge of the High Court Division of the Bangladesh Supreme Court.

== Early life ==
Diliruzzaman was born on 23 March 1973. He has a bachelor's and master's in law from the University of Rajshahi.

== Career ==
Diliruzzaman became an advocate of the District Courts on 12 December 1999. He became a lawyer of the High Court Division on 9 February 2001.

Diliruzzaman was appointed an additional judge of the High Court Division on 31 March 2018. On 4 September, Diliruzzaman and Justice Md Ruhul Quddus deferred the bail hearing of photographer Shahidul Alam in a case filed under the Information and Communication Technology Act, 2006. Both the judges later expressed "embarrassment" at hearing the case and sent it to the chief justice to forward the case to another bench. This surprised the lawyers of Shahidul Alam, Shahdeen Malik and Sara Hossain, since the proceeding had started.

In October 2019, Diliruzzaman and Justice Moyeenul Islam Chowdhury asked the government not to harass Nobel Prize winner Muhammad Yunus.

On 30 May 2020, Diliruzzaman was made a permanent judge of the High Court Division by President Mohammad Abdul Hamid.

On 29 April 2021, Justice Mamnoon Rahman and Justice Khandaker Diliruzzaman refused to hear an anticipatory bail petition of Sayem Sobhan Anvir, managing director of Bashundhara Group. In August, Justice Mamnoon Rahman and Diliruzzaman issued a sua sponte contempt ruling against SM Tanvir Arafat, superintendent of Kushtia District police, for misbehaving with a judicial magistrate during election duty. On 14 December 2021, Justice Mamnoon Rahman and Diliruzzaman removed copyright protection for images of the Bangladesh Liberation War and President Sheikh Mujibur Rahman. Justice Mamnoon Rahman and Diliruzzaman issued an order asking Zahangir Alam, mayor of Gazipur, why contempt of court proceedings should not begin against him for not obeying a 2018 court order that asked him not to disturb the property of the petitioner, Ashraf Uddin Ahmed. Justice Mamnoon Rahman and Diliruzzaman issued an order asking Rangpur Metropolitan Police to explain the custodial death of man in November 2021.

Justice Mamnoon Rahman and Diliruzzaman issued a ruling on 7 February 2022 that stayed a lower court verdict cancelling the candidacy of Zayed Khan in the election for the Bangladesh Film Artistes' Association. In November 2022, Diliruzzaman and Justice Bhishmadev Chakrabortty upheld the death penalty of three in the "sensational" Himadri Majumder Himu murder case from 2012.

In July 2024, Diliruzzaman was appointed to a commission of inquiry into the deaths of protesters participating in the 2024 Bangladesh quota reform movement.
