= Parshuram Thana (Rangpur) =

Thana in Rangpur Division, Bangladesh

- Thana
- Location in Bangladesh Parshuram Thana (Rangpur division)
- Coordinates: 25.784687°N 89.2298577°E
- Country: Bangladesh
- Division: Rangpur Division
- District: Rangpur District
- Established: 28 June 2012

Area
  - Total: 29.88 km^{2} (11.54 sq mi)

Population (2022)
  - Total: 70,087
  - Density: 2,346/km^{2} (6,075/sq mi)
- Time zone: UTC+6 (BST)
- Postal code: 5400
- Area code: 0521

Parshuram Thana is a metropolitan thana of Rangpur Metropolitan Police. The police station was established on 28 June 2012.

== Demographics ==
Religions in Parshuram Thana (2022)
Religion	Percent
Islam	88.37%
Hinduism	11.61%
Other or not stated	0.02%

According to the 2022 Bangladeshi census, Parshuram Thana had 17,139 households and a population of 70,087. 8.93% of the population were under 5 years of age. Parshuram had a literacy rate (age 7 and over) of 76.68%: 78.75% for males and 74.64% for females, and a sex ratio of 98.87 males for every 100 females.

== Administration ==
Rangpur City Corporation ward 3, 4, 5 and 6 fall under this Police station.
