= Mamnoon Rahman =

Bangladeshi judge

The Honourable Mamnoon Rahman
- মামনুন রহমান

Justice of the High Court Division of Bangladesh
- In office 23 August 2004 – 2 February 2026

Personal details
- Born: 9 December 1965 (age 60) Comilla
- Spouse: Kohinoor Rahman
- Education: University of Dhaka
- Profession: Judge

Mamnoon Rahman (born 9 December 1965) was a Bangladeshi justice of the High Court Division of Bangladesh Supreme Court. He was appointed in 2004.

== Early life and education ==
Rahman was born in Cumilla district on 9 December 1965. His father late Rezaur Rahman was a prominent lawyer of Cumilla Bar Association and was principal of The Cumilla Law College. His mother's name is late Afsari Rahman. Rahman obtained LL.B honours and LL.M degree from the University of Dhaka.

== Career ==
Rahman became a lawyer of the Districts Court on 26 November 1989.

On 29 May 1990, Rahman became a lawyer of the High Court Division of Bangladesh Supreme Court.

Rahman became a lawyer of the Appellate Division of the Bangladesh Supreme Court on 25 October 2001.

On 23 August 2004, Rahman was appointed an additional judge of the High Court Division of Bangladesh Supreme Court.

Rahman was made a permanent judge of the High Court Division on 23 August 2006.

On 6 March 2008, Rahman and Justice Mirza Hussain Haider declared the detention of Khandaker Mosharraf Hossain, Bangladesh Nationalist Party politician, by the police using the Special Powers Act to be illegal.

Rahman is Judge in the High Court of Bangladesh. In 2007, during the 2006 to 2008 Bangladeshi political crisis, the Bangladesh High Court has ordered a ban on holding all elections, including the national elections of the country. The order was passed by a division bench comprising Justice Syed M Dastagir Husain and Justice Mamnoon Rahman.

On 3 August 2010, Rahman and Justice Syeda Afsar Jahan felt embarrassed to hear petitions by Rafiqul Islam Miah and Shah Moazzem Hossain, Bangladesh Nationalist Party politicians, challenging their summons issued by Paltan police station. In September 2010, Rahman and Justice Syeda Afsar Jahan ordered the Government of Bangladesh to allow Reaz Rahman to travel outside of Bangladesh.

On 29 April 2021, Rahman and Justice Khandaker Diliruzzaman refused to hear an anticipatory bail petition of Sayem Sobhan Anvir, managing director of Bashundhara Group. In August, Rahman and Justice Khandaker Diliruzzaman issued a sua sponte contempt ruling against SM Tanvir Arafat, Superintendent of Kushtia District police, for misbehaving with a judicial magistrate during election duty. On 14 December 2021, Rahman and Justice Khandaker Diliruzzaman removed copyright protection for images of Bangladesh Liberation war and President Sheikh Mujibur Rahman.

Rahman and Justice Khandaker Diliruzzaman issued a ruling on 7 February 2022 that stayed a lower court verdict cancelling the candidacy of Zayed Khan in the election for Bangladesh Film Artistes' Association. He has resigned on 2 February 2026 while in Canada, citing “personal reasons.” He had been on leave since March 3, 2025, due to personal reasons and illness.
