= Samel 90 =

Samel 90 is a Bulgarian manufacturer of electronics, situated in Samokov, Bulgaria.

It was established in 1964 aiming at satisfying the needs of the Bulgarian military. After 1990 the traditional range of special purpose products has been enriched with consumer electronics in the fields of telecommunications, specialized electronics for lighting industry, automotive spare parts, etc. Nevertheless, Samel 90 continues to develop and expand its range of special purpose products and remains one of the main suppliers and integrators of telecommunication and other electronic equipment for the Ministry of Defence and the Ministry of Interior of the Republic of Bulgaria. The products of Samel 90 are well accepted in the UK, Germany, Belgium, France, USA, China, as well as many countries from the Middle East and Africa. This makes Samel 90 a competitive, export-oriented company, as the export share reaches as far as 70% of the annual sales.

== History ==
1964 - A branch of the “Signal” Factory - Sofia is established in the town of Samokov as a plant of closed technological cycle for the production of military radio-electronics for the needs of the Bulgarian Army, the Ministry of Interior and the member states of Warsaw Pact. The plant is situated at 60 km to the south of the Capital of Bulgaria and there is a possibility of easy access to different kinds of transport means.

1982 – The plant is named “Hristo Nikov” and already incorporates various types of productions and facilities. It is part of the “Electron” holding company.

1990–1991 – The plant is renamed to “Samel 90” after “Samokov Electronics 1990” and becomes an independent company.

1999 – Samel 90 is transformed into a share holding company of 100% private capital.
