= IAG Guardian =

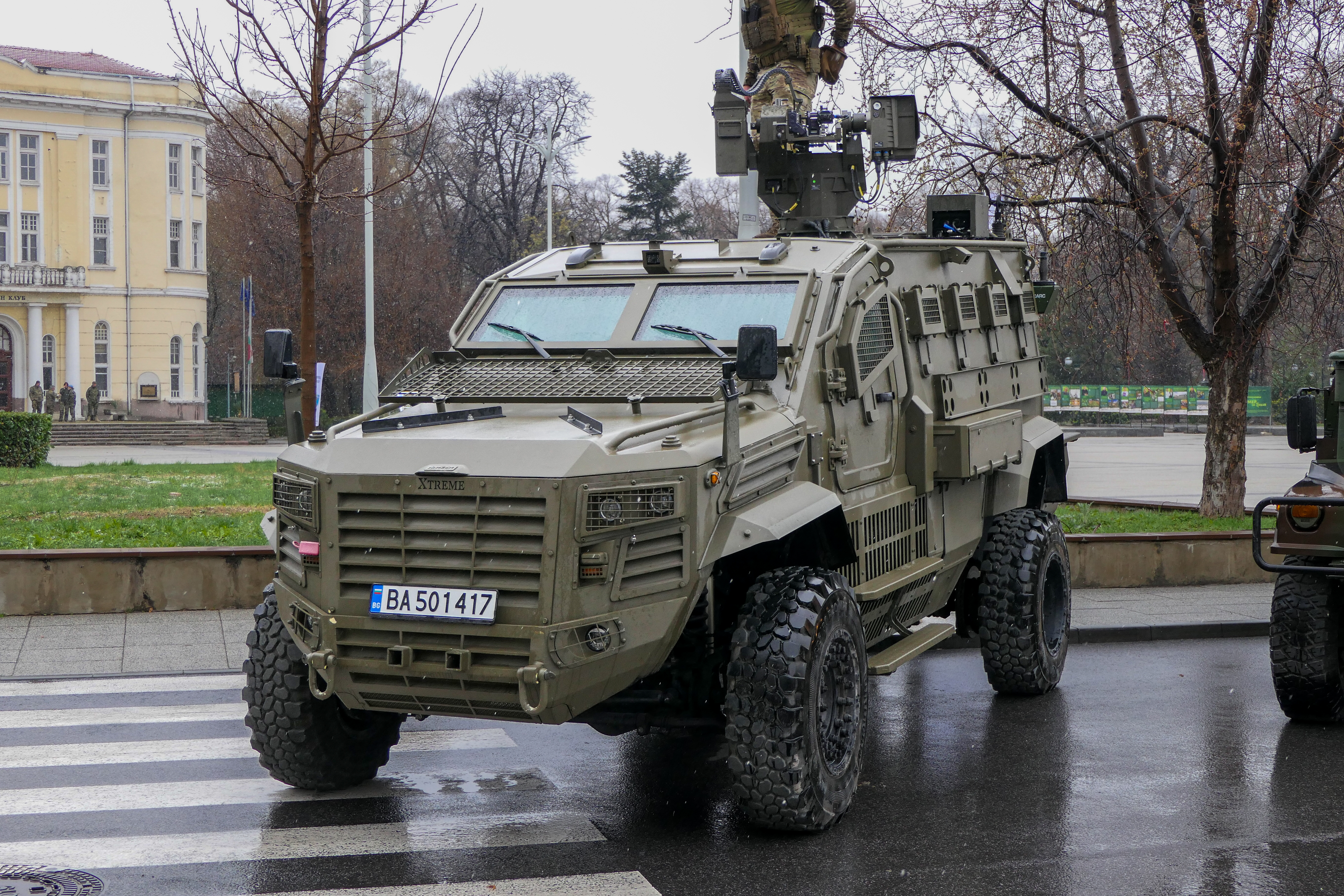
- IAG Guardian Xtreme of Bulgarian Armed Forces
- Type: Infantry mobility vehicle
- Place of origin: United Arab Emirates

Service history
- Wars: Iraqi civil war Syrian civil war Islamist insurgency in Niger; Haitian conflict

Production history
- Manufacturer: International Armored Group (IAG)

Specifications
- Mass: 8-12 tonnes
- Length: 5.95 meters
- Width: 2.43 meters
- Height: 2.56 meters
- Crew: 2 + 10 passenger
- Armor: STANAG level II (basic); STANAG level III (with add on armor)
- Main armament: M2HB Browning 12.7mm
- Engine: 6.7L V8 Diesel (300hp/790lb-ft); 6.2L V8 Petrol (385hp/430lb-ft); 6.8L V10 Petrol (288hp/424lb-ft)
- Suspension: 4x4 6x6
- Maximum speed: 120 km/h

The IAG Guardian is an Emirati-made Infantry mobility vehicle. It was developed by the International Armored Group company. It is available in 4x4 and 6x6 configurations. IAG Guardian is manufactured in IAG manufacturing facility in Ras Al Khaimah.

== Design ==
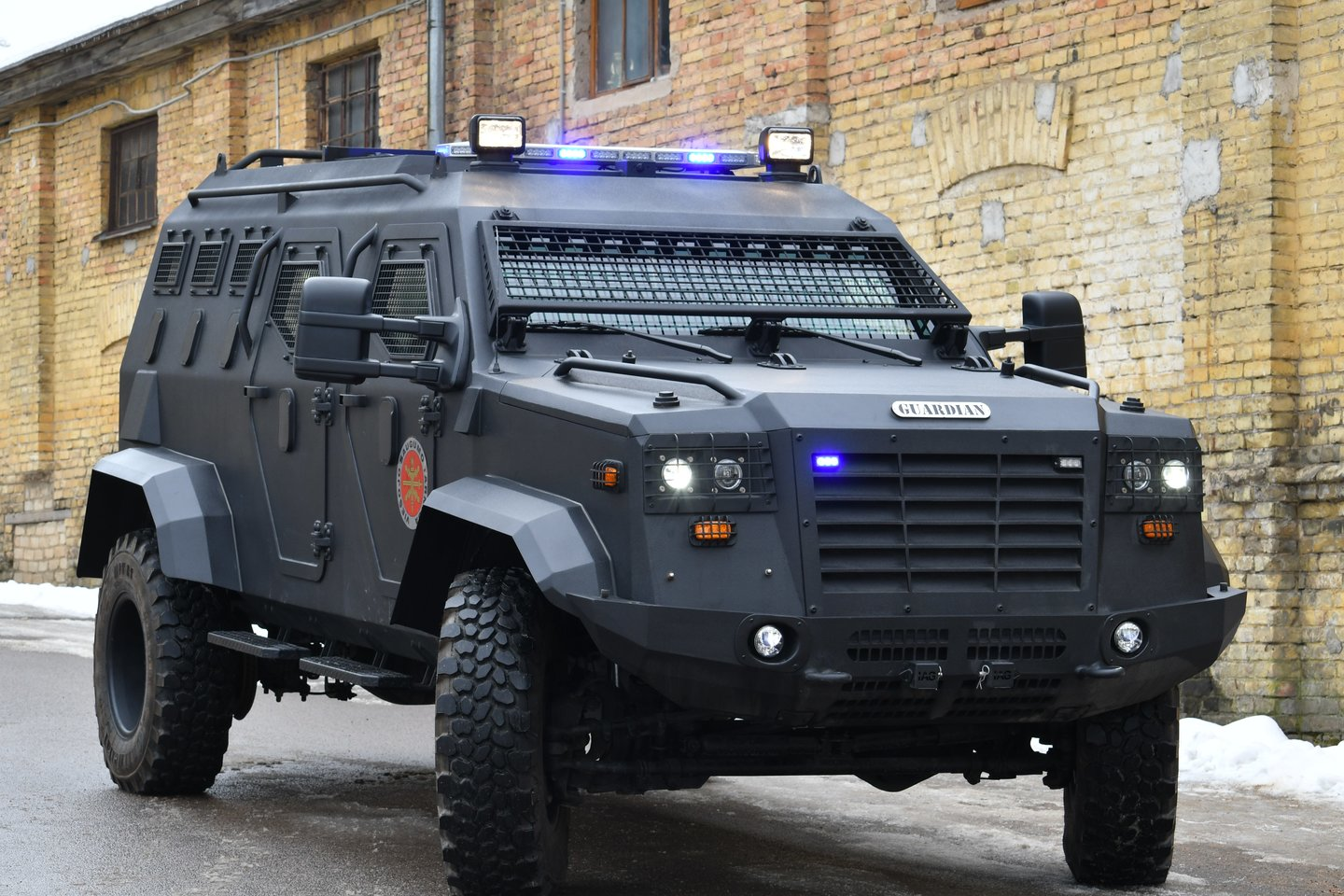
IAG Guardian of Lithuanian Public Safety.

Guardians are able to withstand projectiles fired from high level ballistic and blast resistance. Equipped with diesel V8 turbo 6.7 L engine that produces 300 HP or engine type 6.8L V10, this machine produces 352 HP power with 5 or 6 speed automatic transmission. Guardian can speed up to 120 km per hour on smooth with the range up to 800 km.

For the protection aspect, the Guardian is designed with standard ballistic protection up to CEN Level B6 or STANAG level II. But with an add-on armor package, Guardian protection can be upgraded to CEN Level B7 or STANAG level III. Additional protection can be removed to reduce the weight of the vehicle, such as to facilitate maneuvering the vehicle while crossing off-road terrain. In principle, the Guardian provides 360 degree protection to its crew, including the implementation of 3 point door locking to provide extra protection in the face of explosive effects.

The Guardian is also able to withstand a 6 kg TNT effect that explodes under the vehicle.

== Variants ==
Guardian 4x4
Basic variant for low intensity conflict in two axle configuration. Can carry a total of 10 personnel, including driver/commander.

Guardian 4x4 Xtreme
An upgraded variant with add-on armor and cage armor to increase the protection level. The level of protection increased to STANAG Level III.

Guardian 6x6
New configuration with better protection in three axle configuration. Can carry a total of 12 personnel, including driver/commander.

== Combat history ==
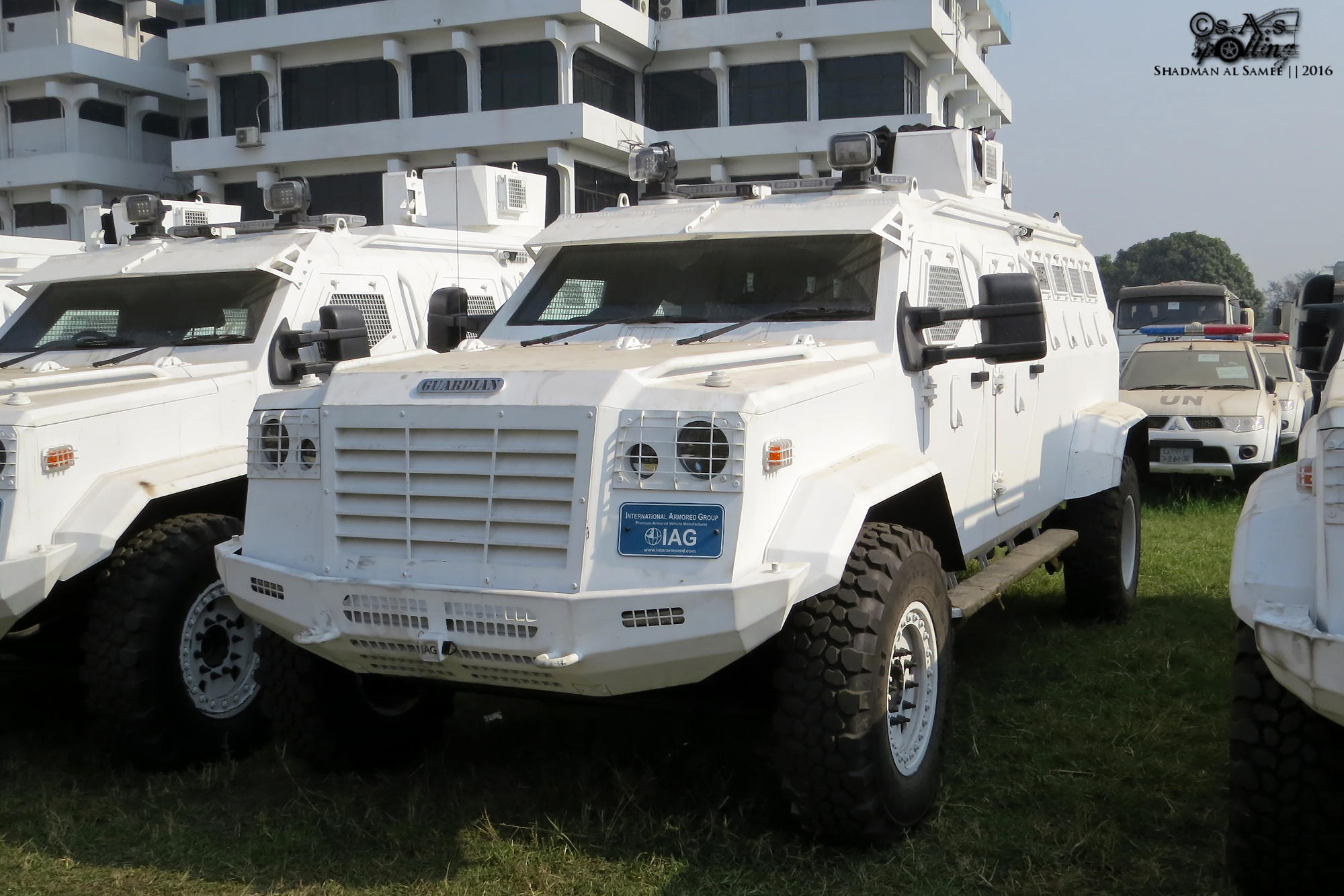
IAG Guardian of Bangladesh Police.

The IAG Guardian was used by Kurdish Military Forces in Iraq and the Syrian Democratic Forces in Syria, it showed combat capabilities by protecting soldiers in operations.

The IAG Guardian is also operated by the Malaysian Armed Forces for its peacekeeping mission in Lebanon under the United Nations (UN) flag.

== Operators ==
- Bangladesh: In police service.
- Bulgaria: An initial batch of 4 Guardian Xtreme MRAPs was delivered in December 2021 for the Bulgarian Special Forces. Likely more were delivered in 2022. They were built locally at the SAMARM 90 factory.
- Chile: In Chilean Gendarmerie.
- Haiti : delivered to Haitian security forces on September 27 2026
  - Armed Forces of Haiti
  - Haitian National Police
- Kosovo: In use by Kosovo Police 20 vehicles.
- Lithuania: In Public Security Service.
- Malaysia: 12 Guardian 4x4 Xtreme in service with Malaysian Army United Nations Interim Force in Lebanon, 4 in service with General Operations Force, Royal Malaysia Police.
- Niger: The Nigerien Army received IAG Guardian courtesy of German assistance.
- Vietnam: Several IAG Guardian Tactical 4x4s, bought in 2016, still in police service.

=== Non-state actors ===
- Syrian Democratic Forces.
- Peshmerga.
