= 2017 Rangpur City Corporation election =

Mayoral election in Bangladesh

- 21 December 2017
- Registered: 393,894
- Turnout: 74.23%
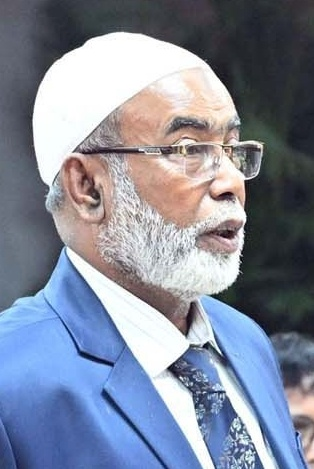
	First party	Second party	Third party
Candidate	Mostafizar Rahman Mostafa	Sharfuddin Ahmed Jhantu	Kawsar Zaman Babla
Party	JP(E)	AL	BNP
Popular vote	159,824	61,557	34,791
Percentage	55.01%	21.19%	11.97%
Swing	New	▼23.53%	New
	Fourth party
Candidate	A. T. M. Golam Mostafa Babu
Party	IAB
Popular vote	23,718
Percentage	8.17%
Swing	New
Mayor before election
Sharfuddin Ahmed Jhantu
Awami League
Elected Mayor
Mostafizar Rahman Mostafa
JP(E)
- Council election
- 21 December 2017; 44 seats in the Rangpur City Corporation
Party	Leader	Seats	+/–
AL	Sharfuddin Ahmed Jhantu	19	
JP(E)	Mostafizar Rahman Mostafa	13	
BNP	Kawsar Zaman Babla	6	
BSD	Didn't contest	1	
Independent	—	5	
This lists parties that won seats. See the complete results below.

The 2017 Rangpur City Corporation election was a local government election in the city of Rangpur, Bangladesh, held on 21 December 2017 to elect the Mayor of Rangpur and the Rangpur City Council. The election resulted in a victory for the Jatiya Party (Ershad) candidate Mostafizar Rahman Mostafa. In the 44-member City Council, the Awami League won 19 seats, while the Jatiya Party (Ershad) won 13 seats, the Bangladesh Nationalist Party won 6 seats, the Socialist Party of Bangladesh won 1 seat, and independents won 5 seats.

== Mayoral election results ==
Rangpur mayoral election 2017
Party	Candidate	Votes	%	±%
JP(E)	Mostafizur Rahman Mostafa	159,824	55.01%	—
AL	Sharfuddin Ahmed Jhantu	61,557	21.19%	—
BNP	Kawsar Zaman Babla	34,791	11.97%	—
IAB	A. T. M. Golam Mostafa Babu	23,718	8.17%	—
Independent	Hossain Maqbul Shahriar Asif	2,306	0.79%	New
BSD	Abdul Quddus	1,245	0.43%	—
NPP	Md. Selim Akhter	807	0.28%	New
Rejected ballots		6,273	2.16%	
Majority		98,267	33.82%	
Turnout		290,521	74.23%	
Registered electors		391,366		
JP(E) hold				

== Council election results ==
=== Party-wise ===
2022 RpCC council election results (party-wise)
Party	Winning seats
Bangladesh Awami League	19
Jatiya Party–JaPa (Ershad)	13
Bangladesh Nationalist Party	6
Socialist Party of Bangladesh–BaSaD	1
Independent(s) (Note: Includes BNP members who contested in elections disobeying party decisions.)	5
Total	44
