= 2022 Rangpur City Corporation election =

Mayor and council election in Bangladesh

- 27 December 2022
- Registered: 426,470 (▲8.27 pp)
- Turnout: 65.88% (▼8.35 pp)
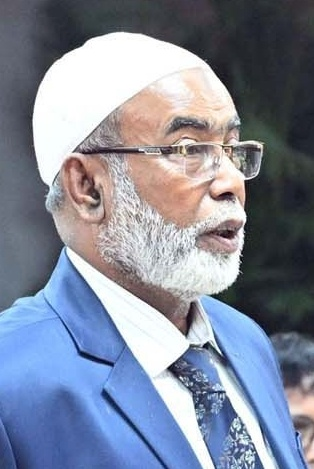
	First party	Second party	Third party
Candidate	Mostafizar Rahman Mostafa	Md. Amiruzzaman	Latifur Rahman Milon
Party	JP(E)	IAB	Independent
Popular vote	146,798	49,892	33,883
Percentage	52.44%	17.82%	12.10%
Swing	▼2.57pp	▲9.65pp	New
	Fourth party
Candidate	Hosne Ara Lutfa Dalia
Party	AL
Popular vote	22,309
Percentage	7.97%
Swing	▼13.22pp
Mayor before election
Mostafizar Rahman Mostafa
JP(E)
Elected Mayor
Mostafizar Rahman Mostafa
JP(E)
- Council election
- 27 December 2022; 44 seats in the Rangpur City Corporation (Note: Of the total 44 seats, one was won uncontested.); 15 January 2023 (Re-election in 1 seat)
Party	Leader	Seats	+/–
AL	Hosne Ara Lutfa Dalia	14	−5
JP(E)	Mostafizar Rahman Mostafa	9	−4
BNP	Didn't contest	2	−4
BSD	—	1	0
Independent	—	18	+13
This lists parties that won seats. See the complete results below.

The 2022 Rangpur City Corporation election was a local government election in the city of Rangpur, Bangladesh, held on 27 December 2022 to elect the Mayor of Rangpur and the Rangpur City Council. The election resulted in a victory for the Jatiya Party (Ershad) candidate Mostafizar Rahman Mostafa. In the 44-member City Council, the Awami League won 14 seats, while Jatiya Party won 9 seats, the Bangladesh Nationalist Party won 2 seats, the Socialist Party of Bangladesh won 1 seat, and independents won 18 seats. Jatiya Party's Mostafizar Rahman Mostafa held the mayoral post by winning in a huge margin with ruling Awami League's candidate landing as fourth.

Prior to the election, Rangpur was the only city held by the Jatiya Party (Ershad), the main opposition party in the Jatiya Sangsad. It was also one of the two city corporations which was held by other parties except Awami League. According to political analysts, the elections held significance for the Awami League-government and the newly formed Election Commission under Kazi Habibul Awwal- because election commissions under the government is accused by the Bangladesh Nationalist Party (BNP) of being a 'puppet commission' of the government to turn Bangladesh into a de facto one-party state under Awami League. As Cumilla City Corporation's mayoral post was lost by Bangladesh Nationalist Party to Awami League in an election in June same year, the accusations rose. (Note: Although many experts believed that the incumbent BNP-loyalist candidate lost because of grouping in the party and other 'party rebel' candidates.)

== Background ==
City Corporations or City Councils are the highest tier among the local councils of Bangladesh— usually composed of cities or metropolitan areas. Elections are held every five years to elect the mayors and ward councilors. Cities are divided into wards. A councilor is elected for each ward by the ward residents. For every three wards, another council seat is reserved for a woman, and is filled by the votes of the residents of those wards.

The Rangpur City Corporation (RpCC) is one of the 12 City Corporations in Bangladesh. It comprises the metropolitan Rangpur. It is further divided into 33 wards. The corporation in Rangpur was founded in 2012 and the first election was held the same year, electing Sharfuddin Ahmed Jhantu as the first mayor.

Politically, the Rangpur region is considered a 'bastion' of Jatiya Party, with also consisting a large number Awami League supporters. In the past two elections, first was won by an Awami League candidate who was a past member of Jatiya Party and the last was won by a Jatiya Party candidate.

== Candidacy ==
=== Mayoral election ===
Name	Election symbol	Party	References
Mostafizur Rahman Mostafa	Langol (Wooden hand-plough)	Jatiya Party (Ershad)	
Hosne Ara Lutfa Dalia	Nouka (Boat)	Bangladesh Awami League	
Md Amiruzzaman	Hatpakha (Hand fan)	Islami Andolon Bangladesh	
Abu Rayhan	Dab (Green coconut)	Bangladesh Congress	
Safiur Rahman	Moshal (Torch)	Jatiya Samajtantrik Dal	
Touhidur Rahman Mondol	Deyalghori (Wall clock)	Khelafat Majlish	
Khorshed Alam	Lal golap (Red rose)	Zaker Party	
Mehedi Hasan Bony	Horin (Deer)	Independent	
Latifur Rahman Milon	Hati (Elephant)	Independent	

== Mayoral election results ==
Candidate	Party	Votes	%
Mostafizar Rahman Mostafa	Jatiya Party (Ershad)	146,798	52.44
Amiruzzaman Hossain	Islami Andolan Bangladesh	49,892	17.82
Latifur Rahman Milon	Independent	33,883	12.10
Hosne Ara Lutfa Dalia	Bangladesh Awami League	22,309	7.97
Abu Raihan	Bangladesh Congress	10,549	3.77
Khorshed Alam	Zaker Party	5,809	2.08
Shafiar Rahman	Jatiya Samajtantrik Dal	5,156	1.84
Tauhidur Rahman Mondal	Khelafat Majlish	2,864	1.02
Mehedi Hasan Bony	Independent	2,679	0.96
Total		279,939	100.00
Valid votes		279,939	99.63
Invalid/blank votes		1,036	0.37
Total votes		280,975	100.00
Registered voters/turnout		426,470	65.88

== Council election results ==
=== Party-wise ===
2022 RpCC council election results (party-wise)
Party	Seats		
Party	Ward Councilors	Reserved Women Councilors	Total Councilors
Bangladesh Awami League	14	—	14
Jatiya Party-JaPa (Ershad)	6	3	9
Bangladesh Nationalist Party	2	—	2
Socialist Party of Bangladesh-BaSaD	1	—	1
Independent(s) (Note: Includes BNP members who contested in elections disobeying party decisions.)	10	8	18
Total	33	11	44

==== Ward-wise ====
List of winner councilors of 2022 RpCC election
Council seat	Winner party	Winner candidate
Ward Councilor 01	JaPa (E)	Rafiqul Islam
Ward Councilor 02	AL	Ghulam Sarwar Mirza
Ward Councilor 03	JaPa (E)	Aseq Ali
Ward Councilor 04	AL	Haradhan Chandra Roy
Ward Councilor 05	Independent	Mukhlesur Rahman
Ward Councilor 06	Independent	Abu Hasan Chanchal
Ward Councilor 07	Independent	Anwarul Islam
Ward Councilor 08	Independent	Afsar Ali
Ward Councilor 09	Independent	Nazrul Islam Dewani
Ward Councilor 10	Independent	Kamruzzaman
Ward Councilor 11	Independent	Wazedul Arefin
Ward Councilor 12	Independent	Maqbul Hossain (Note: BNP-affiliated politician, ran as independent.)
Ward Councilor 13	AL	Fazle Ilahi
Ward Councilor 14	BaSaD	Mamdel Hossain Sarker
Ward Councilor 15	AL	Zakaria Alam
Ward Councilor 16	AL	Aminur Rahman
Ward Councilor 17	AL	Abdul Ghaffar
Ward Councilor 18	Independent	Masud Rana
Ward Councilor 19	JaPa (E)	Mahmudur Rahman
Ward Councilor 20	AL	Tauhidul Islam
Ward Councilor 21	JaPa (E)	Mahabubar Rahman
Ward Councilor 22	AL	Mizanur Rahman
Ward Councilor 23	Independent	Liton Parvez
Ward Councilor 24	AL	Rafiqul Islam
Ward Councilor 25	Independent	Nurunnabi Fulu
Ward Councilor 26	AL	Shahzada Arman
Ward Councilor 27	Independent	Rezwar Al Mehedi
Ward Councilor 28	AL	Shahadat Hossain
Ward Councilor 29	AL	Harun Ur Rashid
Ward Councilor 30	AL	Jahangir Alam
Ward Councilor 31	JaPa (E)	Samsul Haque
Ward Councilor 32	AL	Shahadat Hussein
Ward Councilor 33	JaPa (E)	Minazul Islam
Reserved Women Councilor-1	Independent	Dilara Begum
Reserved Women Councilor-2	Independent	Sultana Parveen
Reserved Women Councilor-3	JaPa (E)	Muslemah Begum
Reserved Women Councilor-4	Independent	Shamima Akhter
Reserved Women Councilor-5	Independent	Moslema Begum
Reserved Women Councilor-6	Independent	Zahida Anwari
Reserved Women Councilor-7	JaPa (E)	Ferdousi Begum
Reserved Women Councilor-8	JaPa (E)	Hasna Banu
Reserved Women Councilor-9	Independent	Manoara Sultana
Reserved Women Councilor-10	Independent	Shazmin Nahar Sheuly
Reserved Women Councilor-11	Independent	Jharna Khatun
