= Mayor of Rangpur =

- Incumbent; Vacant since 19 August 2024
- Rangpur City Corporation
- Style: Honourable (formal)
- Type: Council Leader
- Member of: Rangpur City Corporation
- Seat: Nagar Bhaban, Rangpur
- Appointer: Electorate of Rangpur
- Term length: Five years, renewable
- Constituting instrument: The City Corporation act, 2009
- Inaugural holder: Sharfuddin Ahmed Jhantu
- Formation: 28 June 2012; 14 years ago
- Salary: ৳150000 (US$1,200) per month (incl. allowances)
- Website: www.rpcc.gov.bd

The mayor of Rangpur City is the highest ranking official of the Rangpur City Corporation in Bangladesh. The mayor's office administers all city services, public property, most public agencies, and enforces all city and state laws within Rangpur City.

The mayor's office is located in Nagar Bhaban; it has jurisdiction over all 33 wards of Rangpur City.

== List of officeholders ==
Political parties

- Bangladesh Awami League
- Jatiya Party (Ershad)

Other factions

- Independent

Status

- Acting Mayor and Administrator

No.	Portrait	Officeholder (birth–death)	Election	Term of office			Designation	Political party	Reference
No.	Portrait	Officeholder (birth–death)	Election	From	To	Period	Designation	Political party	Reference
1		Sharfuddin Ahmed Jhantu (1952-2018)	2012	28 June 2012	20 December 2017	5 years, 145 days	Mayor	Bangladesh Awami League	
2		Mostafizur Rahman Mostafa	2017; 2022	21 December 2017	19 August 2024	6 years, 272 days	Mayor	Jatiya Party (Ershad)	
–		Md. Zakir Hossain	–	19 August 2024	Incumbent	2 years, 19 days	Administrator	Independent	

== Election ==
=== Election Result 2022 ===
Rangpur Mayoral Election 2022
Party	Candidate	Votes	%	±%
JP(E)	Mostafizur Rahman Mostafa	146,798	52.44	−2.57
IAB	Md. Amiruzzaman Hossain	49,892	17.82	+9.65
Independent	Latifur Rahman Milon	33,883	12.10	+11.31
AL	Hosne Ara Lutfa Dalia	22,309	7.97	−13.22
Majority		96,906	34.28	−1.54
Turnout		252,882	65.88	−8.35
Registered electors		426,469		
JP(E) hold				

=== Election Result 2017 ===
Rangpur Mayoral Election 2017
Party	Candidate	Votes	%	±%
JP(E)	Mostafizur Rahman Mostafa	159,824	55.01	–
AL	Sharfuddin Ahmed Jhantu	61,557	21.19	—
BNP	Kawsar Zaman Babla	34,791	11.97	—
IAB	A. T. M. Golam Mostafa Babu	23,718	8.17	—
Independent	Hossain Maqbul Shahriar Asif	2,306	0.79	New
BSD	Abdul Quddus	1,245	0.43	—
NPP	Md. Selim Akhter	807	0.28	New
Rejected ballots		6,273	2.16	
Majority		98,267	33.82	—
Turnout		290,521	74.23	—
Registered electors		391,366		
JP(E) hold				
