= Zamindars of Mahipur =

Zamindari estate

Zamindars of Mahipur মহিপুরের জমিদার
- Current region: Mahipur, Rangpur District, Bangladesh
- Earlier spellings: Chakladars of Qazirhat, Choudhuries of Bherbheri
- Members: Khan Bahadur Abdul Majid Chowdhury
- Estate: Mahipur Estate

The zamindars of Mahipur (Bengali: মহিপুরের জমিদার) were a Bengali aristocratic family of feudal landowners. The zamindari estate encompassed the Chakla of Qazirhat under the Cooch Behar State since the Mughal period. Although their aristocratic status was lost with the East Bengal State Acquisition and Tenancy Act of 1950, the Mahipur estate remains an important part of the history of Rangpur and belongs to one of the eighteen ancient zamindar families of Rangpur. The zamindari palace was lost as a result of flooding from the Teesta River, although the mosque, cemetery, polished reservoir and large draw-well can still be seen today.

== Location ==
The family is based in the village of Mahipur, which is presently in Lakkhitari Union, Gangachara Upazila of northern Bangladesh's Rangpur District. The village was formally known as Narsingha but was later renamed to Mahipur in honour of Emperor Mahipala. However, locals continue to refer to the village as Bherbheri, after a little beel which used to border the village. The Bherbheri beel merged with the Teesta River many years ago.

== History ==
=== Early history ===
The family were said to have held property in the Rangpur region since the eleventh century. In the early eighteenth century, the Cooch Behar State's military commander-in-chief Arif Muhammad was appointed the Choudhury of 4.5 units of land (including Mahipur) to collect the revenue of these areas. After submitting to the Mughal Empire in 1711, he became the zamindar of the Qazirhat pargana/chakla which included the areas of Qazirhat, Mahipur, Tushbhandar, Tepa and Dimla.

After the death of Arif Muhammad Choudhury, his son Khulu Muhammad Choudhury became the next zamindar of Mahipur. He was then succeeded by Arif's brother Khayrullah Choudhury who sold a significant portion of the estate. After the latter's death, the estate was split between his wife Anarkali Begum and his son Majarullah Choudhury.

During the time of the Permanent Settlement in 1793, Arif Muhammad's son Muhammad Amin Choudhury had become the zamindar and many small rent-free taluks were created in the zamindari. As a result, income narrowed and government debt increased. He was succeeded by Inayatullah Choudhury (b. 1832), who was a member of the Rangpur District Education Committee under the Rajshahi Divisional Commissioner in 1873. He contributed to turning Rangpur Zilla School into a higher English school. The zamindari fell into bankruptcy as a result of his luxurious lifestyle, and he had to sell a large part of the estate.

=== 19th and 20th centuries ===
Inayatullah was succeeded by Shaykh Ziaullah Choudhury, also known as Baura Korta.

- Ziaullah's elder son Abdul Wajid Choudhury (born 1857) was an honorary magistrate and a member of the Rangpur District Board as well as the municipal board. He studied at Rangpur Zilla School, and later founded his own school, madrasa and public dispensary. In 1898, the British Raj awarded him the title of Khan Bahadur as part of the 1898 New Year Honours.
- His other son Khan Bahadur Abdul Majid Chowdhury (1860-1912) was the most prominent zamindar of the family and become so, after his father Ziaullah's death in 1883. Abdul Majid constructed the Mahipur Mosque along with his father during his lifetime. He studied in Rangpur Zilla School until 1879, and then graduated from Calcutta Alia Madrasa in 1881. In 1896, the British Raj awarded him the title of Khan Bahadur as part of the 1896 New Year Honours. He had a successful term as zamindar, honorary magistrate, Rangpur District Board member from 1892 to 1912, and various other roles. The Mahipur Zamindari had a revenue of 25,000 takas under him. In 1898, he became the inaugural president of the Rangpur branch of Syed Ameer Ali's Central National Muhammedan Association. His founded Munshipara Madrasa was visited by the Governor John Woodburn on 11 July 1989, and subsequently all of the Alia Madrasas of Rangpur received funds from the District Board as well as the Mohsin Fund. Abdul Majid was also the founding vice-president of the Rangpur Sahitya Parishad, a regional Bengali-literary council, and was praised by Maniruzzaman Islamabadi. He was the founder of the Mahipur branch of Nur al-Iman, and a member of the All-India Compulsory Primary Education Execution Committee too. He died on 11 November 1912.

The zamindari was then split between Abdul Majid's son Abdul Aziz Choudhury (10.5 ana) and his daughter Majidatunnessa Chowdhurani (4.5 ana). Chowdhurani would lease her inheritance to her brother on an annual basis for 2200 takas, thus making him the zamindar of the entire estate. In 1916, he was among the 28 founders of the Carmichael College in Rangpur. The Mahipur Kuthi was his main cutcherry, which is still standing today, and is better known as Babu Miyar Bari, after one of his grandson who was the final zamindar.

As zamindar Khan Bahadur Abdul Aziz Choudhury did not have a son, his daughter Zahera Khatun became the next zamindar. She married Syed Husaynur Rahman of Dacca, who died in 1932 at the age of 27, leaving behind an eight-month son named Syed Shamsur Rahman, also known as Babu Mia. The zamindari estate was entrusted to her younger brother-in-law Syed Ataur Rahman before being passed on to Syed Shamsur Rahman when he turned 18 as per the Court of Wards. Most of the lands of the Mahipur zamindari was leased to wealthy Muslim zordar' such as the Basunias and Pramaniks. The rent was collected through the employees and deposited in the head-quarters cutcherry in Mahipur. Every Pohela Boishakh (Bengali New Year), the land lease was renewed by paying nazrana to the zamindar's house. The headquarters cutcherry was defended by foot-soldiers and musketeers of Mughal and Bihari origin. Most of the naibs (deputies) of the zamindar were Muslims. The final deputy was Charuchandra Rai, a Varendriya Kayastha from Pabna.

Syed Shamsur Rahman was noted as a zamindar for loving his tenants. However, the East Bengal State Acquisition and Tenancy Act of 1950 meant the abolishment of the zamindari system. He gave away 100 bighas of land under the law made by Sheikh Mujibur Rahman and distributed it all to the poor. He died in 2005, leaving behind a wife, son and three daughters.

== List of zamindars ==
Name	Term
ʿĀrif Muḥammad Choudhury عارف محمد چودھری আরিফ মুহাম্মদ চৌধুরী	1711
Khulu Muḥammad Choudhury خلو محمد چودھری খুলু মুহাম্মদ চৌধুরী	
Khayrullāh Choudhury خیرالله چودھری খয়রুল্লাহ চৌধুরী	
Ānārkalī Begum and Majarullāh Choudhury انارکلی بیگم و مجرالله چودھری আনারকলি বেগম ও মজর উল্লাহ চৌধুরী	
Muḥammad Amīn Choudhury محمد امین چودھری মুহাম্মদ আমিন চৌধুরী	1793
ʿInayatullāh Choudhury عنایت‌الله چودھری এনায়েত উল্লাহ চৌধুরী	1873
Shaykh Ḍiyāullāh Choudhury Baura Korta شیخ ضیاءالله چودھری باؤرا کرتا শেখ জিয়া উল্লাহ চৌধুরী বাউরা কর্তা	-1883
Khān Bahadur Mawlawī ʿAbd al-Majīd Choudhury خان بهادر مولوي عبد المجید چودھری খাঁন বাহাদুর মৌলভী আব্দুল মজিদ চৌধুরী	1883-1912
ʿAbd al-ʿAzīz Choudhury عبد العزیز چودھری খাঁন বাহাদুর আব্দুল আজিজ চৌধুরী	1912-
Ẓāhirah Khātūn ظاهرة خاتون জাহেরা খাঁতুন	-1950
Sayyid Shams ar-Raḥmān Bābū Miyān سيد شمس الرحمٰن بابو میاں সৈয়দ শামসুর রহমান বাবু মিঞা	1950

== See also ==
- Dulai Zamindari
