= Rangpur-1 =

Constituency of Bangladesh's Jatiya Sangsad

Coordinates: 25.85°N 89.22°E

- Constituency for the Jatiya Sangsad
- District: Rangpur District
- Division: Rangpur Division
- Electorate: 375,227 (2026)

Current constituency
- Created: 1973
- Party: Bangladesh Jamaat-e-Islami
- Member: Md. Rayhan Shirazi
- ← 18 Lalmonirhat-3 20 Rangpur-2 →

Rangpur-1 is a constituency represented in the Jatiya Sangsad (National Parliament) of Bangladesh since 2026 by Md. Rayhan Shirazi of the Bangladesh Jamaat-e-Islami.

== Boundaries ==
The constituency encompasses Gangachhara Upazila and wards 1 through 9 of Rangpur City Corporation.

== History ==
The constituency was created for the first general elections in newly independent Bangladesh, held in 1973.

Ahead of the 2014 general election, the Election Commission reduced the boundaries of the constituency. Previously it had also included three union parishads of Rangpur Sadar Upazila: Haridebpur, Pashuram, and Uttam.

Ahead of the 2018 general election, the Election Commission expanded the boundaries of the constituency to include wards 1 through 8 of Rangpur City Corporation.

Ahead of the 2026 general election, the Election Commission expanded the boundaries of the constituency to include an additional 9th ward of the Rangpur City Corporation.

== Members of Parliament ==
Election	Member	Party
1973	Abdur Rouf	Awami League
1979	Mashiur Rahman	Bangladesh Nationalist Party
1979 by-election	Shafiqul Ghani Swapan	Bangladesh Nationalist Party
Major Boundary Changes
1986	Moyezuddin Sarker	Jatiya Party (Ershad)
Sep 1991 by-election	Karimuddin Bharsa	Jatiya Party (Ershad)
1996	Sharfuddin Ahmed Jhantu	Jatiya Party (Ershad)
2001	Moshiur Rahman Ranga	Islami Jatiya Oikya Front
2008	Hossain Mokbul Shahriar	Jatiya Party (Ershad)
2014	Moshiur Rahman Ranga	Jatiya Party (Ershad)
2024	Asaduzzaman Bablu	Independent
2026	Md. Rayhan Shirazi	Bangladesh Jamaat-e-Islami

== Elections ==
=== Elections in the 2020s ===
General election 2026: Rangpur-1
Party	Candidate	Votes	%	±%
Jamaat	Md. Rayhan Shirazi	145,088		
BNP	Md. Mokarram Hossain Sujan	69,407		
Majority				
Turnout		225,836		
Registered electors		375,227		
Jamaat gain from Independent				

=== Elections in the 2010s ===
Moshiur Rahman Ranga was elected unopposed in the 2014 general election after opposition parties withdrew their candidacies in a boycott of the election.

=== Elections in the 2000s ===
General Election 2008: Rangpur-1
Party	Candidate	Votes	%	±%
JP(E)	Hossain Mokbul Shahriar	168,989	81.0	N/A
Jamaat	Muhammad Abdul Ghani	28,270	13.6	−14.6
Independent	Anwarul Islam	8,210	3.9	N/A
IAB	Md. Khairul Islam	2,101	1.0	N/A
Ganatantri Party	Saif Uddin Ahmed	741	0.4	N/A
PDP	Md. Abdul Kayum	313	0.2	N/A
Majority		140,719	67.5	+51.2
Turnout		208,624	85.2	+8.6
JP(E) gain from IJOF				

General Election 2001: Rangpur-1
Party	Candidate	Votes	%	±%
IJOF	Moshiur Rahman Ranga	77,812	44.6	N/A
Jamaat	Shah Md. Ruhul Islam	49,278	28.2	+6.8
AL	Md. Sharaf Uddin Ahmmed	47,109	27.0	+3.6
Independent	Md. Matiar Rahman	456	0.3	N/A
Majority		28,534	16.3	−10.9
Turnout		174,655	76.6	+7.9
IJOF gain from JP(E)				

=== Elections in the 1990s ===
General Election June 1996: Rangpur-1
Party	Candidate	Votes	%	±%
JP(E)	Sharfuddin Ahmed Jhantu	61,373	50.6	
AL	Mesbah Uddin Ahmed	28,373	23.4	
Jamaat	Shah Md. Ruhul Islam	25,923	21.4	
BNP	Ali Md. Jafar	3,610	3.0	
IOJ	Md. Therul Kabi	593	0.5	
WPB	Ruhini Chandra Barman	563	0.5	
Independent	Md. Samsul Alam	327	0.3	
Zaker Party	Md. Mozzamel Haque	206	0.1	
Independent	Md. Mostafa Kamal	163	0.1	
Independent	Md. Mosaddek Hossain	163	0.1	
Majority		33,000	27.2	
Turnout		121,294	68.7	
JP(E) hold				

Hussain Muhammad Ershad stood from jail for five seats in the 1991 general election: Rangpur-1, Rangpur-2, Rangpur-3, Rangpur-5, and Rangpur-6. After winning all five, he chose to represent Rangpur-3 and quit the other four, triggering by-elections in them. Karimuddin Bharsa, of the Jatiya Party (Ershad), was elected in a September 1991 by-election.

General Election 1991: Rangpur-1
Party	Candidate	Votes	%	±%
JP(E)	Hussain Muhammad Ershad	50,004	56.5	
AL	Md. Mojibar Rahman Pramanik	20,310	22.9	
Jamaat	Shah Md. Ruhul Islam	15,515	17.5	
NAP (Muzaffar)	Md. Sekendar Ali	1,220	1.4	
BNP	Md. Shah Emdadul Haq	695	0.8	
Zaker Party	Md. Ruhul Amin	464	0.5	
WPB	Md. Chad Miah	234	0.3	
UCL	A. K. M. Shirazul Islam	102	0.1	
Majority		29,694	33.5	
Turnout		88,547	54.3	
JP(E) hold				
