= Karim Uddin Bharsha =

Bangladeshi politician (died 2022)

Karimuddin Bharsa

Member of Bangladesh Parliament, Rangpur-1
- In office 1991–1996
- Preceded by: Moyezuddin Sarker
- Succeeded by: Sharfuddin Ahmed Jhantu

Rangpur-4
- In office 14 July 1996 – 27 October 2006
- Preceded by: Shah Alam
- Succeeded by: Tipu Munshi

Personal details
- Died: 23 July 2022 Evercare Hospital, Dhaka, Bangladesh
- Party: Jatiya Party (Ershad)
- Relations: Rahim Uddin Bharosha (brother)

Karimuddin Bharsha was a Bangladeshi entrepreneur and Jatiya Party (Ershad) politician and member of parliament for Rangpur-1 and Rangpur-4.

== Early life ==
Bharsha was born in Haragache, Kaunia Upazila, Rangpur District.

== Career ==
Bharsha was elected to parliament from Rangpur-1 as a Jatiya Party candidate in September 1991. The by-elections were called after Ershad, who was elected from five constituency including Rangpur-1, chose to resign and represent Rangpur-3. Bharsha was elected to parliament from Rangpur-4 as a Jatiya Party candidate in 1996 and 2001.

== Death ==
Bharsha died on 23 July 2022 in Evercare Hospital, Dhaka, Bangladesh.
