= 2025 Gangachara Hindu neighborhood attack =

2025 anti-Hindu attack in Gangachara

2025 Gangachara Hindu neighbourhood attack
- Location: Gangachara Upazila, Rangpur Sadar, Bangladesh
- Date: 26–27 July 2025
- Target: Local Hindu family
- Attack type: Attacks on homes, looting, arson, vandalism

The 2025 Gangachara Hindu neighbourhood attack refers to incidents of assault, vandalism, looting, and persecution against the Hindu community that took place on 26 and 27 July 2025 in Aldadpur Balapara village of Gangachara Upazila, Rangpur District. The attack was triggered by allegations of religious desecration. Over the course of two days, around 15–20 Hindu homes were vandalised and looted, and many families fled the area in fear. Despite the presence of law enforcement, allegations arose that the attacks continued.

Subsequently, a case was filed against nearly one thousand unidentified individuals, and several people were arrested. The incident was condemned by various political parties, human rights organizations, and educational institutions across the country.

== Attack ==
The unrest began on 26 July after a student was accused of hurting religious sentiments for sharing a Facebook post. However, claims later surfaced that the post had been made through a fake account created as part of a conspiracy. Nevertheless, the police arrested the student that evening. Even after he was taken into custody, tensions did not subside; more than a hundred people from nearby areas entered the village carrying sticks and chanting slogans. The following day, human chains were organized in the Banglabazar and Khilalganj areas of Kishoreganj, Nilphamari. After public announcements were made to gather people, at least 18 houses in the Hindu neighbourhood were vandalised in the afternoon.

From the night of 26 July to noon on 27 July, a group of people carried out vandalism and looting in about 12–20 houses of the Hindu community in the area. During this time, many Hindu families were forced to flee the village. Although police and army personnel were deployed to bring the situation under control, the attacks continued. Furniture, cattle, goats, cash, gold ornaments, and crops were looted from the affected houses. Later, the administration took initiatives to repair some of the damaged houses.

== After the incident ==
At Gangachara Model Police Station, a case was filed against 1,000–1,200 unidentified individuals in connection with the incident. Later, in a joint operation, five people were arrested; they were residents of the Kishoreganj Police Station area adjacent to Gangachara. The court granted a two-day remand for them. In addition, the army arrested a local journalist on charges of incitement during the attack. After evidence of involvement was found, he was placed on a three-day remand.

According to a local Union Parishad member, nearly 25 families fled the village in fear following the incident. Although there had been warnings about the possibility of such an attack, allegations arose that law enforcement failed to take adequate measures to prevent it.

== Reactions ==
On 29 July, in six separate statements, the Communist Party of Bangladesh, the State Reform Movement, the Ain o Salish Kendra (ASK), the Human Rights Support Society (HRSS), Nari Pokkho, and the Bangladesh Student Federation condemned the incident. They described the attacks on Hindu homes in Gangachara as human rights violations and demanded justice. Similarly, the Socialist Party of Bangladesh (BASAD), the Bangladesh Mahila Parishad, and the Udichi Shilpigoshthi also expressed concern and condemnation in separate statements. The Bangladesh Hindu Buddhist Christian Unity Council likewise demanded justice for the attacks.

Students of Jahangirnagar University organized a protest march, stating that the incident was alarming not only for the Hindu community but for all people. At the same time, progressive teachers from various public universities issued statements demanding a fair trial regarding the incident.

== See also ==
- Persecution of Hindus in Bangladesh
- 2024 Bangladesh anti-Hindu violence
