= Abdul Majid Chowdhury =

Bengali aristocrat

Khan Bahadur Moulvi Abdul Majid Chowdhury

Vice-President of the Rangpur Sahitya Parisat
- Preceded by: Position established

President of the Rangpur Muhammedan Association

Chairman of the Rangpur District Board

Personal details
- Born: 1860 Mahipur, Rangpur District, Bengal Presidency
- Died: 11 November 1912 (aged 51–52)
- Education: Rangpur Zilla School
- Alma mater: Calcutta Alia Madrasa
- Awards: Khan Bahadur

Khan Bahadur Moulvi Abdul Majid Chowdhury (1860 – 11 November 1912) was a Bengali educationist.

== Early life ==
Chowdhury was born in 1860, in the village of Mahipur, Rangpur district, Bengal Presidency. He belonged to a Bengali zamindar family of Muslim Chowdhuries. His father, Ziaullah Chowdhury, was the Zamindar of Mahipur. They were direct descendants of Arif Muhammad Choudhury, the military commander-in-chief of the Cooch Behar State and later the Chakladar of Qazirhat under the Bengal Subah. In 1879, Chowdhury passed his entrance examination from the Rangpur Zilla School. In 1881, he graduated from the Calcutta Alia Madrasa.

== Career ==
Chowdhury assisted his father in the construction project for the Mahipur Mosque within the zamindari estate. He succeeded his father as the Zamindar of Mahipur in 1883, and generated 25 thousand takas in revenue. Chowdhury was a member of the Rangpur District Board from 1890 to 1912, eventually becoming its chairman. At the 1896 New Year Honours, he was awarded Khan Bahadur by the British Raj. Chowdhury was elected as the president of the Central National Muhammedan Association (Rangpur Unit) under Syed Ameer Ali in 1898. He was the founding vice-president of the Rangpur Sahitya Parisat branch of the Bangiya Sahitya Parishat, and was praised by Maniruzzaman Islamabadi. Chowdhury was the founder of the Mahipur branch of Nur al-Iman, established by Mirza Muhammad Yusuf Ali, and a member of the All-India Compulsory Primary Education Execution Committee too. He was the founder of the Munshipara Madrasa. On 11 July 1899, he hosted John Woodburn, the Lieutenant Governor of Bengal, at the madrasa. He submitted a proposal to the British government with regards to madrasa education which was accepted, and successfully campaigned in favour of compulsory primary education in 1911. He also contributed to the inclusion of the Maktab system in the grants programme. All of the Alia Madrasas across the Rangpur district subsequently received grants from the Mohsin Fund and Rangpur District Board through his efforts. Chowdhury also served as an honorary magistrate. He played an active role at the first annual conference of the Bengal Provincial Educational Society.

== Death ==
Chowdhury died on 11 November 1912.
