= Rangpur City Corporation =

Local governing body of Rangpur, Bangladesh

Coordinates: 25°46′26.77″N 89°11′27.79″E

Rangpur City Corporation রংপুর সিটি কর্পোরেশন
- Emblem of the Rangpur City Corporation

Type
- Type: City Corporation

History
- Founded: June 28, 2012; 14 years ago
- New session started: 19 August 2024

Leadership
- Mayor: Vacant since 19 August 2024
- Administrator: Md. Shahidul Islam since 19 August 2024
- Deputy Mayor: Vacant since 7 July 2020
- Chief Executive Officer: Umme Fatima since 9 May 2024

Structure
- Seats: Vacant seats: 44 councillors
- Length of term: Up to five years

Elections
- Voting system: First past the post
- First election: 28 June 2012
- Last election: 27 December 2022
- Next election: TBD

Meeting place
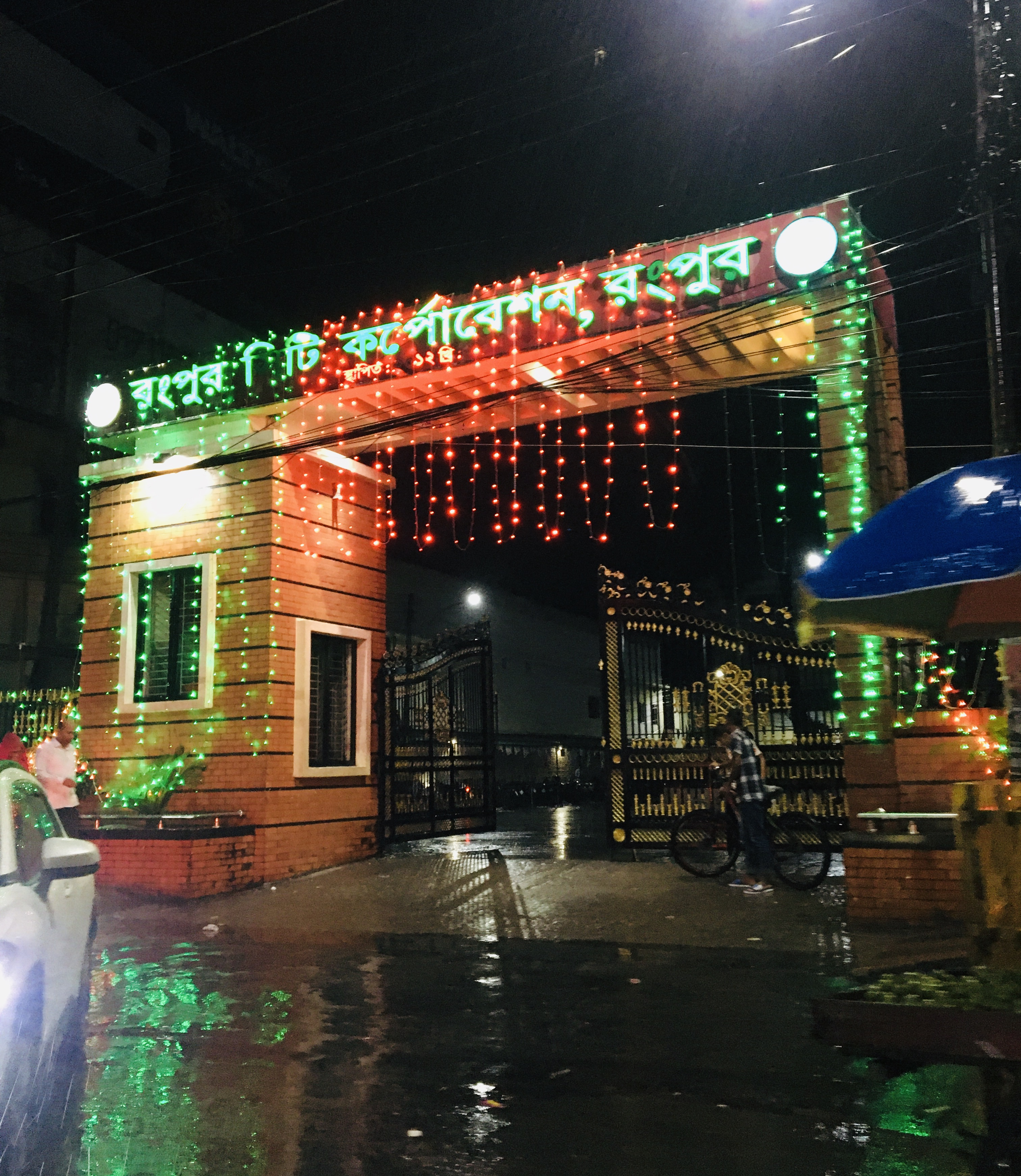
- Rangpur City Corporation

Website
- rpcc.gov.bd

Rangpur City Corporation mahallah geocode map

Rangpur City Corporation (Bengali: রংপুর সিটি কর্পোরেশন; abbreviated as RPCC), is a local government authority responsible for administering all civic services in the Rangpur, the city of Bangladesh. The RPCC government is elected by popular vote every five years. The corporation is headed by a mayor, who oversees a council consisting of 44 councillors representing different wards of the city. The functions and powers of the RPCC are defined under the provisions of The City Corporation act, 2009.

== About ==
Rangpur City Corporation was established on 28 June 2012. The RPCC government is elected by popular vote every five years, with the Mayor serving as the head of the corporation. The Mayor is supported by a council of 44 elected councillors who represent different wards of the city.

== Functions and Services ==
The Rangpur City Corporation (RPCC) is responsible for administering the city and ensuring the provision of essential infrastructure and public services. Its functions include urban planning, transport management, healthcare, education, waste management, water supply, and security. Through these services, RPCC aims to improve the quality of life for residents and promote sustainable urban development.

== Annual budget ==
The Rangpur City Corporation has announced a budget of ৳718.89 crore (US$59 million) for the 2025-2026 fiscal year.

== Roads ==
=== College Road, Rangpur ===
College Road, Rangpur is a major road in Rangpur, Bangladesh, named after Carmichael College located on it. The road is lined with colleges, shops, and residences and serves as a busy hub for education, commerce, and daily traffic.

=== R.K Road, Rangpur ===
R.K. Road (short for Rangpur–Kurigram Road) is a prominent thoroughfare in Rangpur, Bangladesh. Historically, it served as the main route connecting Rangpur to Kurigram. Although new highway bypasses and road alignments have since taken over the direct connection to Kurigram, the acronym 'R.K. Road' remains in common local usage to identify this historic corridor.

Departments of Rangpur City Corporation
#	Departments	Functions / Services
1	Office of the Mayor	Executive leadership; overall city governance; policy direction; supervision and coordination of all RPCC departments
2	Chief Executive Office	Inter-departmental coordination; monitoring implementation of services and development projects
3	Administration and Establishment	Human resource management; staff recruitment, posting and promotion; internal discipline and service delivery oversight
4	Finance and Accounts	Budget preparation; financial planning; revenue and expenditure control; payment processing; accounts management; internal audit
5	Engineering	Road-cutting permission; building design approval; contractor registration; land demarcation certificates
6	Urban Planning and Development	Road, drain, bridge, culvert and footpath development; land development; planned residential areas; city beautification
7	Electricity	Installation and maintenance of street lights; lamp-post management; city illumination
8	Transportation and Communication	Urban transport management; traffic & parking control; emergency transport; corpse handling; bus terminal management; road roller & ambulance services
9	Waste Management and Cleaning	Solid waste collection and disposal; street cleaning; drain clearing; mosquito control; landfill management
10	Health	Hospital & clinic management; maternal & child immunization; vitamin A campaigns; midwifery and health technology training
11	Registrar	Birth & death certificates; nationality, inheritance & character certificates
12	Education and Cultural	Support for education and cultural activities such as coordination with public and private educational institutions; promotion of libraries, community centers, and city cultural programs.
13	Water Supply and Sewerage	Clean water supply and sewerage management in the entire city corporation.
14	Revenue	Trade license issuance & renewal; holding tax collection; shop/market allotment; lease and asset management
15	Security and Law and Order	City security; joint operations with RPMP; CCTV installation and monitoring
16	Magistracy	Arbitration-based case settlement; mobile courts; anti-adulteration drives
17	Housing and Public Works	Allocation, development and maintenance of residential plots, flats and metropolitan housing projects
18	Social welfare	Welfare programs for the poor, elderly, women and persons with disabilities; social assistance; community development initiatives
19	Environmental and Public health	Pollution control; sanitation monitoring; food safety; climate change adaptation and mitigation; urban greening and tree plantation
20	Disaster management and Relief	Disaster preparedness and response; emergency rescue operations; relief distribution during floods, cyclones, fires and other natural calamities
21	Religious Welfare	Support for religious festivals including Eid and Puja; regulation of Qurbani cattle markets; land allocation and logistical support for religious events

== Wards and councillors ==
Rangpur City Corporation is administratively divided into 33 wards. Each ward is represented by one elected councillor, while additional reserved women councillors are elected for groups of wards, as provided under the Local Government (City Corporation) Act.

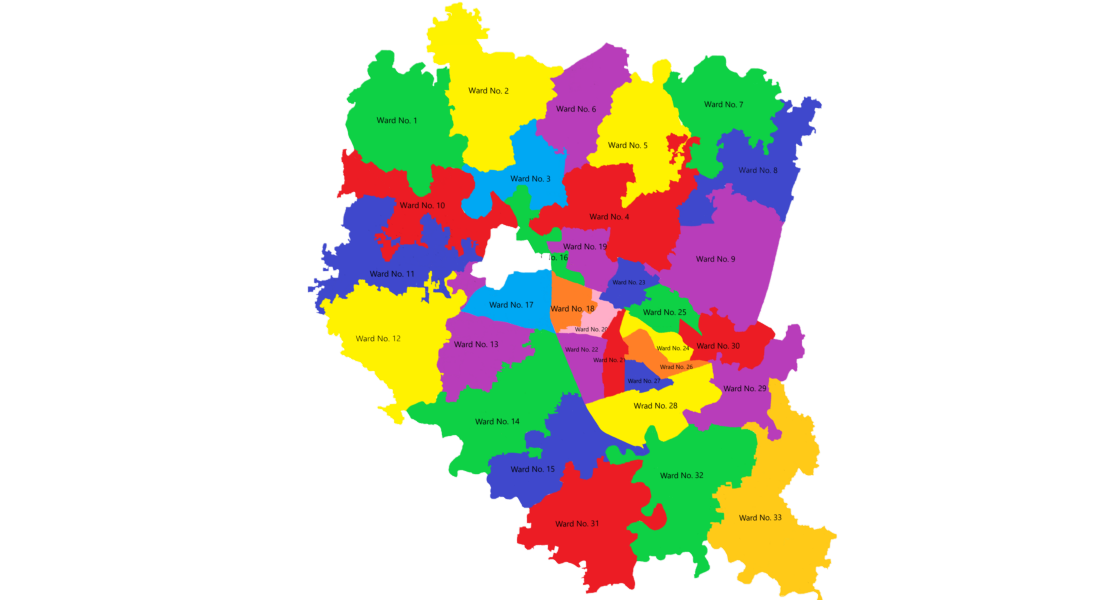
Ward serial of RPCC

#	Ward	Councillor	Party
1	Ward-1	Vacant	TBD
2	Ward-2	Vacant	TBD
3	Ward-3	Vacant	TBD
4	Ward-4	Vacant	TBD
5	Ward-5	Vacant	TBD
6	Ward-6	Vacant	TBD
7	Ward-7	Vacant	TBD
8	Ward-8	Vacant	TBD
9	Ward-9	Vacant	TBD
10	Ward-10	Vacant	TBD
11	Ward-11	Vacant	TBD
12	Ward-12	Vacant	TBD
13	Ward-13	Vacant	TBD
14	Ward-14	Vacant	TBD
15	Ward-15	Vacant	TBD
16	Ward-16	Vacant	TBD
17	Ward-17	Vacant	TBD
18	Ward-18	Vacant	TBD
19	Ward-19	Vacant	TBD
20	Ward-20	Vacant	TBD
21	Ward-21	Vacant	TBD
22	Ward-22	Vacant	TBD
23	Ward-23	Vacant	TBD
24	Ward-24	Vacant	TBD
25	Ward-25	Vacant	TBD
26	Ward-26	Vacant	TBD
27	Ward-27	Vacant	TBD
28	Ward-28	Vacant	TBD
29	Ward-29	Vacant	TBD
30	Ward-30	Vacant	TBD
31	Ward-31	Vacant	TBD
32	Ward-32	Vacant	TBD
33	Ward-33	Vacant	TBD
Reserved Women's Councillor
34	Reserved women's seat-1	Vacant	TBD
35	Reserved women's seat-2	Vacant	TBD
35	Reserved women's seat-3	Vacant	TBD
37	Reserved women's seat-4	Vacant	TBD
38	Reserved women's seat-5	Vacant	TBD
39	Reserved women's seat-6	Vacant	TBD
40	Reserved women's seat-7	Vacant	TBD
41	Reserved women's seat-8	Vacant	TBD
42	Reserved women's seat-9	Vacant	TBD
43	Reserved women's seat-10	Vacant	TBD
44	Reserved women's seat-11	Vacant	TBD

== List of mayors ==
Political parties

- Bangladesh Awami League
- Jatiya Party (Ershad)

Other factions

- Independent

Status

- Acting Mayor and Administrator

No.	Portrait	Officeholder (birth–death)	Election	Term of office			Designation	Political party	Reference
No.	Portrait	Officeholder (birth–death)	Election	From	To	Period	Designation	Political party	Reference
1		Sharfuddin Ahmed Jhantu (1952-2018)	2012	28 June 2012	20 December 2017	5 years, 145 days	Mayor	Bangladesh Awami League	
2		Mostafizur Rahman Mostafa	2017; 2022	21 December 2017	19 August 2024	6 years, 272 days	Mayor	Jatiya Party (Ershad)	
–		Md. Zakir Hossain	–	19 August 2024	Incumbent	1 year, 361 days	Administrator	Independent	

== Past election ==
=== Election Result 2022 ===
Rangpur Mayoral Election 2022
Party	Candidate	Votes	%	±%
JP(E)	Mostafizur Rahman Mostafa	146,798	52.44	−2.57
IAB	Md. Amiruzzaman Hossain	49,892	17.82	+9.65
Independent	Latifur Rahman Milon	33,883	12.10	+11.31
AL	Hosne Ara Lutfa Dalia	22,309	7.97	−13.22
Majority		96,906	34.28	−1.54
Turnout		252,882	65.88	−8.35
Registered electors		426,469		
JP(E) hold				

=== Election Result 2017 ===
Rangpur Mayoral Election 2017
Party	Candidate	Votes	%	±%
JP(E)	Mostafizur Rahman Mostafa	159,824	55.01	–
AL	Sharfuddin Ahmed Jhantu	61,557	21.19	—
BNP	Kawsar Zaman Babla	34,791	11.97	—
IAB	A. T. M. Golam Mostafa Babu	23,718	8.17	—
Independent	Hossain Maqbul Shahriar Asif	2,306	0.79	New
BSD	Abdul Quddus	1,245	0.43	—
NPP	Md. Selim Akhter	807	0.28	New
Rejected ballots		6,273	2.16	
Majority		98,267	33.82	—
Turnout		290,521	74.23	—
Registered electors		391,366		
JP(E) hold				
