= Md. Rayhan Shirazi =

Bangladeshi politician

Rayhan Shirazi
- রায়হান সিরাজী
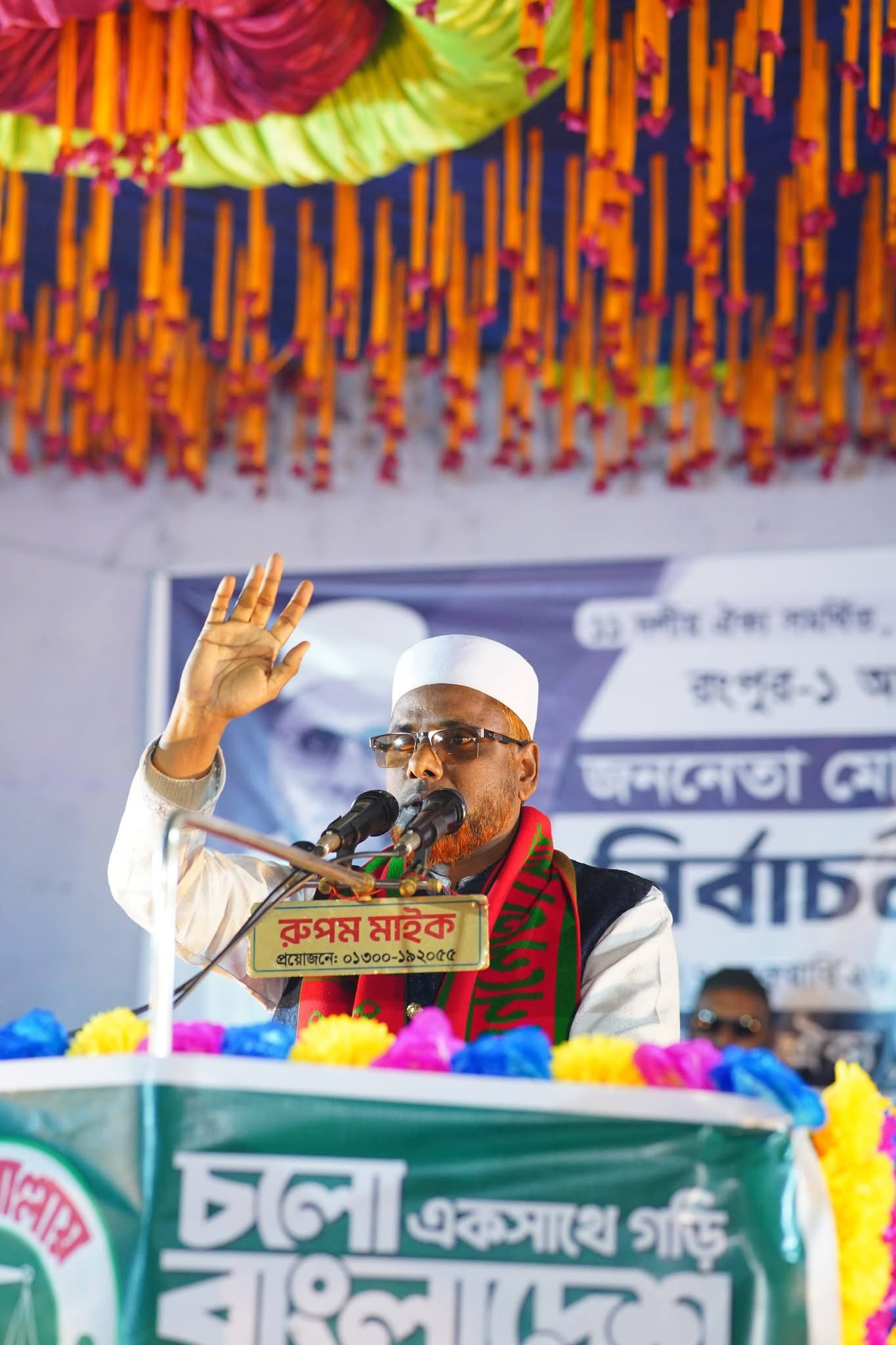
- Shirazi in 2026

Member of Parliament
- Incumbent
- Assumed office 17 February 2026
- Preceded by: Asaduzzaman Bablu
- Constituency: Rangpur-1

Personal details
- Born: July 3, 1979 (age 47) Rangpur District, Bangladesh
- Party: Bangladesh Jamaat-e-Islami
- Occupation: Politician

Md. Rayhan Shirazi is a Bangladeshi politician affiliated with Bangladesh Jamaat-e-Islami. He is an elected member of parliament from the Rangpur-1 constituency.
