= Mohammad Owais =

Advocate Mohammad Owais Sarkar
- মুহম্মদ ওয়ায়েছ

Member of the National Assembly of Pakistan
- In office 1965–1969
- Preceded by: Mohammad Amin
- Succeeded by: Lutfor Rahman
- Constituency: NE-4 (Rangpur-IV)

Member of the East Bengal Legislative Assembly
- In office 1947–1954
- Preceded by: Safiruddin Ahmed
- Constituency: Rangpur North

Personal details
- Born: Betgari, Rangpur District, Bengal Presidency
- Died: Betgari, Rangpur District
- Party: Muslim League
- Relatives: Kazi Abdul Kader (brother-in-law)
- Education: University of Calcutta

Mohammad Owais (Bengali: মুহম্মদ ওয়ায়েছ) was a Bangladeshi politician who served at the East Bengal Legislative Assembly and National Assembly of Pakistan.

== Early life and education ==
Mohammad Owais was born into a Bengali Muslim family of Sarkars in the Miapara neighbourhood of Betgari in Rangpur District, Bengal Presidency. He was the son of Abdur Rahim Sarkar and was educated in Bengali, Arabic and Persian. Owais completed his Bachelor of Laws degree from the University of Calcutta.

== Career ==
Owais began his career as an advocate at the Rangpur Judge Court. As a senior lawyer, he served as PP in various occasions during British and Pakistan periods. He joined the Muslim League and was made a member of the East Bengal Legislative Assembly in 1947. Owais recited from the Qur'an during an assembly meeting in Karachi. He was elected to the NE-4 (Rangpur-IV) constituency at the National Assembly of Pakistan after the 1965 elections under the Basic Democracy system.

Owais and Kazi Abdul Kader co-operated in establishing the Rangpur Medical College. He purchased the Kakina zamindari in an auction and gifted it to the Lalmonirhat District Collectorate.

== Personal life ==
Owais married a woman from the Kazi family of Nilphamari. His younger brother-in-law was Kazi Abdul Kader. Owais had two sons; Mahfuzur Rahman of London and former sub-registrar Aminur Rahman.

== Death ==
Owais died in Rangpur District.
