= Rahim Uddin Bharosha =

Bangladesh Nationalist Party politician (1934–2020)

- রহিম উদ্দিন ভরসা

Member of the Bangladesh Parliament from the extinct Rangpur-10 (now Rangpur-4) seat
- In office 1979–1982

Personal details
- Born: 1934; Rangpur District
- Died: 11 March 2020; Dhaka, Bangladesh
- Political party: Bangladesh Nationalist Party
- Relations: Karim Uddin Bharsha (brother)
- Children: 3 sons and 2 daughters

Rahim Uddin Bharosha (1934-2020) was a Bangladeshi entrepreneur, Bangladesh Nationalist Party politician, and a member of parliament for the extinct Rangpur-10 seat (now Rangpur-4).

== Birth and early life ==
Rahim Uddin was born to Moner Uddin Paiker and Mosammat Nabijan Nesa in Rangpur District in 1934.

== Career ==
Bharosha was elected to parliament from Rangpur-4 as a Jatiya Party candidate in 1979.

== Death ==
Rahim Uddin Bharosha died on 11 March 2020.

== See also ==
- 1979 Bangladeshi general election
