= Moyenuddin Sarker =

Bangladeshi politician

Member of the Bangladesh Parliament for Rangpur-1
- In office 10 July 1986 – 6 December 1990
- Preceded by: Shafiqul Ghani Swapan
- Succeeded by: Karimuddin Bharsa

Personal details
- Born: March 29, 1929 Sherpur Kismat, Bengal Presidency, British India
- Died: 15 March 1998 (aged 68)
- Party: Jatiya Party (Ershad)

Moyenuddin Sarker (1929–1998) is a Jatiya Party (Ershad) politician and a former member of parliament for Rangpur-1.

== Biography ==
Moyenuddin Sarker was born on 29 March 1929 in the village of Sherpur Kismat (now in Betgari Union of Gangachara Upazila, Rangpur District, Bangladesh). His father was Kasim Uddin Sarkar. Moyenuddin Sarker completed a B.A.

Days ahead of the 1970 Pakistani general election, Sarker and several other candidates withdrew. They argued that participation was improper while millions were in desperate need after the 1970 Bhola cyclone.

Sarker was elected to parliament from Rangpur-1 as a Jatiya Party candidate in 1986 and 1988.

Sarkar died on 15 March 1998.
