= Tipu Munshi =

Bangladeshi politician

- টিপু মুনশি
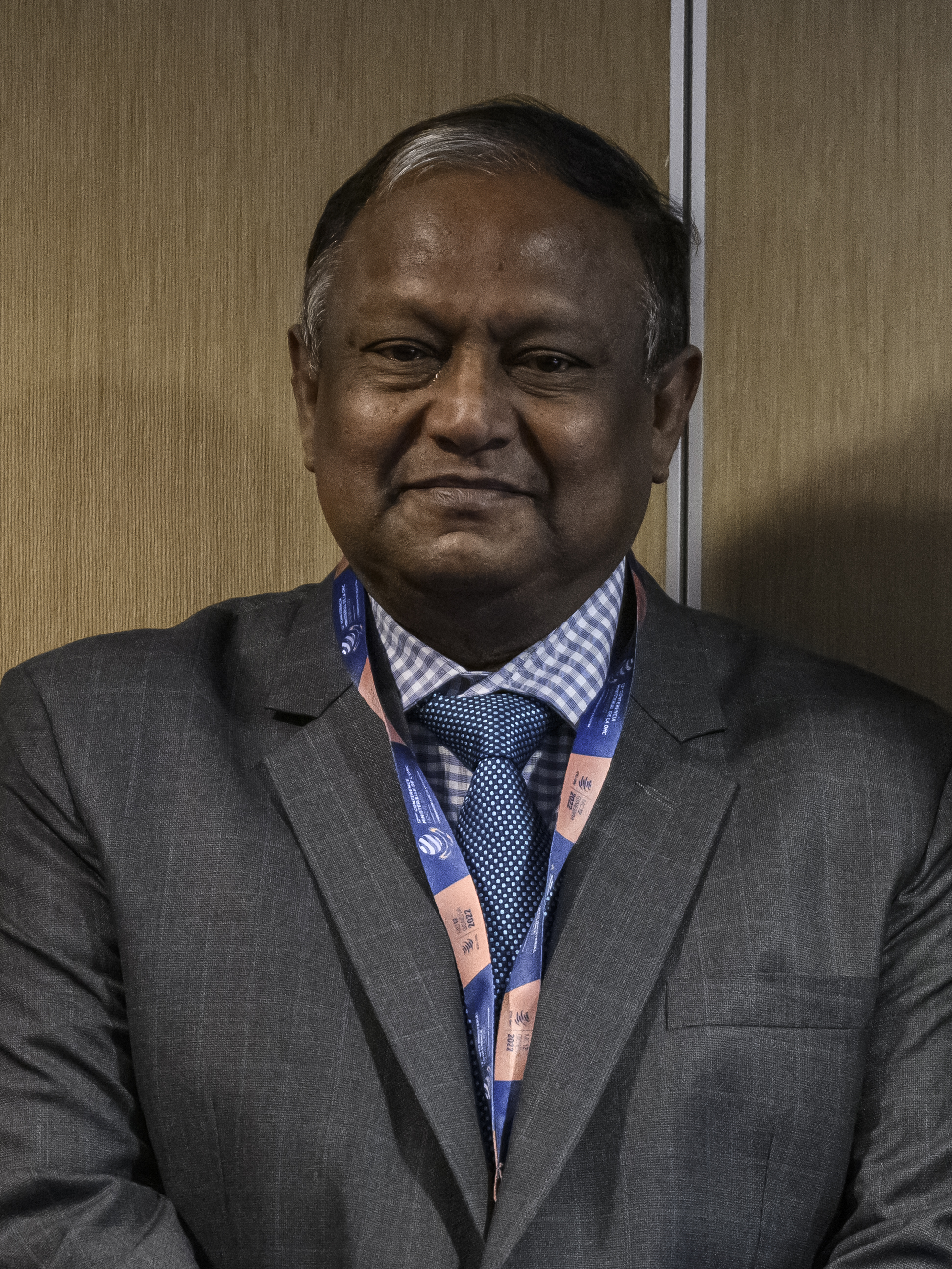
- Munshi at the European Union in Brussels (2022)

Minister of Commerce
- In office 7 January 2019 – 10 January 2024
- Prime Minister: Sheikh Hasina
- Preceded by: Tofail Ahmed
- Succeeded by: Ahasanul Islam Titu

Member of the Bangladesh Parliament for Rangpur-4
- In office 25 January 2009 – 6 August 2024
- Preceded by: Karim Uddin Bharsha
- Succeeded by: Akhter Hossen

Personal details
- Born: 25 August 1950 (age 75) Rangpur, East Bengal, Dominion of Pakistan
- Party: Bangladesh Awami League

Tipu Munshi (born 25 August 1950) is an Awami League politician and a former Jatiya Sangsad member representing the Rangpur-4 constituency during 2009–2024. He served as the minister of commerce during 2019–2024.

== Early life ==
Munshi was born on 25 August 1950 in Gopalganj District, Bangladesh. His family later moved to Rangpur District. He has a bachelor's degree from Government Titumir College.

== Career ==
Munshi was elected to parliament from Rangpur-4 on 5 January 2014 as a Bangladesh Awami League candidate. He was the managing director of Sepal Group. He was the former chair of the Parliamentary Standing Committee on Ministry of Home Affairs between 2014 and 2018. He is a former president of the Bangladesh Garment Manufacturers and Exporters Association. Munshi is a founder member of the Board of Trustees of BUFT (BGMEA University of Fashion & Technology). He is a director of STS group, the holding company of Apollo Hospital Dhaka.

Mr. Munshi served as the Minister of Commerce of Bangladesh from January 2019 to January 2024, where he was active in implementing policies that bolstered trade and commerce. His tenure saw multiple initiatives aimed at simplifying trade procedures to enhance Bangladesh's competitiveness in the global market. He advocated for comprehensive knowledge of trade documentation and customs procedures as essential for building competitiveness, reflecting his understanding of the intricacies of international trade. He also played a role in ensuring that the garment industry was not decimated during the COVID-19 pandemic closure and advocated for the industry so that the wages of the 4.22 million garment workers could be ensured through terms loans from the government to the industry.

In September 2022, during a conference hosted by the National Garment Workers Federation, Munshi supported demands to raise the pay of garment factory workers, stating that they had toiled to make the country prosperous and deserved better wages in light of rising inflation caused by the Russian invasion of Ukraine.

At the aftermath of the 2024 Bangladesh quota reform movement and the 2024 non-cooperation movement that removed him and other members of the Sheikh Hasina government from power, Munshi was arrested in Dhaka on 28 August for political reasons. After a 4-day remand, Munshi was sent to the jail.
