= Shah Abdur Razzak =

Bangladeshi politician

Member of Bangladesh Parliament
- In office 1986–1988
- Preceded by: Mujibur Rahman
- Succeeded by: Shah Alam

Personal details
- Died: 13 March 2018; Rangpur City, Rangpur District, Bangladesh
- Political party: Bangladesh Awami League

Shah Abdur Razzak is a Bangladesh Awami League politician and a former member of parliament for Rangpur-4.

== Career ==
Razzak was a veteran of the Bengali Language movement and Bangladesh Liberation war. He was elected to parliament from Rangpur-4 as a Bangladesh Awami League candidate in 1986.

== Death ==
Razzak died on 13 March 2018 in Rangpur City, Rangpur District, Bangladesh.
