= Rabeya Alim =

Bangladeshi politician

- রাবেয়া আলীম

Member of Bangladesh Parliament
- Incumbent
- Assumed office 2019

Member of 11th Jatiya Sangsad of Reserved Seats for Women

Member of Parliament for Reserved Women's Seat-23

Personal details
- Born: 1 January 1950 (age 76)
- Party: Bangladesh Awami League
- Spouse: Mohammad Alim Uddin
- Occupation: Housewife

Rabeya Alim is a Bangladesh Awami League politician and a member of the Bangladesh Parliament from a reserved seat.

== Career ==
Alim was elected to parliament from reserved seat as a Bangladesh Awami League candidate in 2019.
