= Mujibur Rahman (Ranjpur politician) =

Bangladeshi politician

Member of Bangladesh Parliament
- In office 1979–1986
- Preceded by: Mohammad Alim Uddin
- Succeeded by: Shah Abdur Razzak

Personal details
- Political party: Bangladesh Nationalist Party

Mujibur Rahman is a Bangladesh Nationalist Party politician and a former member of parliament for Rangpur-4.

== Career ==
Rahman was elected to parliament from Rangpur-4 as a Bangladesh Nationalist Party candidate in 1979.
