= Shah Alam (Bangladeshi politician) =

Bangladeshi politician

Member of Bangladesh Parliament
- In office 1988–1991
- Preceded by: Shah Abdur Razzak
- Succeeded by: Karim Uddin Bharsha

Personal details
- Party: Jatiya Party (Ershad)

Shah Alam is a Jatiya Party (Ershad) politician in Bangladesh and a former member of parliament for Rangpur-4.

== Career ==
Alam was elected to parliament from Rangpur-4 as a Jatiya Party candidate in 1988.
