= Rangpur-4 =

Constituency of Bangladesh's Jatiya Sangsad

Coordinates: 25.66°N 89.41°E

- Constituency for the Jatiya Sangsad
- District: Rangpur District
- Division: Rangpur Division
- Electorate: 509,905 (2026)

Current constituency
- Created: 1973
- Party: National Citizen Party
- Member: Akhter Hossen
- ← 21 Rangpur-3 23 Rangpur-5 →

Rangpur-4 is a constituency represented in the Jatiya Sangsad (National Parliament) of Bangladesh since 2026 by Akhter Hossen of the National Citizen Party.

== Boundaries ==
The constituency encompasses Kaunia and Pirgachha upazilas.

== History ==
The constituency was created for the first general elections in newly independent Bangladesh, held in 1973.

== Members of Parliament ==
Election	Member	Party
1973	Mohammad Alim Uddin	Awami League
1979	Mujibur Rahman	Bangladesh Nationalist Party
Major Boundary Changes
1986	Shah Abdur Razzak	Awami League
1988	Shah Alam	Jatiya Party (Ershad)
1996	Karim Uddin Bharsha	Jatiya Party (Ershad)
2001	Karim Uddin Bharsha	Islami Jatiya Oikya Front
2008	Tipu Munshi	Awami League
2014	Tipu Munshi	Awami League
2018	Tipu Munshi	Awami League
2024	Tipu Munshi	Awami League
2026	Akhter Hossen	National Citizen Party

== Elections ==
=== Elections in the 2020s ===
General election 2026: Rangpur-4
Party	Candidate	Votes	%	±%
NCP	Akhter Hossen	149,966		
BNP	Mohammad Emdadul Haque Bhorsa	140,564		
Majority				
Turnout		334,647		
Registered electors		509,905		
NCP gain from AL				

=== Elections in the 2010s ===
General Election 2014: Rangpur-4
Party	Candidate	Votes	%	±%
AL	Tipu Munshi	113,082	95.0	+54.3
JP(E)	Karim Uddin Bharsha	5,986	5.0	−30.5
Majority		107,096	89.9	+84.7
Turnout		119,068	32.3	−60.5
AL hold				

=== Elections in the 2000s ===
General Election 2008: Rangpur-4
Party	Candidate	Votes	%	±%
AL	Tipu Munshi	118,807	40.7	+13.7
JP(E)	Karim Uddin Bharsha	103,643	35.5	N/A
BNP	Rahim Uddin Bharsha	63,999	21.9	−12.3
IAB	Md. Bodiuzzaman	3,433	1.2	N/A
Independent	Shah Alam	1,204	0.4	N/A
PDP	Md. Abdul Kaium	490	0.2	N/A
Majority		15,164	5.2	+1.2
Turnout		291,576	92.8	+12.2
AL gain from IJOF				

General Election 2001: Rangpur-4
Party	Candidate	Votes	%	±%
IJOF	Karim Uddin Bharsha	93,631	38.2	N/A
BNP	Rahim Uddin Bharsha	83,825	34.2	+17.2
AL	Tipu Munshi	66,288	27.0	+5.0
WPB	Nazrul Islam Hakkani	791	0.3	−0.1
JSD	Md. Abdullah Al Mahmud	471	0.2	N/A
Jatiya Party (M)	Md. A. Samad	138	0.1	N/A
Majority		9,806	4.0	−20.3
Turnout		245,144	80.6	−0.2
IJOF gain from JP(E)				

=== Elections in the 1990s ===
General Election June 1996: Rangpur-4
Party	Candidate	Votes	%	±%
JP(E)	Karim Uddin Bharsha	84,377	46.3	−1.1
AL	Mohsin Ali Bengal	40,076	22.0	−2.5
BNP	Rahim Uddin Bharsha	30,908	17.0	−3.8
Jamaat	Momtaj Uddin	23,623	13.0	0.0
IOJ	Abdus Salim Sarkar	1,788	1.0	+0.4
WPB	Nazrul Islam Hakkani	793	0.4	N/A
Independent	Md. Enayet Ullaha	315	0.2	+0.1
Independent	Shah Alam	215	0.1	N/A
Independent	Shah Md. Rafiqul Bari	156	0.1	N/A
Majority		44,301	24.3	+1.3
Turnout		182,251	80.8	+13.9
JP(E) hold				

General Election 1991: Rangpur-4
Party	Candidate	Votes	%	±%
JP(E)	Shah Alam	76,253	47.4	
AL	Shah Abdur Razzak	39,325	24.5	
BNP	Rahim Uddin Bharsha	21,191	13.2	
Jamaat	Momtaj Uddin	20,956	13.0	
IOJ	Md. Mondal Golam Mostafa	922	0.6	
Zaker Party	Md. Akter Hossain	736	0.5	
FP	Md. Abdul Mannan Shardar	533	0.3	
UCL	Nazrul Islam Haqqani	292	0.2	
Independent	Md. Enayet Ullah	164	0.1	
Independent	Md. Hazi Mohsin Ali	153	0.1	
Jatiya Samajtantrik Dal-JSD	Md. Wazed Ali	147	0.1	
CPB	Shah Md. Abdul Haqim	82	0.1	
Majority		36,928	23.0	
Turnout		160,754	66.9	
JP(E) hold				
