= Mohammad Alim Uddin =

Bangladeshi politician

- মু. আলীম উদ্দিন

Member of Parliament for Rangpur-4
- In office 1973–1979
- Preceded by: Position established
- Succeeded by: Mujibur Rahman

Personal details
- Born: 14 February 1940
- Died: 18 August 2015 (aged 75) Nilphamari, Bangladesh
- Party: Bangladesh Awami League
- Spouse: Rabeya Alim

Mohammad Alim Uddin (14 February 1940 – 18 August 2015) was a Bangladesh Awami League politician, freedom fighter and a former member of parliament for Rangpur-4. He was elected at the first national parliamentary election in 1973.

== Biography ==
Muhammad Alim Uddin was born on 14 February 1940 to Anjema Khatun and Badiuzzaman.

Badiuzzaman was martyred early in the Bangladesh Liberation War. Uddin participated in the war from sector six.

Uddin was elected to parliament for Rangpur-4 in the 1973 Bangladeshi general election as an Awami League candidate. His wife, Rabeya Alim, was a member of the 11th National Parliament. They had a son and three daughters.

Uddin died on 18 August 2015 at his household at Notun Babupara Moholla of Syedpur Upazilla of Nilphamari District.
