= Mashiur Rahaman Ranga =

Bangladeshi politician

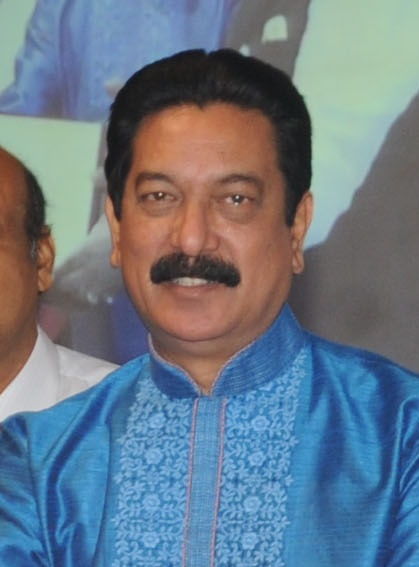
- Ranga in 2017

Minister of State for Rural Development and Co-operatives
- In office 14 January 2014 – 7 January 2019
- Prime Minister: Sheikh Hasina
- Preceded by: Jahangir Kabir Nanak
- Succeeded by: Swapan Bhattacharjee

Member of Parliament
- In office 29 January 2014 – 29 January 2024
- Preceded by: Hossain Mokbul Shahriar
- Succeeded by: Asaduzzaman Bablu
- Constituency: Rangpur-1
- In office 28 October 2001 – 27 October 2006
- Preceded by: Sharfuddin Ahmed Jhantu
- Succeeded by: Hossain Mokbul Shahriar
- Constituency: Rangpur-1

Personal details
- Born: 22 July 1958 (age 67)
- Party: Jatiya Party (Ershad)

Mashiur Rahaman Ranga (born 22 July 1958) is a Bangladeshi politician who is a former Jatiya Sangsad member for the Rangpur-1 constituency. He served as secretary general of the Jatiya Party as well as state minister of the Ministry of Local Government, Rural Development and Co-operatives.

== Career ==
Ranga is a transportation businessman. He was elected as a member of parliament from the Rangpur-1 constituency in 2001, 2014 and 2018. In September 2022 he was expelled from his party from all posts including the post of its presidium member.
