= Asaduzzaman Bablu =

Bangladeshi Member of Parliament

Md. Asaduzzaman Bablu

Member of the Bangladesh Parliament for Rangpur-1
- In office 11 January 2024 – 6 August 2024
- Preceded by: Mashiur Rahaman Ranga
- Succeeded by: Md Rayhan Shirazi
- Constituency: Rangpur-1

Personal details
- Born: 1986 (age 39–40) Gangachara Upazila, Rangpur District, Bangladesh
- Party: Independent (Awami League)

Md. Asaduzzaman Bablu (born 1986) is a Bangladeshi politician. He was elected in the 2024 Bangladeshi general election in Rangpur-1 as an Awami League-supporting Independent candidate.
