= Rangpur Sadar Upazila =

Rangpur Sadar রংপুর সদর
- Upazila
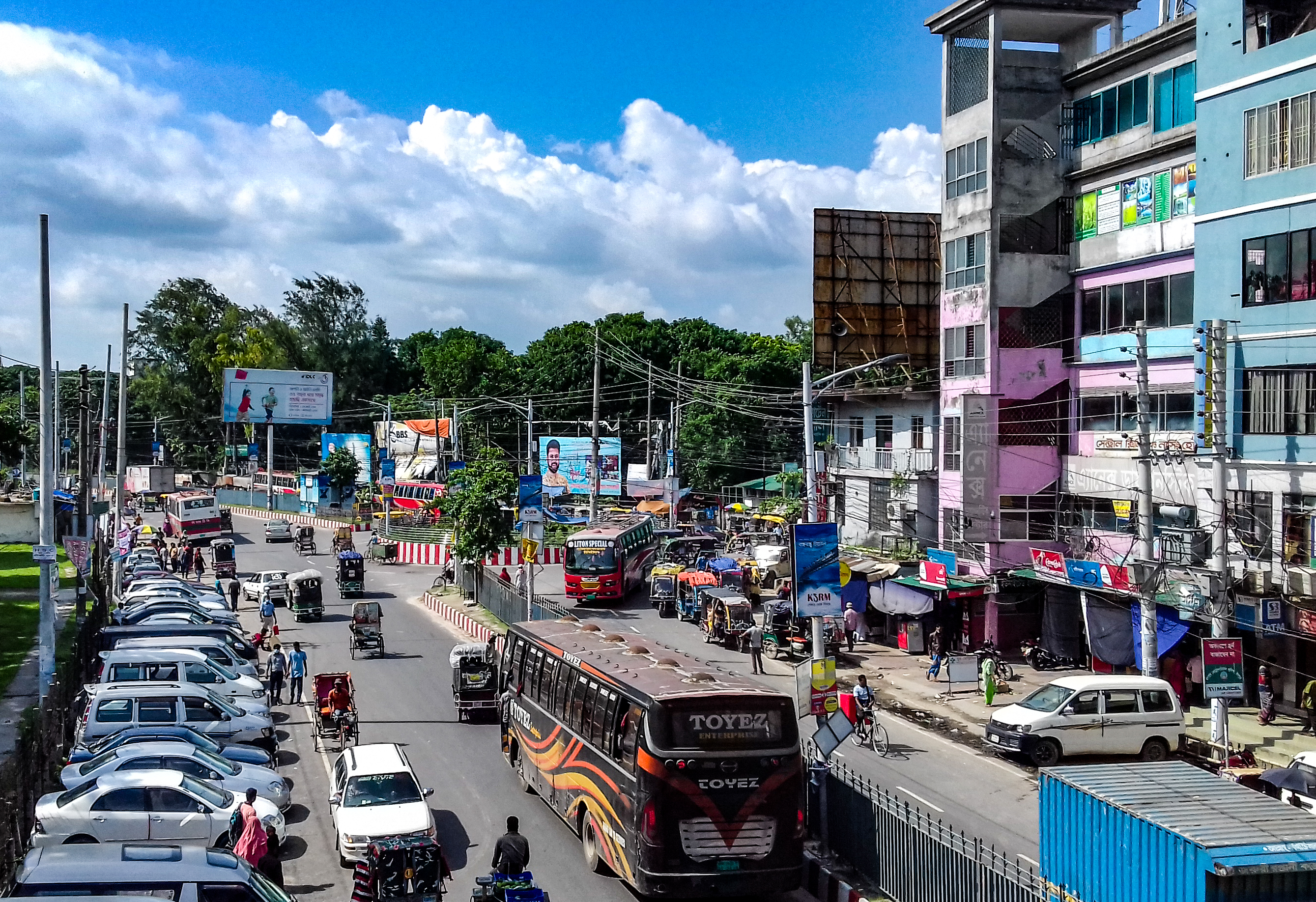
- Shahid Mukhtar Elahi intersection in Rangpur

- Coordinates: 25°45.5′N 89°14′E
- Country: Bangladesh
- Division: Rangpur
- District: Rangpur
- Headquarters: Rangpur

Area
  - Total: 137.9 km^{2} (53.2 sq mi)

Population (2022)
  - Total: 178,675
  - Density: 1,296/km^{2} (3,356/sq mi)
- Demonym(s): Rangpuri, Rongpuri
- Time zone: UTC+6 (BST)
- Postal code: 5400 -5409
- Area code: 0521
- Website: Official Map of Rangpur Sadar

Rangpur Sadar Upazila mauza geocode map

Rangpur Sadar (Bengali: রংপুর সদর) is an upazila of Rangpur District in Rangpur Division, Bangladesh. Its headquarters is located in Rangpur.

== History ==
Rangpur Sadar Upazila was established in 1983 from taking then Kotwali Thana area. It had 12 unions and a municipality before the establishment of Rangpur City Corporation. In 2011, the area of Sadar Upazila was reduced to 121.39 km and the number of unions reduced to 4 due to most of the unions becoming part of the newly established Rangpur City Corporation. In 2022, the Khaleya Union from Gangachara Upazila joined this upazila, and again the number of unions increased from 4 to 5, and the area of this upazila increased to 137.04 km^{2}.

== Geography ==
Rangpur Sadar Upazila is located at 25.7583°N 89.2333°E. It has a total area of 359.48 km^{2}.

== Demographics ==
Religions in Rangpur Sadar Upazila (2022)
Religion	Percent
Islam	84.44%
Hinduism	15.55%
Other or not stated	0.01%

According to the 2022 Bangladeshi census, Rangpur Sadar Upazila had 46,047 households and a population of 178,675. 9.31% of the population were under 5 years of age. Rangpur Sadar had a literacy rate (age 7 and over) of 68.24%: 69.88% for males and 66.66% for females, and a sex ratio of 97.98 males for every 100 females. 29,177 (16.33%) lived in urban areas.

According to the 2011 Census of Bangladesh, Rangpur Sadar Upazila had 165,017 households and a population of 718,203. 146,409 (20.39%) were under 10 years of age. Rangpur Sadar had a literacy rate (age 7 and over) of 60.99%, compared to the national average of 51.8%, and a sex ratio of 958 females per 1,000 males. 300,659 (41.86%) lived in urban areas.

As of the 1991 Bangladesh census by the Bangladesh Bureau of Statistics, Rangpur Sadar has a population of 494,317. Males constitute 52.44% of the population, and females 47.56%. This upazila's eighteen-and-up population is 251,530. Rangpur Sadar has an average literacy rate of 37.4% (7+ years), and the national average of 32.4% literate.

== Sports ==
Saddapuskuruni Jubo SC Rangpur is a team in the Bangladesh Women's Football League. It plays their home games at Palichara Stadium.

== Administration ==
Rangpur Sadar Upazila is divided into 5 union parishads: Chandanpat, Haridebpur, Mominpur, Khaleya, Sabyapushkarni, and Rangpur Cantonment. The union parishads are subdivided into 151 mauzas and 308 villages.

== See also ==
- Upazilas of Bangladesh
- Districts of Bangladesh
- Divisions of Bangladesh
- Administrative geography of Bangladesh
