= Gangachara Upazila =

Gangachara গংগাচড়া
- Upazila
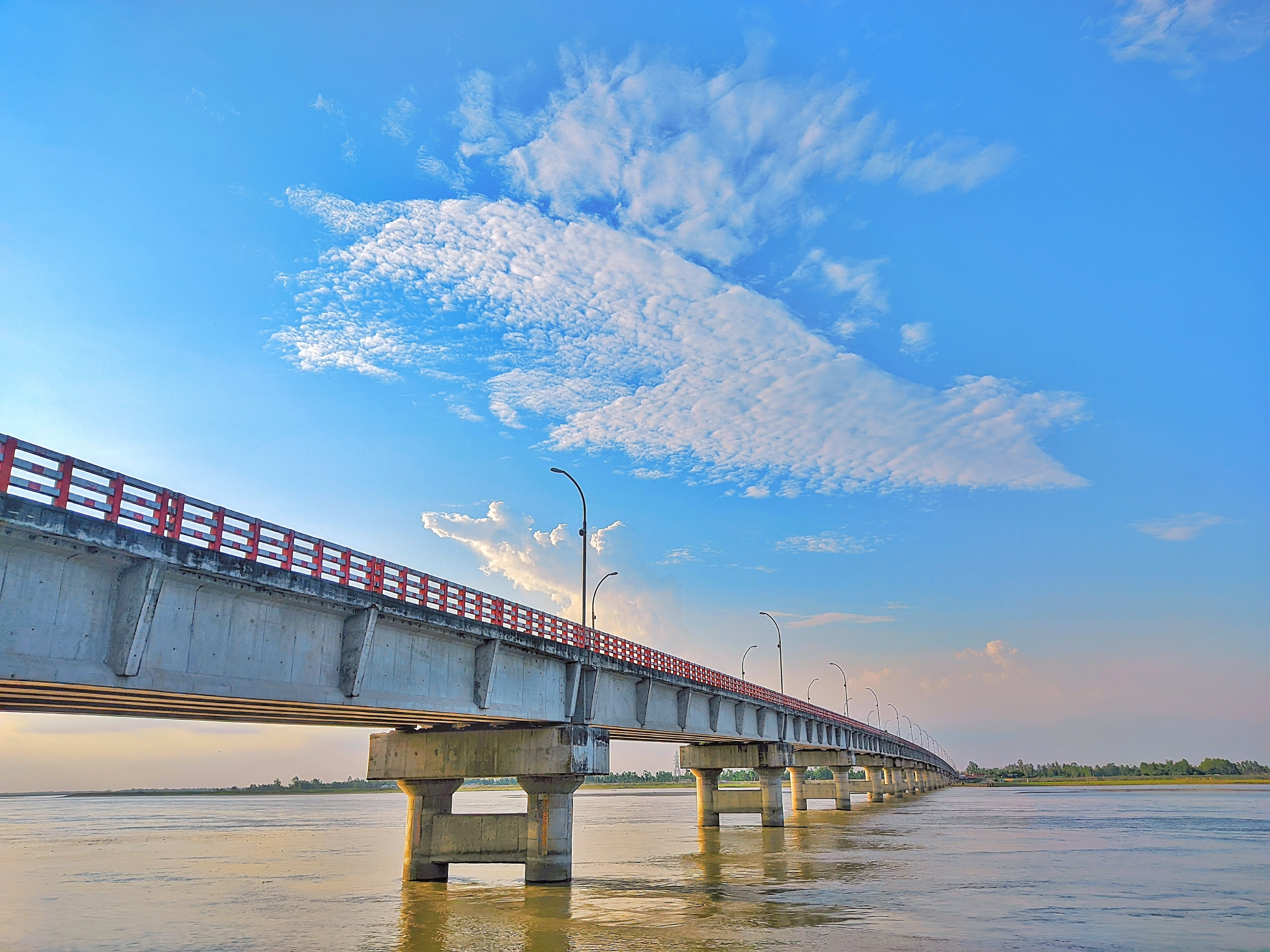
- Bridge over the Teesta

- Coordinates: 25°51′N 89°13′E
- Country: Bangladesh
- Division: Rangpur
- District: Rangpur

Government
  - Upazila Chairman: Alhaj Ruhul Amin
  - MP (Rangpur-1): Md. Asaduzzaman Bablu

Area
  - Total: 269.67 km^{2} (104.12 sq mi)

Population (2022)
  - Total: 286,730
  - Density: 1,063.3/km^{2} (2,753.8/sq mi)
- Time zone: UTC+6 (BST)
- Postal code: 5410
- Website: gangachara.rangpur.gov.bd(in Bengali)

Gangachara Upazila mauza geocode map

Gangachara (Bengali: গংগাচড়া, romanized: Gongachora) is the northernmost upazila of Bangladesh's Rangpur District, located in the Rangpur Division.

== Etymology ==
There are several legends relating to the etymology of Gangachara. It is said that this area was all a large river (gang in the Bengali language) in the past from north to south along the west side of this area. Later, a river island (chor) formed within the river, which led to the term Gangchor gaining currency, which was later corrupted to Gangachara.

It is said that this former river was known by locals as kaligonga or puran gonga. According to legend, a trader named Chand Saudagar used to bring a fleet of 14 dinghies to trade in this area. But the river could not accommodate such a large fleet of dinghies. Yet he made a lot of money. So the next year the merchant came into the trade again with a relatively small dinghy fleet. He came and saw that the river was much wider this time than last year. However, the merchant did not see much profit that year, instead having to count the losses. So the merchant came again the next year with 14 dinghies to recover the loss. This time the opposite happened again. The river has become thinner again than last year. But this year too he managed to make a lot of money. The following year, he again brought more dinghies into the wide river and had to count the losses again in his trade. Chand Saudagar cursed the river for this embarrassing situation by saying that "this deception you are doing to me, let it be the reason for your destruction. A time will come in which people will settle in your bosom, on that day you will become a dead river". After giving this curse, Chand Saudagar no longer came to trade in this area and eventually the river dried up and human settlements began to form. The area then became known as Gangachara. The place where Chand Saudagar used to tie his dinghies is still known as "Dingarpar" to this day, located in Kolkond. There was a tree there called the "Tree of Achina" which supposedly preserved evidence of Saudagar's dinghies up until 2011. There is a famous local saying among the locals of Gangachara:

যদি উঠে মংলার ঢেউ, কান্দিয়া উঠে চাঁদ সওদাগরের বউ
jôdi uṭhe mônglar ḍheu, kandiya uṭhe chand saodagôrer bou
If the waves of the river rise, Chand Saudagar's wife begins to cry

== Geography ==
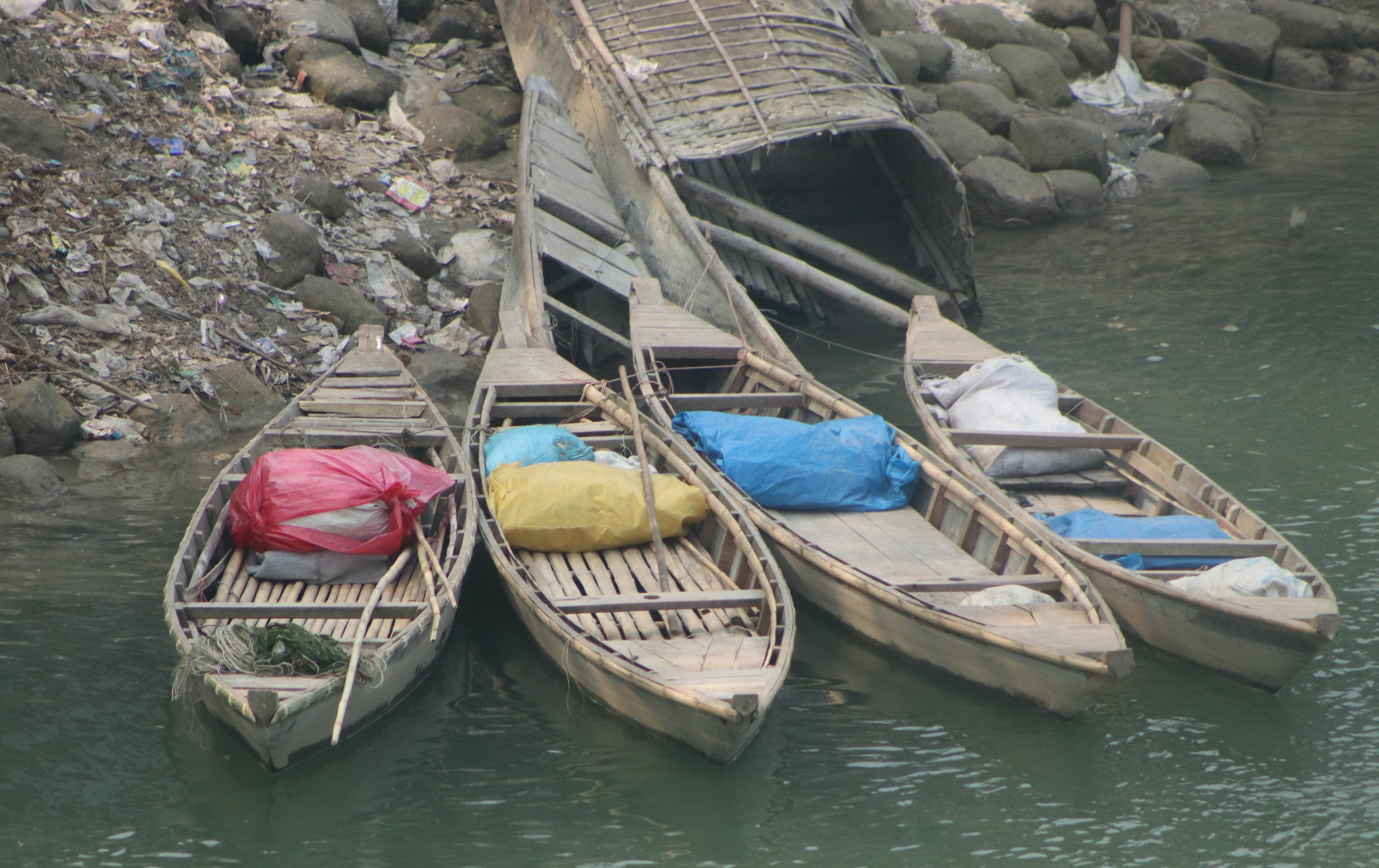
Four boats floating in Teesta river, near Teesta Gangachara Bridge

Gangachara is located at 25.8500°N 89.2167°E. It has 73,463 households and total area 269.67 km^{2}. The area is highly prone to river erosions, which has played a part in the loss of many historical architecture. As the northernmost upazila of Rangpur District, it is bounded by the upazilas of Taraganj, Rangpur Sadar and Kaunia to its southwest, south and southeast respectively. To its east lies the Aditmari Upazila of Lalmonirhat District and to its west is Kishoreganj Upazila of Nilphamari District.

== History ==
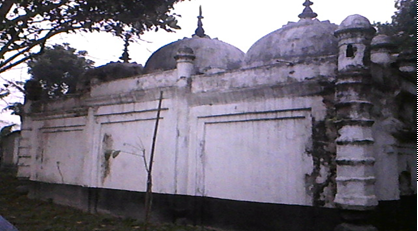
The historic Pakhi Mosque in Mandrain, Lakkhitari Union

Like much of the Rangpur region, Gangachara has a strong Mughal heritage and this attested by its historic mosques in Coleconda, Barabil and Mandrain. Sharif Pir Saheb, a Sufi pir, is buried at Pakuria. The area was also home to Rangpur's only major zamindar family, whose presence dates back to the eleventh century. The village of Narsingha was renamed to Mahipur in honour of the Pala emperor Mahipala around this time. The family maintained respective authority and feudal aristocracy in Gangachara for several centuries, with Arif Muhammad Choudhury becoming the military commander-in-chief for the Cooch Behar State. Gangachara later passed on to the hands of the Mughal Empire in 1711, with Choudhury officially becoming the first Zamindar of Mahipur which extended across Qazirhat, Mahipur, Tushbhandar, Tepa and Dimla. A fourth of the Mahipur Estate went underwater due to a change in the Teesta River's course in 1787. Many people became landless as a consequence.

In 1917, the British Raj established a thana (police outpost administrative headquarters) in Gangachara. Another Teesta River course change happened again in 1964, affecting not only Mahipur but also Gajaghanta and Marania. The settlements in Gangachara also suffered from the floods and river erosions of 1968, 1971 and 1974.

During the Bangladesh Liberation War of 1971, a Pakistan Army soldier is noted to have chased a young girl and her father in Gangachara in the middle of August until they were forced to jump in the river, where they subsequently died by drowning. Two months later, two soldiers along with five Razakars died whilst fighting members of the Mujib Bahini. Later on, the army launched attack on worshippers at the Taltala Mosque, killing seventeen Muslims entering the mosque. On 13 December, Gangachara was liberated and 212 Razakars surrendered at the Gangachara police station. Gangachara Thana was upgraded to an upazila (sub-district) in January 1984 as part of the President of Bangladesh Hussain Muhammad Ershad's decentralisation programme. The president inaugurated the Gangachara Criminal Court on 18 March that year. In 2011, Gangachara was declared a Model Thana. In 1992, the unions of Alambiditar and Nohali in Kishoreganj Upazila were transferred to Gangachara.

== Demographics ==
Religions in Gangachara Upazila (2022)
Religion	Percent
Islam	89.62%
Hinduism	10.37%
Other or not stated	0.01%

According to the 2022 Bangladeshi census, Gangachara Upazila had 73,969 households and a population of 286,730. 9.88% of the population were under 5 years of age. Gangachara had a literacy rate (age 7 and over) of 66.66%: 69.66% for males and 63.73% for females, and a sex ratio of 98.35 males for every 100 females. 51,812 (18.07%) lived in urban areas.

According to the 2011 Census of Bangladesh, Gangachara Upazila had 73,463 households and a population of 297,869. 73,691 (24.74%) were under 10 years of age. Gangachara had a literacy rate (age 7 and over) of 43.17%, compared to the national average of 51.8%, and a sex ratio of 982 females per 1000 males. 12,345 (4.14%) lived in urban areas.

As of the 1991 Bangladesh census, Gangachara has a population of 259856. Males constitute 52.06% of the population, and females 47.94%. This Upazila's eighteen up population is 94,048. Gangachara has an average literacy rate of 22.4% (7+ years), and the national average of 32.95% literate.

== Economy ==
As a region of the river Teesta, a lot of paddy was grown here. However, excavations in some areas have yielded pottery. Excavations at Moubhasha Lakherajtari and Dhamur School have revealed pottery. At present there is a tari called Kumartari in South Panapukur since ancient times. When the Dingarpar area of Kolkond was excavated, cloth could be found.

== Administration ==
UNO: Nahid Tamanna.

Gangachara Upazila is divided into nine union parishads: Alam Biditar, Barabil, Betgari, Gangachara, Gajaghanta, Kolkanda, Lakkhitari, Marania, and Nohali. The union parishads are subdivided into 92 mauzas and 128 villages.

== Notable people ==
- Aftab Ahmed, photojournalist and Ekushey Padak recipient
- Mohammad Owais, former member of the National Assembly of Pakistan
- Moyenuddin Sarker, former member of the Jatiya Sangsad
- Zamindars of Mahipur, ancient aristocratic dynasty of feudal lords in Gangachara
  - Khan Bahadur Abdul Majid Chowdhury (1860–1912), educationist

== See also ==
- Upazilas of Bangladesh
- Districts of Bangladesh
- Divisions of Bangladesh
