= Rangpur Zilla School =

Coordinates: 25.7574°N 89.2429°E

- রংপুর জিলা স্কুল

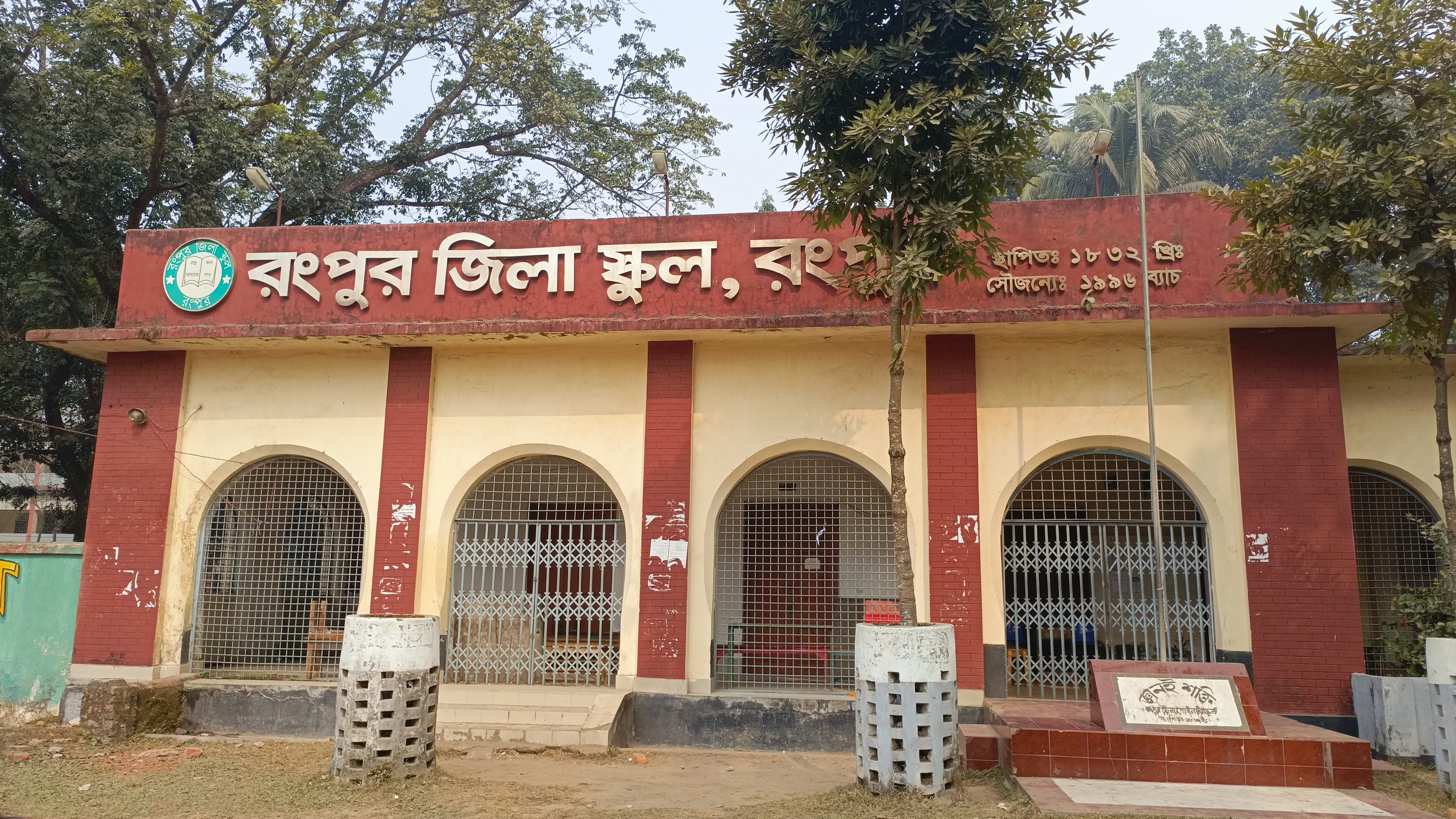
- Rangpur Zilla School

Location
- Kachari Bazar Road; Rangpur District; Rangpur; Bangladesh

Information
- School type: Government School
- Motto: প্রভু আমাকে জ্ঞান দাও; Lord grant me wisdom
- Established: 1832; 194 years ago
- School board: Board of Intermediate and Secondary Education, Dinajpur
- Session: January–December
- Principal: Abul Kalam Azad (2024 – present)
- Staff: 10
- Teaching staff: 53
- Grades: 3–10
- Gender: Male only
- Age: 7 to 17
- Enrollment: 1800
- Language: Bengali
- Campus: Rangpur 5400
- Campus size: 15.66 acres
- Sports: Football, Cricket, Basketball, Volleyball, Badminton
- Alumni: Prafulla Chaki, anti-British revolutionary, Anisul Hoque, playwright, poet, novelist, journalist
- EIIN: 127372
- Special project: Connecting classrooms under British Council
- Website: www.rangpurzillaschool.edu.bd

Rangpur Zilla School (Bengali: রংপুর জিলা স্কুল) is a government school for boys located in Rangpur, Bangladesh. Established in 1832, it is one of the oldest schools in the country and holds historical significance as one of the first educational institutions founded in undivided Bengal.

== History ==
The origins of Rangpur Zilla School can be traced to 1832, when it was founded as Rangpur Zamindar School by the collective efforts of local landlords, or zamindars, of the region. The initiative was strongly supported by the then-district collector, Nathial Smith, who was an official of the British East India Company. The institution was officially inaugurated by Lord William Bentinck, who was serving as the Governor-General of Bengal at the time. The school's early development was further supported by a significant donation from the Maharaja of Cooch Behar, which funded the construction of its first building. Krishna Nath Ray was appointed as the school's inaugural headmaster.

In 1857, the school was brought under the direct management of the Government of India and subsequently became affiliated with the University of Calcutta. It was officially renamed Rangpur Zilla School in 1862. The school's infrastructure saw a period of significant expansion and development between 1870 and 1874, enhancing its facilities to accommodate a growing student body.

== Campus and facilities ==
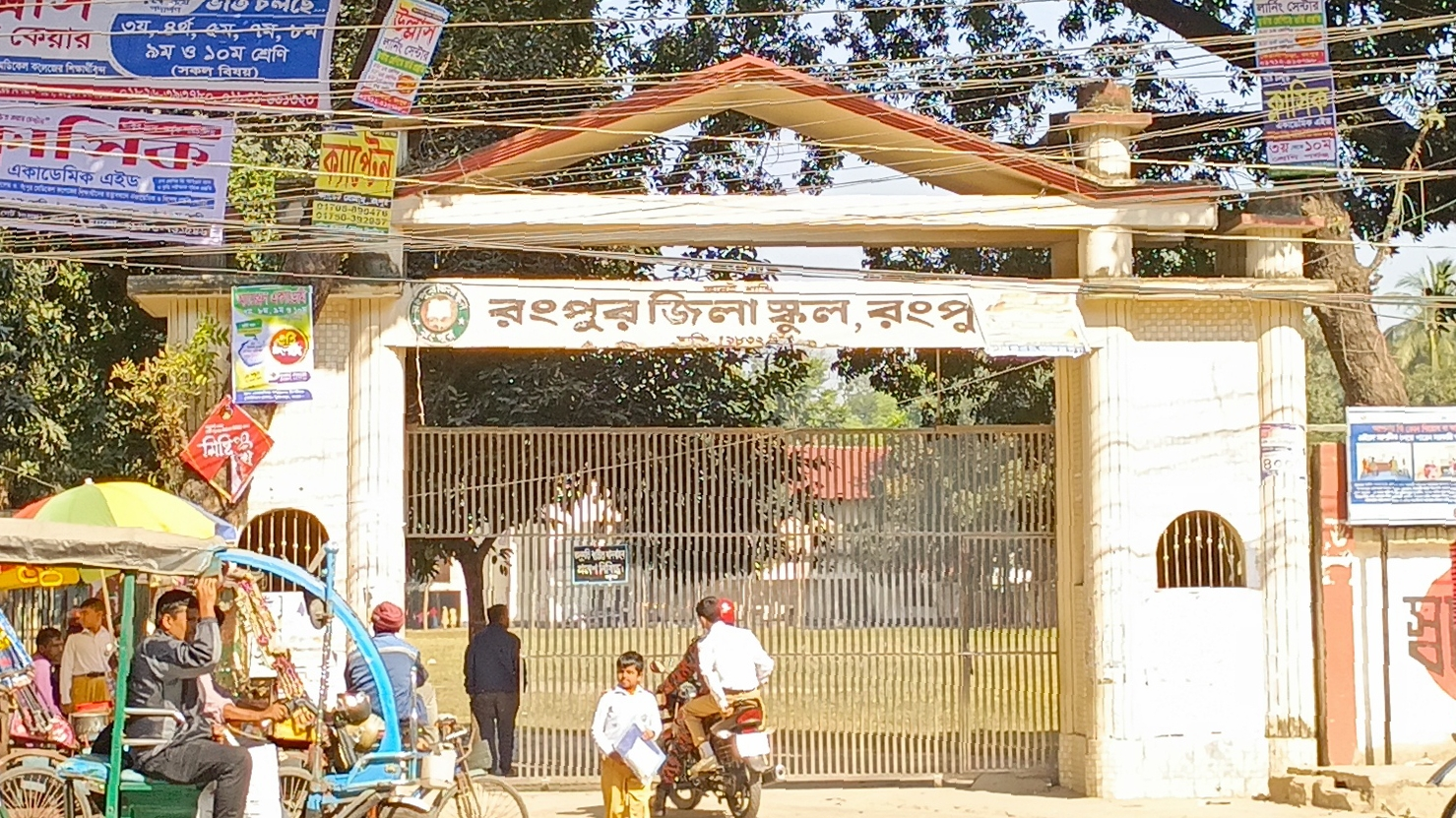
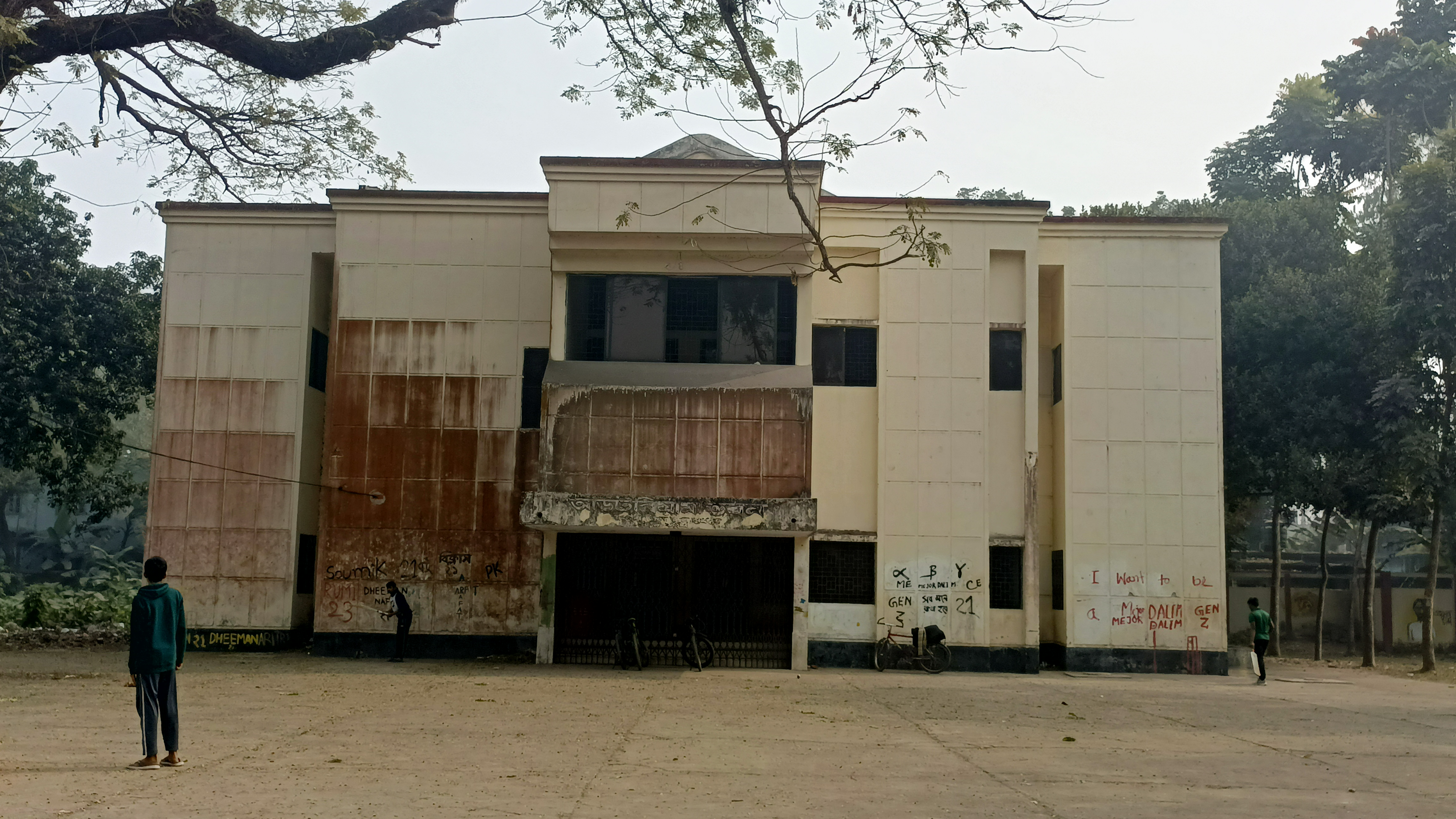
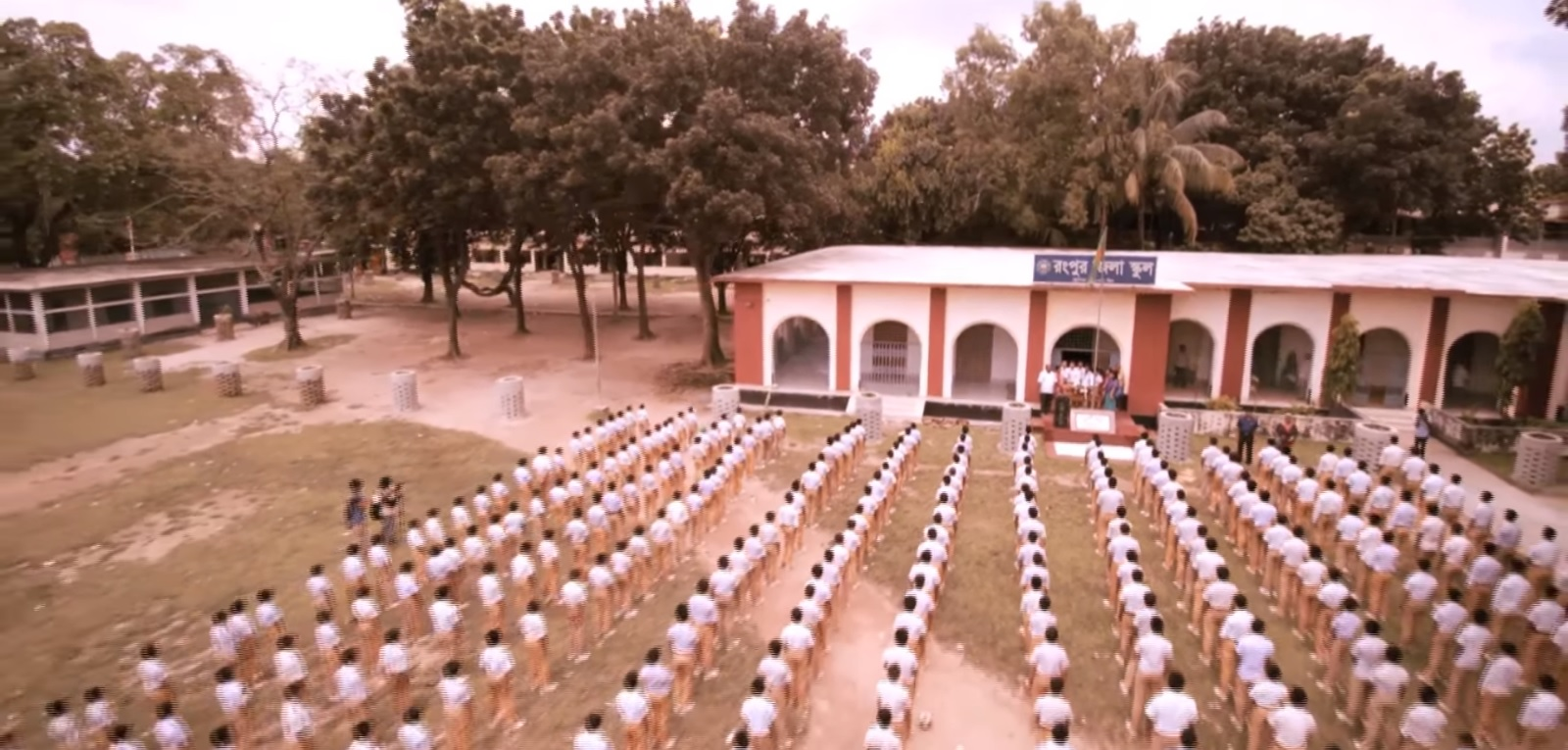
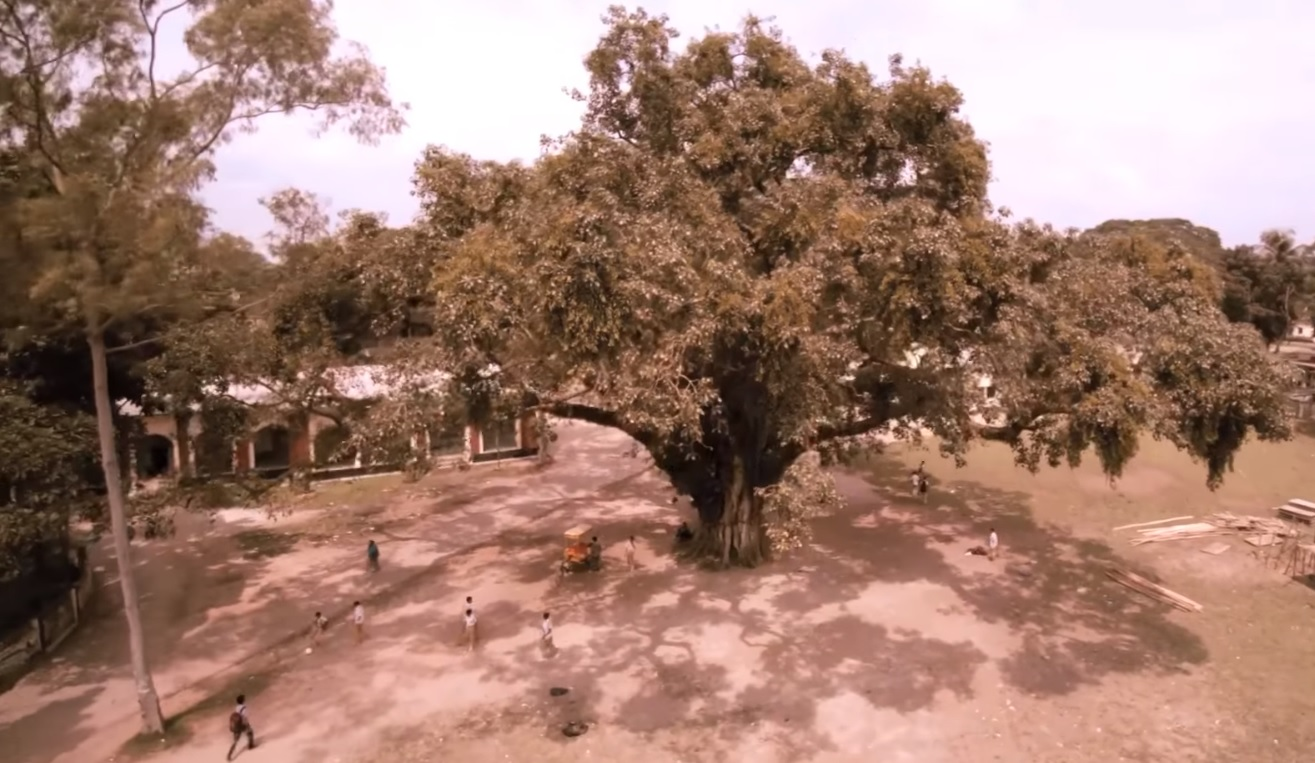

The campus of Rangpur Zilla School covers an area of 15.66 acres (approximately 6.34 hectares). The school grounds contain a total of seven buildings. The academic facilities are primarily located in a three-story, I-shaped building. The campus also includes dedicated facilities such as two multimedia classrooms, two ICT labs, and five science laboratories. Additionally, it houses a library and an auditorium.

The grounds feature a large field used for sports and other outdoor activities, with a pond situated in the back area. The campus is secured by a perimeter wall and also includes hostel facilities for students.

== Academics ==
The syllabus follows the rules of the Board of Intermediate and Secondary Education, Dinajpur. The medium of instruction is Bengali.

The school's academic program follows the curriculum prescribed by the Board of Intermediate and Secondary Education, Dinajpur, with the medium of instruction being Bangla. To accommodate its student body of approximately 2,032 students, the school operates in two shifts—a morning shift and a day shift. Both shifts offer classes from the third to the tenth grade.

== Notable alumni ==
- Khan Bahadur Abdul Majid Chowdhury (1860–1912), educationist
- M. Atiqur Rahman, political analyst, writer
- Prafulla Chaki, anti-British revolutionary
- Anisul Hoque, playwright, poet, novelist, journalist
- M. A. Wazed Miah, physicist

== See also ==
- List of Zilla Schools of Bangladesh
