= Mostafizur Rahman Mostafa =

Bangladeshi politician

- মোস্তাফিজুর রহমান মোস্তফা
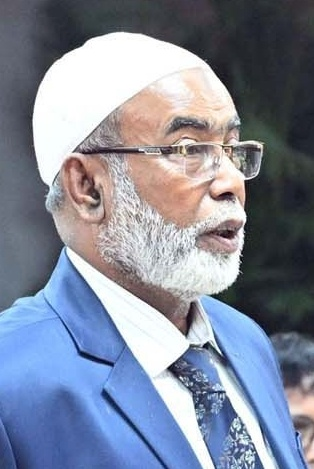
- Mostafa in 2023

2nd Mayor of Rangpur
- In office 21 December 2017 – 19 August 2024
- Preceded by: Sharfuddin Ahmed Jhantu
- Succeeded by: Md. Zakir Hossain (as Administrator)

Personal details
- Born: Rangpur, East Pakistan
- Party: Jatiya Party (Ershad)
- Spouse: Jelly Rahman
- Children: Trina; Zarin
- Education: Carmichael College
- Occupation: Politician, Teacher

Mostafizur Rahman Mostafa is a Bangladeshi politician, he was the mayor of Rangpur. He was elected as mayor of the Rangpur City Corporation in 2017 city election by defeating Awami League candidate and then sitting mayor Sharfuddin Ahmed Jhantu. He is the president of the Jatiyo Party Rangpur city unit and also a presidium member of Jatiyo Party (Ershad). Earlier, he also served as Rangpur Jatiya Party (JP) general secretary.

== Early life and education ==
Mostafa completed his BSC from Carmichael College, Rangpur. He started his career as a school teacher.

== Career ==
Before contesting the mayoral election in 2012 as an independent candidate he served as upazila chairman since 2009. In the 2012 mayoral election he got 78,600 votes. In 2017 2nd Rangpur city corporation election he gained ticket from party chairman H M Ershad. In the election, Mostafizar Rahman Mostafa won 160,489 votes with party polls logo 'plough' whereas his nearest rival the Awami League's Sharfuddin Ahmed Jhantu, the outgoing mayor who ran with 'boat' logo, got 62,400 votes. In RpCC elections- 2022, he was re-elected with 146,798 votes.

== Personal life ==
Mostafa is married to Jelly Rahman.He has two daughters named Trina Rahman and Zarin Tasnim Rahman.
