= 1896 New Year Honours =

Appointments by Queen Victoria

The 1896 New Year Honours were appointments by Queen Victoria to various orders and honours to reward and highlight good works by members of the British Empire. They were published on 1 January 1896.

The recipients of honours are displayed here as they were styled before their new honour, and arranged by honour, with classes (Knight, Knight Grand Cross, etc.) and then divisions (Military, Civil, etc.) as appropriate.

== Order of the Star of India ==
=== Knight Grand Commander (GCSI) ===
- (Extra) The Right Honourable Beilby, Lord Wenlock, GCIE, Governor of the Presidency of Madras

=== Knights Commander (KCSI) ===
- Lieutenant-General Sir Henry Brackenbury, RA, KCB, Member of the Council of the Governor-General of India.
- Mansinghji Sarsinghji Thakore Saheb of Palitana

=== Companions (CSI) ===
- Major-General Montagu Gilbert Gerard, CB, Indian Staff Corps.
- Lieutenant-Colonel David William Keith Barr, Agent to the Governor-General in Central India.
- Denzil Charles Jelf Ibbetson, Esq, Indian Civil Service.
- James John Digges La Touche, Esq, Indian Civil Service.
- Arthur Upton Fanshawe, Esq, Indian Civil Service.

== Order of the Indian Empire ==
=== Knights Grand Commander (GCIE) ===
- Sir Alfred Comyn Lyall, KCB, KCIE, Member of the Council of India

=== Knights Commander (KCIE) ===
- Nawab Secundar Jung Ikbal-ud Dowlah, Iktadarul-Mulk, Vikar-ul-Umara, Bahadur, Prime Minister to His Highness the Nizam of Hyderabad.
- Major-General Thomas Dennehy, Bengal Army (Retired), CIE (Extra)

=== Companions (CIE) ===
- James Grose, Esq, Member of the Council of the Governor of Madras.
- Patrick Playfair, Esq, Additional Member of the Governor-General's Legislative Council.
- Rana Dhalip Singh, Chief of Baghat.
- Frederick John Johnstone, Esq, Secretary, and Chief Engineer, Public Works Department, Government of Bengal.
- Colonel Richmond Irvine Crawford, Indian Staff Corps.
- Charles Falkiner MacCartie, Esq, Indian Civil Service.
- Richard Morris Dane, Esq, Indian Civil Service.
- Surgeon-Lieutenant-Colonel Samuel Haslett Browne, MD, Indian Medical Service.
- Rash Behary Ghose, MA
- Waman Abaji Modak, BA
- Frank Henry Cook, Esq

== Order of St Michael and St George ==
=== Knights Commander (KCMG) ===
- The Honourable Philip Oakley Fysh, Treasurer and formerly Premier of the Colony of Tasmania.
- William Crofton Twynam, Esq, CMG, on retirement, after fifty years service, from the office of Government Agent for the Northern Province of the Island of Ceylon.

=== Companions (CMG) ===
- Captain the Honourable Assheton Gore Curzon Howe, RN, CB, for special services rendered while engaged in the protection of the Newfoundland Fisheries.
- Lieutenant-Colonel and Brevet Colonel William Hillier Holborow, commanding the 3rd Regiment of Infantry of the Colony of New South Wales.
- Captain Raleigh Grey, on relinquishing the Appointment of Lieutenant-Colonel Commandant of the British Bechuanaland Border Police.
- Captain John Irvine Lang, RE, for services in connection with the Railway Survey and the delimitation of the Western Boundary of the Gold Coast Colony.
- William Valentine Robinson, Esq, Clerk of ihe Legislative Assembly of the Colony of Victoria.
- Henry Alfred Alford Nicholls, Esq, MD, Medical Officer of Public Institutions of the Island of Dominica.
