= Sharfuddin Ahmed Jhantu =

Bangladeshi politician

- শরফুদ্দিন আহমেদ ঝন্টু

1st Mayor of Rangpur
- In office 28 June 2012 – 20 December 2017
- Preceded by: Position established
- Succeeded by: Mostafizur Rahman Mostafa

Member of Parliament
- In office 14 July 1996 – 13 July 2001
- Preceded by: Karimuddin Bharsa
- Succeeded by: Mashiur Rahaman Ranga
- Constituency: Rangpur-1

Personal details
- Born: 1952 Rangpur, East Pakistan
- Died: 25 February 2018 (aged 66) Dhaka, Bangladesh
- Party: Bangladesh Awami League

Sharfuddin Ahmed Jhantu (1952 – 25 February 2018) was a Bangladesh Awami League politician and a former Jatiya Sangsad member who represented Rangpur-1 constituency. He also served as the first mayor of the Rangpur City Corporation during 2012–2017.

== Career ==
Jhantu was elected to parliament from Rangpur-1 as a Jatiya Party candidate in 1996. He served as the Chairman of Rangpur Sadar Upazila and Rangpur Municipality. He was elected the first Mayor of Rangpur City in 2012. He again contested the 2017 mayoral election as an Awami League candidate but lost to the Jatiya Party candidate Mostafizur Rahman Mostafa.

== Death ==
Jhantu died on 25 Feb 2018 in Labaid Hospital, Dhaka, Bangladesh.
