= Hossain Mokbul Shahriar =

Bangladeshi politician

- হোসেন মকবুল শাহরিয়ার

Member of Parliament for Rangpur-1
- In office 25 January 2009 – 24 January 2014
- Preceded by: Moshiur Rahman Ranga
- Succeeded by: Moshiur Rahman Ranga

Personal details
- Born: 18 June 1974 (age 51)
- Party: Jatiya Party (Ershad)
- Parent: Mozammel Hossain Lalu (father)
- Relatives: HM Ershad, GM Quader (uncles) Saad Ershad (cousin)

Hossain Mokbul Shahriar (Bengali: হোসেন মকবুল শাহরিয়ার) is a Jatiya Party (Ershad) politician and a Jatiya Sangsad member from the Rangpur-1 constituency. He is the nephew of Hussain Mohammad Ershad, a former president of Bangladesh.

== Early life and family ==
Shahriar was born on 18 July 1974 to a Bengali Muslim family in Rangpur, Bangladesh. His father, Mozammel Hossain Lalu, has roots in Dinhata in present-day India. His paternal grandfather, Maqbul Hossain, was a lawyer and served as a minister of the erstwhile Maharaja of Cooch Behar.

== Career ==
Shahriar was elected to parliament from Rangpur-1 as a Jatiya Party candidate in 2008. In January 2012, he and his men vandalized Rangpur Medical College Hospital and threatened the hospital director. He wanted the hospital to recruit his men for vacancies at the hospital. A case was filed against Shahriar with Rangpur Police Station over the clash.

In 2017, Shahriar was expelled from Jatiya Party by Ershad for contesting Rangpur City mayoral election as an independent candidate against the official candidate of Jatiya Party. He ran as an independent candidate in the Rangpur-3 by-election and lost to his cousin Saad Ershad.
