= Hosne Ara Lutfa Dalia =

Bangladeshi politician

Member of Parliament
- In office 19 March 2014 – 28 January 2019

Personal details
- Born: 1 January 1963 (age 63) Rangpur City, Rangpur District, East Pakistan, Pakistan
- Party: Bangladesh Awami League

Hosne Ara Lutfa Dalia (born 1 January 1963) is Bangladesh Awami League politician and former Member of Parliament.

== Biography ==
Dalia was born on 1 January 1963 in Rangpur City, Rangpur District, East Pakistan, Pakistan. She completed her studies in law, finishing school with an LLB degree and start her law practise. On 1 January 2006 she presided over a conference titled Combating Violence against Women. The conference was held by Padakhep, a non-government organisation based in Rangpur, in Rangpur Chamber of Commerce and Industry auditorium.

Dalia previously served as the President of Rangpur Nattya Chakra, a cultural organisation which promotes theatre and other cultural activities. She was nominated on 8 March 2014 by Bangladesh Awami League to the Parliament through the reserved seats for women. She was elected on 19 March 2014 as one of forty-eight females Members of Parliament elected unopposed. She is a Member of the treasury bench of the parliament.

Dalia has spoken for the rights of Dalits and spoken for the passage of the draft on Elimination of discrimination act-2015 through the Bangladesh Parliament. She is a Member of the Parliamentary Caucus on Children Rights.

In December 2022, Dalia was nominated by Awami League to contest the mayoral election of Rangpur. She lost the election and her security deposit for not securing the minimum number of votes for the constituency.
