= Khondakar =

Bengali Muslim surname

Khandakar
- Pronunciation: Khandakar
- Language: Bengali

Origin
- Origin: Persian
- Meaning: Teacher, scribe
- Region of origin: Bengal

Other names
- Alternative spelling: Khondoker, Khondker, Khandaker, Khandoker, Khondaker, Khandoker, Khundkar, Khandker

Khandakar (Bengali: খন্দকার, romanized: Khondokar, Also spelled Khondoker, Khandaker, Khandoker) is a Bengali Muslim surname.

== Etymology and history ==
The Bengali surname comes from the Old Persian Khandan (Persian: خواندن, romanized: Xwândan, lit. 'To read') and the suffix kar (Persian: کار, romanized: Kâr) which joins the root of the verb to mean the one who reads Persian: خوانده‌کار, romanized: Xwândakâr. The Bengali definition of the word is an instructor or teacher. The usage of Persian as an official language in Bengal was common during the rule of the Bengal Sultanate and the Mughal Empire. The Persians as well as members of the Turco-Persian tradition were a large immigrant community during both periods in which they integrated with the local Bengali community. Many Persians in Bengal became teachers, lawyers, scholars and clerics. These Persians merged with Bengalis to become Bengali Muslims.

== Variations ==
Variations of the surname Khandakar also remain very common. These include different English transliterations and regional pronunciations of the term. Different English spellings include: Khondker, Khandaker, Khondoker, Khondokar, Khondaker, Khondkar, Khondakar, Khandker, and Khandoker.

== Individuals ==
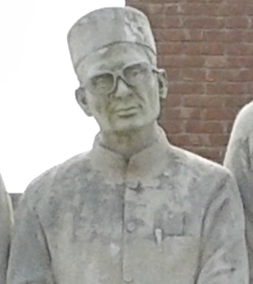
Khondaker Mostaq Ahmad

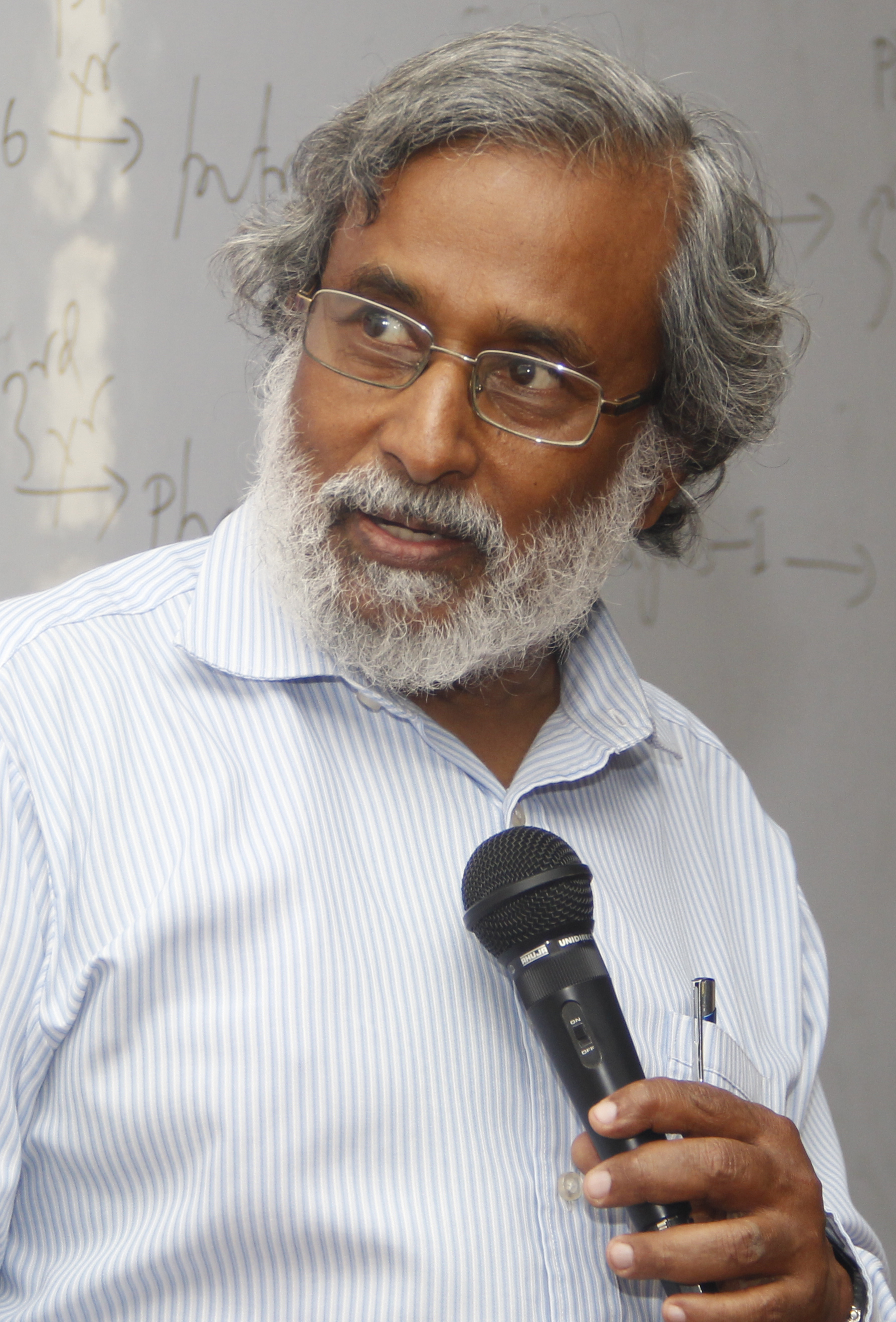
Khondkar Siddique-e-Rabbani

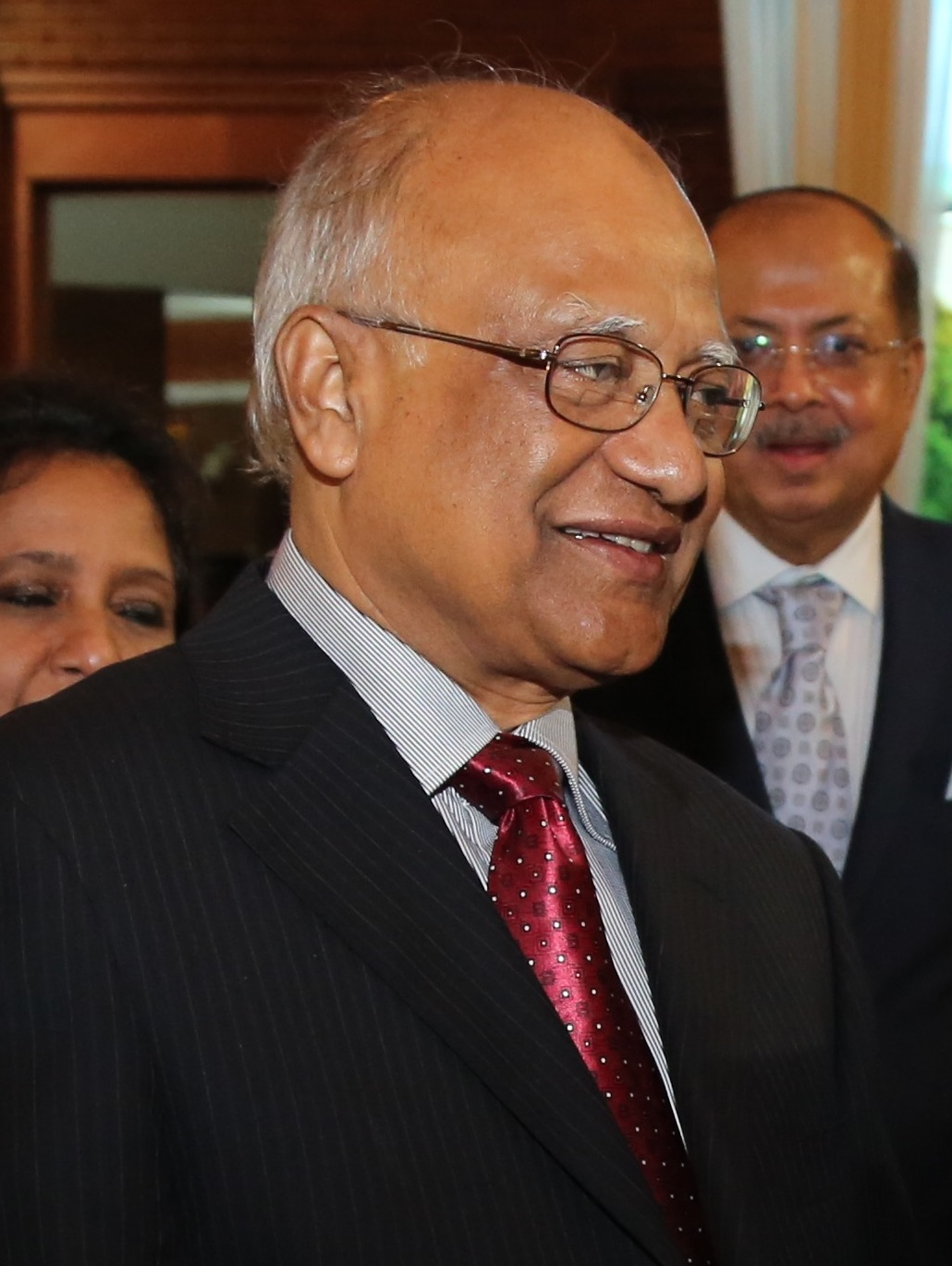
Khandaker Mosharraf Hossain

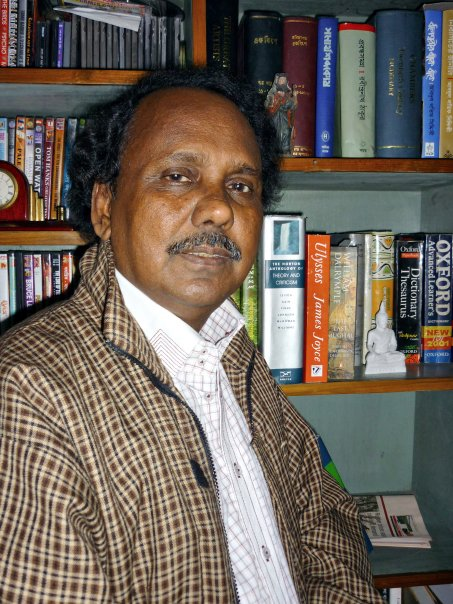
Khondakar Ashraf Hossain

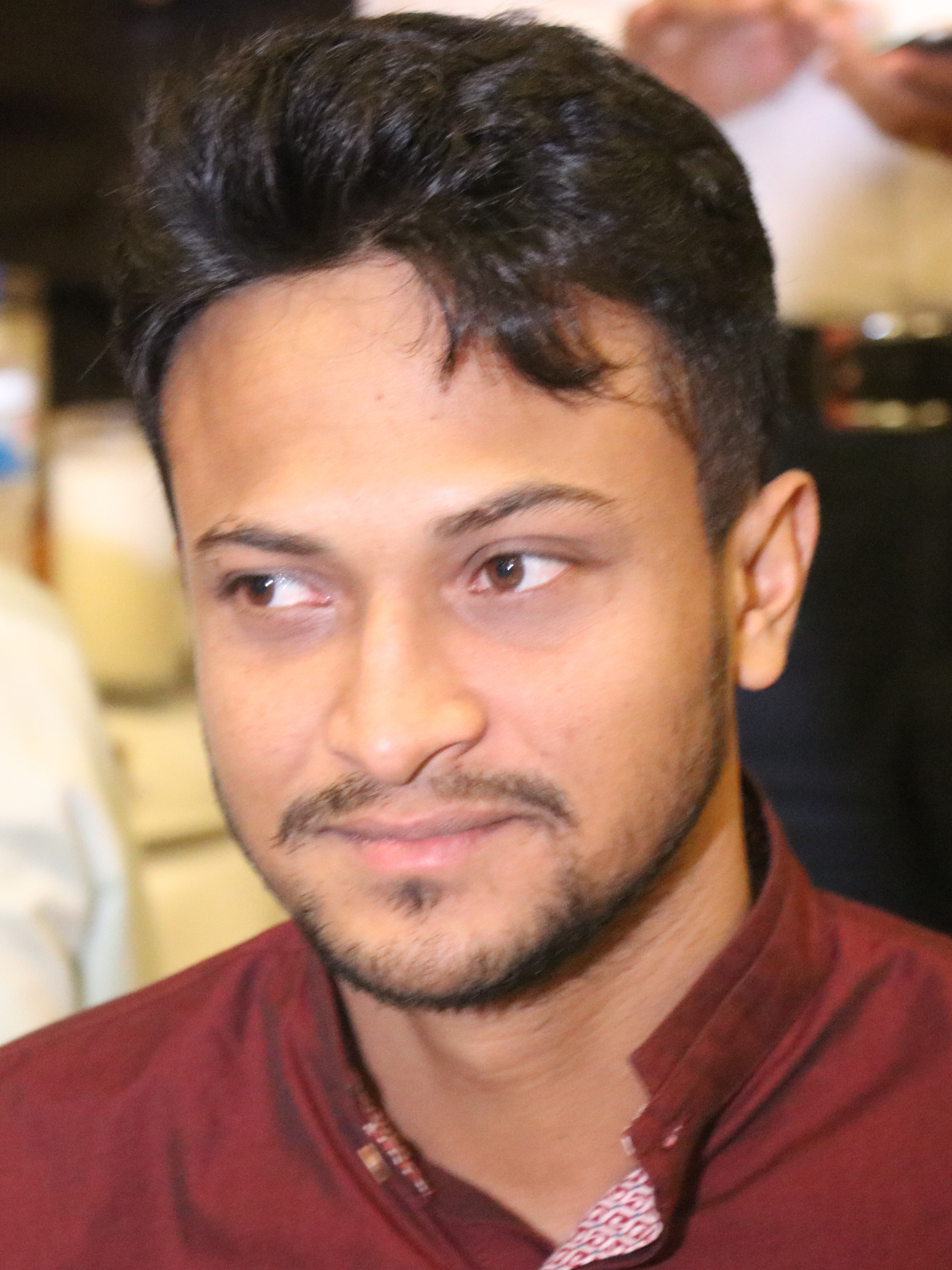
Khondakar Shakib Al Hasan

- Syed Ismail Hossain Khandaker Siraji (1880–1931), poet, author and practitioner of medicine
- Khandakar Abdur Rashid Tarkabagish (1900–1986), former president of the Awami League
- Khondakar Abdul Hamid (1918–1983), journalist and editor of The Azad
- Khondaker Mostaq Ahmad (1919–1996), former President of Bangladesh
- Khandaker Abdul Malik (1920–2007), former MP for Sylhet-1
- Khondakar Abu Taleb (1921–1971), chief reporter of The Daily Ittefaq
- Mokarram Hussain Khundker (1922–1972), scientist and educationist
- Abdul Aziz Khandaker (1923–1991), former MP for Patuakhali-6
- Khandakar Muhammad Illyas (1923–1995), socialist
- Khondakar Ghulam Mustafa (1928–2010), Bangladeshi journalist and diplomat
- Khandaker Abdul Hafeez (1930–2001), former MP for Jessore-13
- Abdul Karim Khandker (born 1930), first Chief of Air Staff
- Abdur Raquib Khandaker (1933–2010), 8th Inspector General of Bangladesh Police
- Khandakar Abdul Malek Shahidullah (1936–2021), former MPA and language activist
- Khandaker Mahbub Hossain (1938–2022), President of Bangladesh Supreme Court Bar Association
- Khondokar Mahmud Hasan (born 1939), 13th Chief Justice of Bangladesh
- Khondkar Ibrahim Khaled (1941–2021), former Deputy Governor of Bangladesh Bank
- Khondakar Abul Kashem (1944–1971), historian and academic
- Khandaker Rashiduzzaman Dudu (1944–2014), former president of the Federation of Bangladesh Chambers of Commerce & Industries
- Khandoker Mohammad Nurunnabi (1946–2016), major general and retired footballer
- Khandaker Abdul Baten (1946–2019), former MP for Tangail-6
- Khandaker Shahiduddin Firoz (1946–2020), actor
- Khondakar Ashraf Hossain (1950–2013), writer and poet
- Akbar Ali Khondkar (1957–2005), President of Hooghly District Trinamool Congress
- Khandaker Golam Mostafa (1943–2020), journalist and former MP
- Khandaker Abdur Rashid (born 1946), Bangladesh Army officer
- Khandaker Mosharraf Hossain (born 1946), former Minister of Energy and Mineral Resources
- Khandakar Mofizur Rahman (1948–2018), former MP for Kishoreganj-6
- Khondkar Siddique-e-Rabbani (born 1950), biomedical physicist
- Khandakar Mohammad Khurram (1953–2018), former MP for Sherpur-3
- Khandaker Anwarul Haque (born 1956), former MP for Tangail-1
- Khandaker Rakibul Islam (born 1956), footballer
- Khandakar Azizul Huq Arzu (born 1958), former MP for Pabna-2
- Badol Khondokar (born 1960), film producer
- Khandker Anwarul Islam (born 1960), 22nd Cabinet Secretary of Bangladesh
- Khandoker Wasim Iqbal (born 1961), footballer
- Khandaker Abdullah Jahangir (1961–2016), Islamic scholar, academic and author
- Khandkar Mohammad Adil Hussain (born 1963), Bollywood actor
- Khandker Golam Faruq (born 1964), 34th Police Commissioner of Dhaka Metropolitan Police
- Khandakar Sayed Mohammad Mostafizur Rahman (born 1964), industrialist, economist and agriculturalist
- Abdul Batin Khandakar (born 1968), MLA for Abhayapuri North
- Golam Faruk Khandakar Prince (born 1969), MP for Pabna-5
- Khandaker Diliruzzaman (born 1973), High Court justice
- Khondaker Mosharraf Hossain Rubel (1981–2022), Bangladeshi cricket player
- Khondakar Mohammad Rezaul Haque (born 1982), cricketer
- Khandaker Muhammad Asad (born 1983), documentary photographer and photojournalist
- Tushar Khandker (born 1985), field hockey player and coach
- Khondaker Shakib Al Hasan (born 1987), one of the greatest all rounder cricketers of all time
- Khandaker Abdul Jalil, former MP for Shariatpur-2
- Khandaker Abdul Mannan, former MP for Comilla-6
- Khandaker Al Moin, Bangladesh Navy Commander
- Khandaker Amirul Islam, former MP for Mymensingh-6
- Golam Akbar Khandaker, former MP for Chittagong-6
- Khondakar Harun-ur-Rashid, former MP for Dhaka-1
- Hassan Mahmood Khandker, longest serving Inspector General of Police (Bangladesh)
- Khondaker Hasibul Kabir, landscape architect and sustainability advocate
- Humayun Kabir Khandaker, civil servant and philosopher
- Khondker M. Talha, ambassador to France
- Khondkar Misbah-ul-Azim, Bangladesh Navy admiral
- Khandaker Nasirul Islam, former MP for Faridpur-1
- Khondaker Nurjahan Yesmin Bulbul, former MP
- Obaidul Huq Khandaker, former MP for Chittagong-1
- Khandakar Oliuzzaman Alam, former MP for Joypurhat-1
- Rahima Khandaker, former MP
- Rezaul Alam Khandaker, former MP for Rangpur-18
- Khandaker Sadrul Amin Habib, former MP for Rajbari-2
- Shahid Khandaker, former MP for Dhaka-1
- Khandaker Asaduzzaman, former MP for Tangail-2
- Suja Khondokar, actor and airlines official
- M. H. Khandaker, first Attorney General of Bangladesh

== Families ==
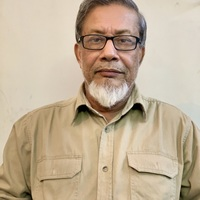
Khondkar Maudood Elahi (1945 - 2025)

- Khondker-Elahi family of Rangpur
  - Khondkar Maudood Elahi (1945 - 2025), Bangladeshi professor and businessman
  - Khondkar Mukhtar Elahi (1949 - 1971), Bangladeshi freedom fighter
  - Khondkar Taufiq Elahi (born 1977), Bangladeshi architect and academic
  - Khondkar Mushtaq Elahi (born 1948), Bangladeshi-American freedom fighter, philanthropist, and scholar
  - Khondkar Manzoor Elahi, Bangladeshi freedom fighter
  - Khondkar Tausif Elahi (born 2013), Bangladeshi youngest Astronomy Olympiad champion, Mathematics Olympiad champion, Physics Olympiad champion, Biology Olympiad first runner-up, and Junior Science Olympiad national winner
  - Khondkar Iffat Elahi Mahbub, Bangladeshi murder victim whose murder caused a large procession
  - Khondkar Mahbub Elahi Biplob, Bangladeshi murderer
  - Khondkar Daad Elahi, Bangladeshi school principal, school inspector and politician
  - Khondkar Lutful Elahi, Bangladeshi historian, academic, and professor
  - Khondker Modarresh Elahi - Bangladeshi former assistant attorney general

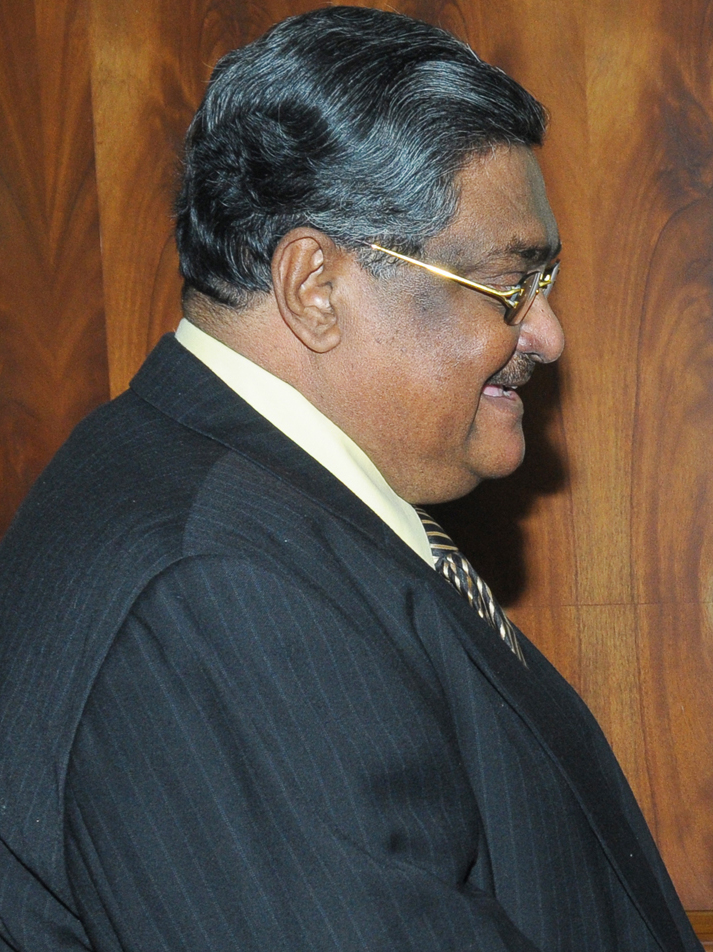
Khandaker Mosharraf Hossain

- Khandaker family of Faridpur
  - Khandaker Nurul Islam (died 2001), first MP of Faridpur-2
  - Khandaker Mosharraf Hossain (born 1942), former Minister of Labour
- Khondkar family of Kodalia, Faridpur
  - Khondkar Nazmul Huda (1938–1975), army colonel
  - Naheed Ezaher Khondkar, member of parliament
- Khandaker family of Naruchi, Tangail
  - Khandaker Asaduzzaman (1935–2020), first finance secretary of Bangladesh
  - Khandaker Aparajita Haque (born 1964), member of parliament
- Khandkar family of Pachuria, Manikganj
  - Khandaker Delwar Hossain (1933–2011), 5th Chief Whip of Parliament
  - Khandkar Manwar Hossain (1930–1999), founder of the Department of Statistics in Rajshahi University
- Khandakar family of Salar, Murshidabad
  - Khandakar Fazle Rabbi (1848-1917), Dewan of the Nawab of Murshidabad
  - Khandakar Rehman Sobhan (born 1935), economist
  - Khandakar Farooq Sobhan (born 1940), former diplomat and foreign secretary of Bangladesh
  - Khandakar Zafar Sobhan (born 1970), lawyer, journalist and political analyst
- Khandokar family of Gopinathpur, Gopalganj
  - Khandokar Shams Uddin Ahmed (1892–1981), lawyer and member of the Bengal Legislative Assembly
  - Khandokar Mahbub Uddin Ahmad (1925–2014), MP for Dhaka-9

== Institutions ==
- Khondoker Abdul Majid High School, Ullahpara, Sirajganj
- Government Khandakar Musharraf Hussain College, Jhenaidah

== See also ==
- Sheikh (Bangladeshi Surname)
- Bengali Kazi
- Sayyid
- Akhand (surname)
