= Khondaker Hasibul Kabir =

Bangladeshi landscape architect

Hasibul Hasan
- Education: Bangladesh University of Engineering and Technology
- Occupation: Architect

Khondaker Hasibul Kabir is a Bangladeshi landscape architect and sustainability advocate who works with Bangladeshi development agencies such as BRAC and Grameen in rural and sustainable architecture. He first proposed "The Platform of Hope" (Ashar Macha) in 2007 when he moved personally in with family in the slums and designed a community space. It was showcased in the Cooper–Hewitt, National Design Museum in New York City. He also worked with German Architect Anna Heringer on the METI Handmade School in Rudrapur, Bangladesh which received the Aga Khan Award for Architecture in 2007.

== Education ==
Kabir graduated with a Bachelor of Architecture degree in 2000 from the Bangladesh University of Engineering and Technology in Dhaka, Bangladesh, and later attended the University of Sheffield in the U.K. where he was awarded a Master of Architecture degree in 2005, where he researched "Homestead plant-communities in the floodplains of Bangladesh for their potential uses in landscape". He also attended the Lund University in Sweden and also Costa Rica for "Small scale organized self-help housing" in 2003. He joined BRAC University in 2005 as a lecturer of Architecture.

== Design ==
Kabir used a local carpenter and a bamboo worker to build a platform extending over Gulshan Lake, and connected it to the garden with a bridge. The "Platform of Hope", measures 18 by 36 feet serves as an open area where local children in the slums of Dhaka can gather to play. It is also equipped with a small library. The slum which is home to 120,000 people, is the largest slum in Dhaka, the capital of Bangladesh. Located at the city's center, it is boxed in by a growing rich neighborhood and a lake, and increased population density has led to a decrease in open land. Dhaka, according to UNEP, will be the second largest city in the world by 2015.
