= Obel Award =

Architecture prize

The Obel Award
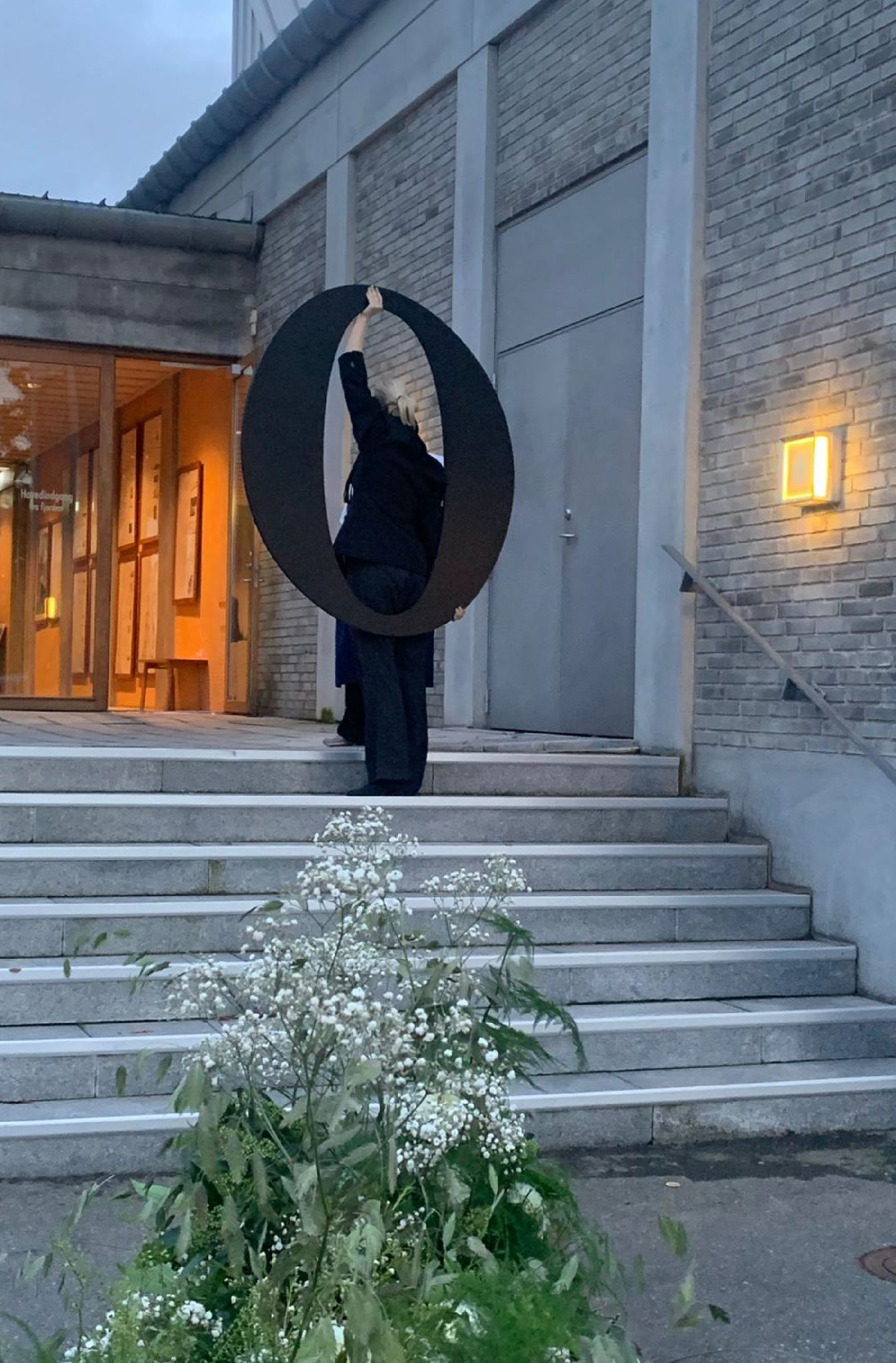
- Country: Denmark
- Reward: €100,000
- First award: 2019 -
- Website: www.obelaward.org

The OBEL Award is an international architecture award presented annually for "recent and outstanding architectural contributions for the common good."

The award carries a prize of €100,000 and emphasizes ecology and transdisciplinary approaches. From 2019 to 2023, the award included a trophy designed by Argentine artist Tomás Saraceno.

The award is administered by OBEL, a foundation established by Danish businessman Henrik Frode Obel (1942–2014) and based in Copenhagen, Denmark. Obel founded the organization to fund and recognize architectural work, directing his fortune toward this purpose.

OBEL's activities extend beyond the annual award to include teaching fellowships, travel grants, publications, exhibitions, and lectures, with a stated focus on architecture's role in addressing global challenges.

== Laureates ==
| Year | Laureate(s) | Country | Winning project | Award focus | Ceremony | Ref. |
|---|---|---|---|---|---|---|
| 2019 | Jun'ya Ishigami | Japan | Water Garden | Well-being | The Utzon Center, Aalborg, Denmark | |
| 2020 | Anna Heringer | Germany | Anandaloy | Mending | Due to covid, there was no ceremony this year. | |
| 2021 | Carlos Moreno | Colombia/France | The 15-minute City | Cities | The Hôtel de Ville of Paris, France | |
| 2022 | Seratech | United Kingdom | Seratech, Technology | Emissions | The Utzon Center, Aalborg, Denmark | |
| 2023 | Kate Orff | United States | Living Breakwaters | Adaptation | Sydney Opera House, Sydney, Australia. | |
| 2024 | Colectivo C733 | Mexico | 36 x 36 | Architectures with... | The Utzon Center, Aalborg, Denmark | |
| 2025 | HouseEurope! | EU | Power to Renovation | Ready Made | Brussels, Belgium | |
| 2026 | The Balearic Social Housing Model | EU | The Balearic Social Housing Model | Systems Hack | The Utzon Center, Aalborg, Denmark | |

=== 2026: Systems Hack ===
Winner: The Balearic Social Housing Model, A systemic approach to public housing developed in the Balearic Islands, Spain, between 2019 and 2023. A model not based on one particular material, architectural language or construction technique but a system in which procurement, architecture, materials, energy, tenure, public capacity and learning were interconnected responses to real social, environmental and economic challenges.

=== 2025: Ready Made ===
Winner: Power to Renovation by HouseEurope!, a policy lab and citizen-led initiative advocating for a socially and ecologically responsible transformation of the construction industry by pushing for systemic change in EU policy. In doing so, HouseEurope! needs one million signatures across all EU member states until January 31, 2026, to bring the topic to the courts of the European Parliament.

=== 2024: Architectures With... ===
Winner: 36 x 36 by Colectivo C733 Colectivo C733 is composed of the offices of architects Gabriela Carrillo (Taller Gabriela Carrillo), Carlos Facio and José Amozurrutia TO, along with Eric Valdez (Labg) and Israel Espin. They came together as a meta-architectural collective to design and deliver the projects under complex social, political, environmental, and financial constraints.

=== 2023: Adaption ===
Winner: Living breakwaters by Kate Orff Scape

Living Breakwaters, the 2023 Obel Award winning project, is a half mile linear necklace of near-shore breakwaters along the south shore of Staten Island in New York. A mix of stones and carefully designed ecologically enhanced concrete units are placed strategically to calm the water, reduce erosion, and rebuild onshore beaches, but also to support oysters, fin fish, and other marine species. The oysters will form part of the design of the artificial reef formation. As they reproduce, the breakwaters grow denser and able to provide more protection of the shore.

Beyond the breakwaters, the project has involved nearly a decade of educational and engagement-related programming designed to advance community stewardship, citizen science, and recreation along the water’s edge.

The Living Breakwaters concept was developed by a large, multi-disciplinary team led by Scape as part of a winning proposal for Rebuild By Design, the design competition launched by the United States Department of Housing and Urban Development after Superstorm Sandy.

=== 2022: Emissions ===
Winner: Seratech by Sam Draper and Barney Shanks

The 2022 winning project is a technology developed by PhD students at Imperial College London, Sam Draper and Barney Shanks, who have found a way to produce carbon-neutral concrete.

The team, which consists of material scientists and engineers, has developed an efficient, low-cost process to capture CO_{2} emissions directly from industrial flues. The process captures and stores all the CO_{2} through a chemical process, which also yields a cement additive – a silica – that can replace the amount of Portland cement in the concrete mix by up to 40%. The carbon capture associated with producing the silica means the concrete products can be zero carbon.

The raw materials used in Seratech’s process – waste CO_{2} and a magnesium silicate mineral – are naturally abundant all over the globe. Furthermore, the process integrates into existing manufacturing lines and the equipment used in concrete production. As such, it is possible to implement in every cement plant around the world and does not require major shifts in current practices or mindsets.

Given the huge carbon footprint of the construction industry, Seratech’s process has the potential to significantly reduce embodied emissions globally and to support future low-carbon construction.

Seratech is currently developing the design of a pilot plant to model the process at large scale.

=== 2021: Cities ===
Winner: The 15-minute city by Carlos Moreno

The idea behind the 15-minute city is that cities should be (re)designed, so that all residents are able to access their daily needs (housing, work, food, health, education, and culture and leisure) within the distance of a 15-minute walk or bike ride.

The model has been adopted by several cities around the world, most notably in Paris where mayor Anne Hidalgo collaborated with Carlos Moreno and made it part of her re-election campaign in 2020. In 2020, C40 Cities promoted the 15-minute city idea as a blueprint for post-COVID-19 recovery.

=== 2020: Mending ===
Winner: Anandaloy by Anna Heringer

The winning project of 2020 is an unconventional, multifunctional building that hosts a therapy centre for people with disabilities on the ground floor and a textile studio on the top floor producing fair fashion and art.

The building is called Anandaloy, which means The Place of Deep Joy in the local dialect of Bangla/Bengali. Surrounded by green paddy fields in northern Bangladesh stands a curving building in two storeys built out of mud and bamboo. The mud walls curve, and a big ramp winds up to the first floor. Below the ramp are caves.

=== 2019: Well Being ===
Winner: Water garden by Jun'ya Ishigami

The winning project of 2019 is an outdoor extension of the existing Art Biotop Nasu, a resort that offers courses in pottery, glass making, and other artistic activities at the foot of Mount Nasu in Tochigi, a prefecture north of Tokyo.

Earlier, the site was a paddy field; earlier still, a forest overgrown with moss. Traces of the site’s history remains, such as a sluice gate to draw water.

The site of the new hotel was a forest, where many trees would be cut down due to construction. Because the total area of the forest site and that of the meadow site were nearly the same, Junya Ishigami proposed to relocate the entire forest to the adjacent meadow. Through this act, the meadow site is transformed not only by moving the forest, but also by superimposing all the layers from past environments in the site’s history: the landscape of the paddy field and the landscape of the mossy forest are overlapped as one. Trees from the adjacent forest are rearranged on the site, and water is drawn in from the existing sluice gate to fill countless ponds, all connected to the existing irrigation system with water flowing continuously at different rates. The ponds and trees spread across the entire site at a close density never found within nature, with moss laid out beautifully to fill the spaces in between.

== Current jury members ==
- Nathalie de Vries, chair. Architect and urbanist, principal and co-founder of MVRDV, Rotterdam, Netherlands.
- Aric Chen, juror. Design curator and Artistic Director of Rotterdam's Het Nieuwe Instituut, b. in USA.
- Sumayya Vally, juror. Architect, founder and director of Counterspace, Johannesburg, South Africa, and London, UK.
- Anne Marie Galmstrup juror. Architect, founder and director of Galmstrup Architects, London, UK.

== Past jury members ==
- 2019-2023 Martha Schwartz, chair. Landscape architect, urbanist, and artist, USA.
- 2020-2025 Xu Tiantian, juror. Architect, founding principal, DnA, Beijing, China.
- 2019-2024 Kjetil Trædal Thorsen, juror, chair 2023-24. Architect, co-founder and design principal of Snöhetta Architects, Norway.
- 2019-2023 Louis Becker, juror and board member. Architect and design principal of Henning Larsen Architects, Denmark.
- 2019-2023 Wilhelm Vossenkuhl, juror. Professor (em.) and philosopher. Germany.

== OBEL Teaching Fellowships ==
The aim of the OBEL Teaching Fellowships is to bring the professional and academic realms closer together by enhancing the debate and learnings of the award theme chosen within that year.

The Fellowships support the teaching of a new course or courses within an official program at an accredited academic institution. Illustrating the goal of bringing new voices into academia, thus showing dedication to and support of the objectives of OBEL.

In its first edition in 2023, OBEL received applications from 19 different countries. The winners of the first cycle will teach at the International University of East Africa in Uganda, Yaba College of Technology in Nigeria, Pontificia Universidad Católica de Chile in Latin America, and at the College of Science and Technology (Bhutan).
