= KSM Mostafizur Rahman =

Bangladeshi entrepreneur

- Born: October 31, 1964 (age 61); Pakulla, Bogra District, East Pakistan
- Occupations: Industrialist; entrepreneur; economist; agriculturalist; philanthropist
- Notable work: Founding National Agricare Group and One Pharma Limited; Contributions to Agricultural and Pharmaceutical Sectors in Bangladesh

KSM Mostafizur Rahman (Bengali: কেএসএম মোস্তাফিজুর রহমান; born October 31, 1964) is a Bangladeshi industrialist, entrepreneur, economist, agriculturist and philanthropist. KSM Mostafizur Rahman is a pioneer in the field of agricultural manufacturing in Bangladesh such as agrochemicals, pesticides, plant growth regulators, hybread rice seed, vegetable seed etc. and has been recognized as a commercially important person (CIP) of Bangladesh in 2013 for his significant impact on the nation's economic development. In 2014, Mostafizur Rahman was honored with the President's Industrial Development Award for his contributions to the industrial sector of Bangladesh.

Mostafizur Rahman is currently managing director of the National AgriCare Group of Bangladesh and founder of One Pharma Limited. In 2021, he was awarded Guinness World Record for creating the world's largest crop field mosaic in Bogra, Bangladesh. Since 2023, Mostafizur Rahman has also served as the founder president of the Bangladesh Agrochemical Manufacturers Association (BAMA).

== Early life ==
Khandakar Syed Mohammad Mostafizur Rahman was born on 31 October 1964 to a respected Bengali Muslim Syed family of Khandakars in the village of Pakulla in Sariakandi Thana (now under Sonatala Upazila) of Bogra District, East Pakistan (now Bangladesh). He was the son of the late Syed Zaman Khandakar and Syeda Momena Begum. Mostafizur Rahman demonstrated exceptional intelligence, cultural interests, and a passion for sports from an early age. He completed his secondary education at Pakulla Multilateral High School and his higher secondary education with distinction from Bogra Government Azizul Haque College.

In 1983, Mostafizur Rahman enrolled at Bangladesh Agricultural Institute – formerly part of Bangladesh Agricultural University, and is now known as Sher-e-Bangla Agricultural University, Dhaka – where he graduated in 1986. He furthered his education by completing a Group Diploma in Management (Correspondence) from the College of Professional Management in Jersey, United Kingdom in 1995, followed by a Master of Business Administration degree from Asian University of Bangladesh in 2002.

== Career ==
Mostafizur Rahman founded National Agricare Group, which established in 2002; since its inception, the organization has ascended to one of the leading position of importer and manufacturer of pesticides, micronutrients and growth regulators in Bangladesh. In October 2015, under Mostafizur Rahman's leadership, National AgriCare Group ventured into pharmaceutical industry with the establishment of One Pharma Ltd; Health Minister Mohammed Nasim was coming to inaugurate the event. One Pharma is specializing in anti-ulcerant, antibiotic, antidiabetic, antiemetics, antihypertensive, lipid lowering, neuropathic, urinary alkalinizers and anti-asthmatic products, with the regulated manufacturing facility is based at northern Bogra. The company has established manufacturing facility for biotech and anticancer products, including vaccines and a variety of biological therapeutics such as cancer, rheumatoid arthritis, chronic respiratory diseases, CNS disorders and cardiovascular diseases. At the same plant along with human health products, the company has the facilities to produce animal health products. Additionally, Mostafizur Rahman's expert team of pharmacists in another dedicated facility of One Pharma offers animal health products. Specializing in foot-and-mouth vaccines, One Pharma helps preventing and controlling this significant livestock ailment, with products that aim to improve animal health, supporting vetenary care and animal husbandry.

In addition to leadership roles at National AgriCare Group and One Pharma Ltd, Mostafizur Rahman has expanded his efforts into diversified sectors through entities such as One Information and Communications Technology Ltd – which collaborates with the government of Bangladesh to address various IT-related challenges in Bangladesh – and One Seed Ltd, China Gardencity Developers Ltd, as well as the non-profit organization Sayed Momena Montaj Foundation. Additionally, Mostafizur Rahman is a recognized contributor to English-language publications in Bangladesh, with various articles focusing on the pharmaceutical, agriculture, GDP, national productivity industry and Bangladesh's economic landscape have been published in The Daily Observer and Daily Sun.

=== Memberships ===
Mostafizur Rahman maintains active memberships in various professional organizations. In December 2021 Mostafizur Rahman was elected president of the Greater Bogra Association in Dhaka for 2022–2023. In 2023, Mostafizur Rahman was elected as the President of Bangladesh Agrochemical Manufacturers Association (BAMA) for the 2023–2024 term. He is also an executive member of Drug Control Committee (DCC) in the Directorate General of Drug Administration (DGDA), Ministry of Health and Family Welfare of Bangladesh. The following is a list of Mostafizur Rahman's memberships:

- Member, Executive Committee, Bangladesh Association of Pharmaceutical Industries (BAPI)
- Member, Drug Control Committee (DCC)
- General Body Member, Federation of Bangladesh Chambers of Commerce and Industry (FBCCI)
- Member, FBCCI Standing Committee on Agriculture, Agro Processing and Agro Based Industries
- Ex-President, Greater Bogra Society, Dhaka
- President, Bangladesh Agrochemical Manufacturers Association (BAMA)
- Member, Executive Committee, Bangladesh Seed Association (BSA)
- Member, Bangladesh Garments Accessories & Packaging Manufacturers & Exporters Association (BGAPMEA)
- Member, Army Golf Club, Dhaka
- Lifetime Member, Krishibid Institution of Bangladesh
- Member, Dhaka Club Ltd.
- Member, Dhanmondi Club Ltd.

=== Accolades ===
Mostafizur Rahman's contributions to agriculture and the economy have been recognized with several prestigious awards, including being named a Commercially Important Person (CIP) in 2013, and the President's Award for Industrial Development in 2014. Internationally, he received the Global Entrepreneur Award in 2019. Mostafizur Rahman's leadership has also led to the formation of the Bangladesh Agrochemicals Manufacturers Association (BAMA), further solidifying his impact on the agricultural sector.

In March 2021 Mostafizur Rahman, in collaboration with National AgriCare, achieved a Guinness World Record for creating the world's largest crop field mosaic using golden and deep purple rice plants – in Balenda village, Bogra, Bangladesh. He also served as the Member Secretary and Chief Spokesperson of the National Committee on Crop Portrait for this project.

| Year | Awards | Sources |
|---|---|---|
| 2013 | Commercially Important Person (CIP) | |
| 2014 | President's Industrial Development Award | |
| 2019 | Global Entrepreneur Award | |
| 2021 | Guinness World Record | |

== Activism ==
Mostafizur Rahman also founded a non-profit organization Sayed Momena Montaj Foundation in 2016 – named in honor of Mostafizur Rahman's mother – which is dedicated for societal welfare. These include establishing school, colleges, providing scholarships to underprivileged and meritorious students from middle school to PhD students. His foundation's initiatives have significantly contributed to the fields of education, health, and sports in Bangladesh. Mostafizur Rahman has played a vital role in promoting industrial and commercial development in Bangladesh, with efforts to advance the economic and social welfare of the country.

== Personal life ==
Mostafizur Rahman is married to Nazmun Nahar, who holds the position of chairman at the National AgriCare Group. They have two children: a daughter, Rahman Abanti Hemica, and a son, Yalid Bin Rahman, who both contribute to the family business as board of Directors. The family resides in Dhaka.
