= Anna Heringer =

German architect

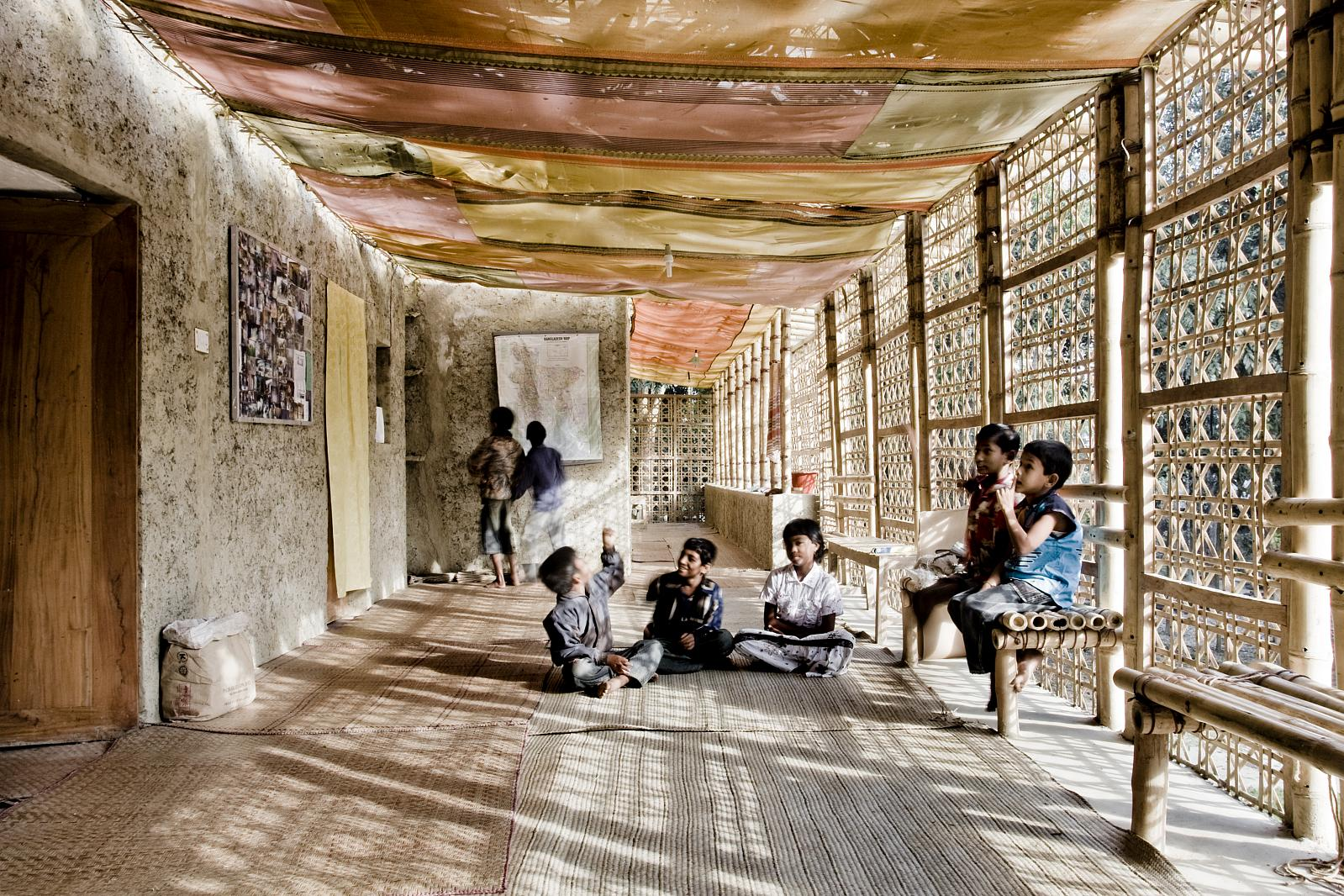
Anna Heringer: DESI Vocational School, Rudrapur (completed 2006)

Anna Heringer (born 13 October 1977 in Rosenheim) is an architect known for her approach to sustainable architecture, particularly in the realm of earthen construction. Her work is characterized by the use of local materials and techniques, as well as a commitment to community engagement and empowerment. Heringer has worked on projects in Bangladesh, Morocco and Austria, which have garnered international recognition for their appearance, functionality, and sustainability, most notably the METI Handmade School in Rudrapur, Bangladesh.

== Biography ==
Heringer grew up in Laufen, Bavaria, in Southern Germany. She studied architecture at the University of Arts and Industrial Design in Linz, Austria, graduating in 2004. Her interest in Bangladesh began in 1997, when she spent a year carrying out voluntary work for the NGO Dipshikha, where she learned about sustainable development work. She has since visited the country at least once a year.

After assisting with fundraising, she went on to implement ideas from her diploma thesis at Rudrapur in the Dinajpur district of Bangladesh. Under the official name METI Handmade School, the project was carried out with the assistance of members of the local community. They made use of mud and bamboo, the traditional building materials of the area. The school was completed in 2006 for the NGO Dipshikha. Heringer's other projects include the nearby DESI (Dipshikha Electrical Skill Improvement), a vocational training school for electricians, completed in 2008, and the Training Centre for Sustainability in Marrakesh, Morocco, built in 2010. Since 2004, Heringer has worked as a lecturer and consultant. She now lives in Salzburg, Austria.

Anna Heringer's work has been shown at Museum of Modern Art in New York, la Loge in Brussels, Cité d`architecture and du patrimoine in Paris, the São Paulo Museum of Modern Art, the Aedes Gallery in Berlin, and at the 2010 Venice Biennale of Architecture.

== Projects ==
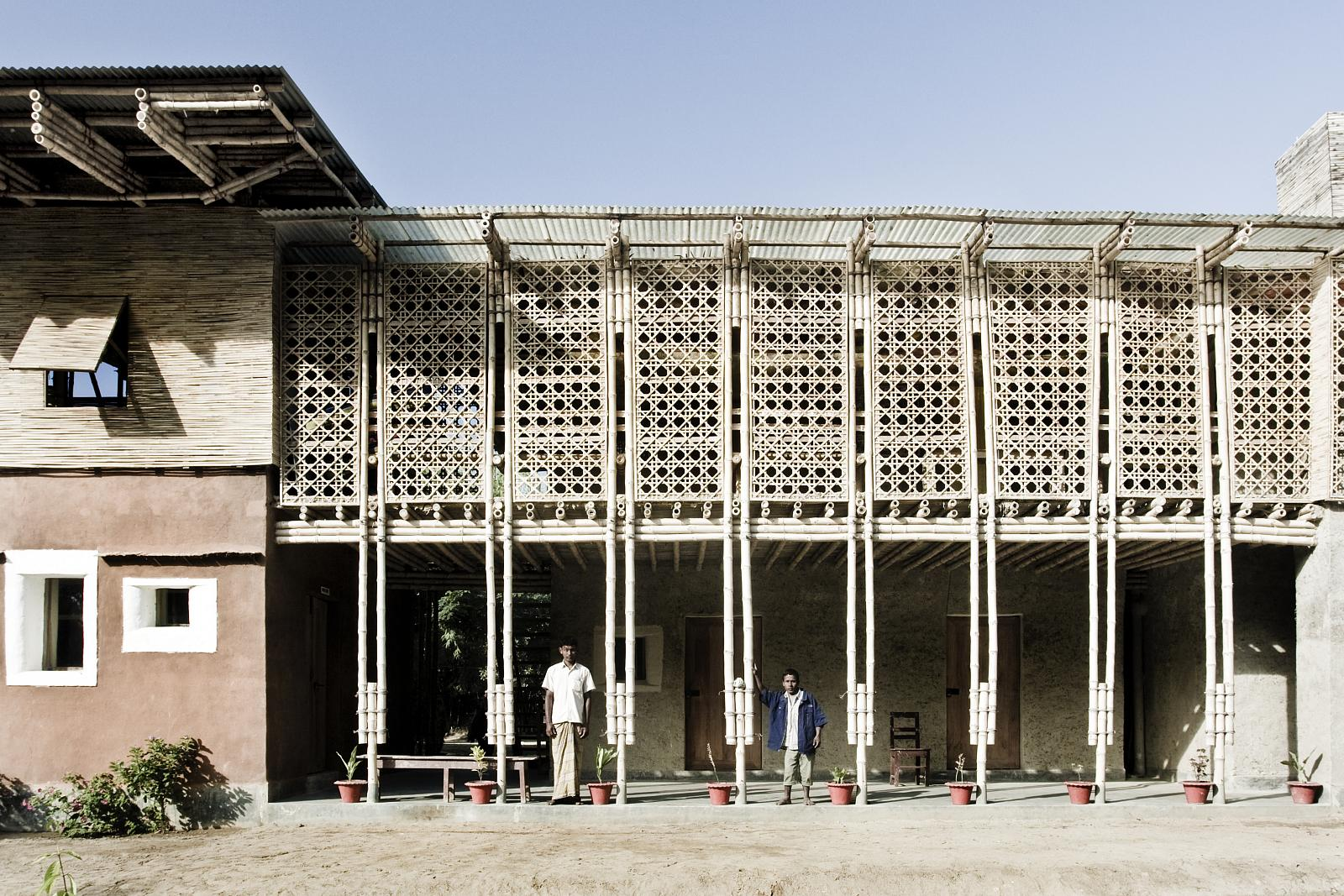
Anna Heringer: DESI Vocational School, Rudrapur, Bangladesh (completed 2006)

Through her projects, Heringer has sought to give local craftsmen and the local community confidence in their use of traditional building methods, preparing them for the future. She also strives to maintain ecological balance, avoiding the detrimental effects of modern architectural methods.

The METI Handmade School, a primary school for 168 students, relies on regional construction and local materials but introduces new approaches for efficiency and structural integrity. As a result of improvements to the bamboo structures and lashing, it was possible to add a second story to the building. Brick foundations were used to minimize the effects of moisture on the earthen walls. The bricks were made by local craftsmen while the remaining construction work was a collaborative effort by the architects, teachers, students and locals.

DESI, a vocational school for electricians, is powered by solar energy but as it is the first mud-built structure in Bangladesh to have indoor plumbing. An extension of the METI project, it called on the services of local students and craftsmen in the hope that the skills they learnt would be reapplied in the region. While local materials, mainly mud and bamboo, were used, structural stability and viability were improved with a masonry foundation and damp-proofing. No machinery was used in the construction apart from making use of cows for mixing the earth, water and rice straw. The building houses two classrooms, two apartments for the instructors with bathroom and toilets, and includes a student bathroom with toilets and sinks on the ground floor. Plumbing additions are unusual in mud buildings as they normally require concrete or masonry structures.

The Training Center for Sustainable Construction in Chwiter, Marrakesh, again draws on local craftsmanship and materials, in this case earth, wood and ceramics.

She has designed the Anandaloy Building, a combined center for people with disabilities and textile studio, in northern Bangladesh.

== Awards ==
- Aga Khan Award for Architecture (2007) for the METI School.
- Bronze for Africa and Middle East, Regional Holcim Awards competition 2011, for the Training Center in Marrakesh.
- Global Award for Sustainable Architecture (2011).
- Moira Gemmill Prize for Emerging Architecture, Shortlisted (2016)
- Obel Award for the Anandaloy Building.

== See also ==
- Women in architecture
- Appropriate technology
