= Khondakar Ashraf Hossain =

Bangladeshi writer

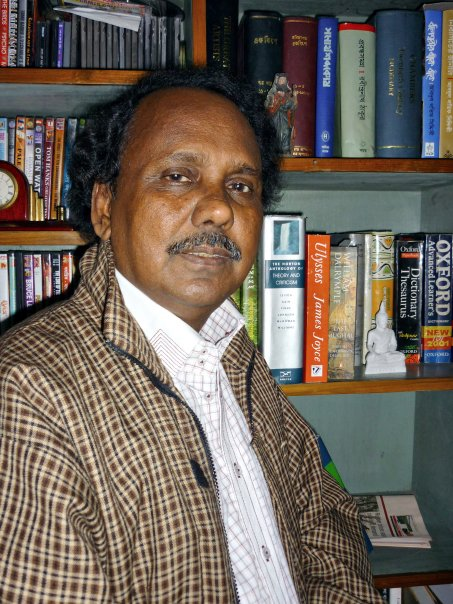
- Hossain in 2008
- Born: 4 January 1950; Joynagar, Jamalpur, Dhaka, East Bengal
- Died: 16 June 2013 (aged 63); Dhaka, Bangladesh
- Resting place: Dhaka, Bangladesh
- Education: MA (linguistics and ELT); MA (English); PhD (English)
- Alma mater: University of Leeds; University of Dhaka
- Occupations: poet; essayist; translator; editor; professor
- Years active: 1980s-2012

Khondakar Ashraf Hossain (Bengali: খোন্দকার আশরাফ হোসেন; 4 January 1950 – 16 June 2013) was a leading postmodernist poet, essayist, translator, and editor from Bangladesh. He wrote more than eighteen titles.

== Early life and education ==
Hossain was born on 4 January 1950 to a Bengali Muslim family of Khondakars in the village of Joynagar in Sarishabari, Jamalpur, then part of the Mymensingh District of East Bengal (now Bangladesh). He earned a BA degree in 1970, and an MA degree in 1971, both are in English and from the University of Dhaka. Later he got MAs in linguistics and ELT from the University of Leeds in 1981. He also obtained a PhD in English from the University of Dhaka and a postgraduate diploma in Teaching English Overseas from the University of Leeds in 1980. His doctoral thesis is entitled Modernism and Beyond: Western Influence on Bangladeshi Poetry, which he defended under Dr. Syed Manzoorul Islam, another doyen and celebrated writer in the department.

== Professional and literary life ==
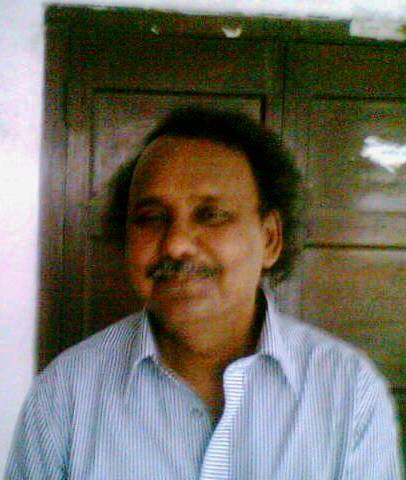
Hossain in 2012.

Hossain was a professor and chairman of the Department of English at the University of Dhaka. In May 2013 he had been appointed as the third vice-chancellor of Jatiya Kabi Kazi Nazrul Islam University at Trishal, Mymensingh, Bangladesh. He was also a member of the Syndicate & Faculty Selection Committee of the BRAC University.

In his decades-long teaching career, he was immensely popular among his students for his unique lectures delivered with ready wit and remarkable quips. He has published a number of collections of poetry and of essays in Bengali and English. About the readership of poetry, he says:

I am not at all concerned with the number of readers of poetry.

—

Hossain translates from Bengali to English and from German and English to Bengali. His poems have been translated into English, German, French, Telugu and Hindi. Hossain edits and publishes a literary magazine: Ekobingsho (English: The Twenty-First) which was founded by Hossain himself in 1985 with its main focus on the new poetry of Bangladesh.

== Theatrical work ==
Hossain patronized a drama group called Nagorik since the seventies, one of Bangladesh's leading theatrical groups, for which Hossein served as both president and dramatist.

== Critical reception ==
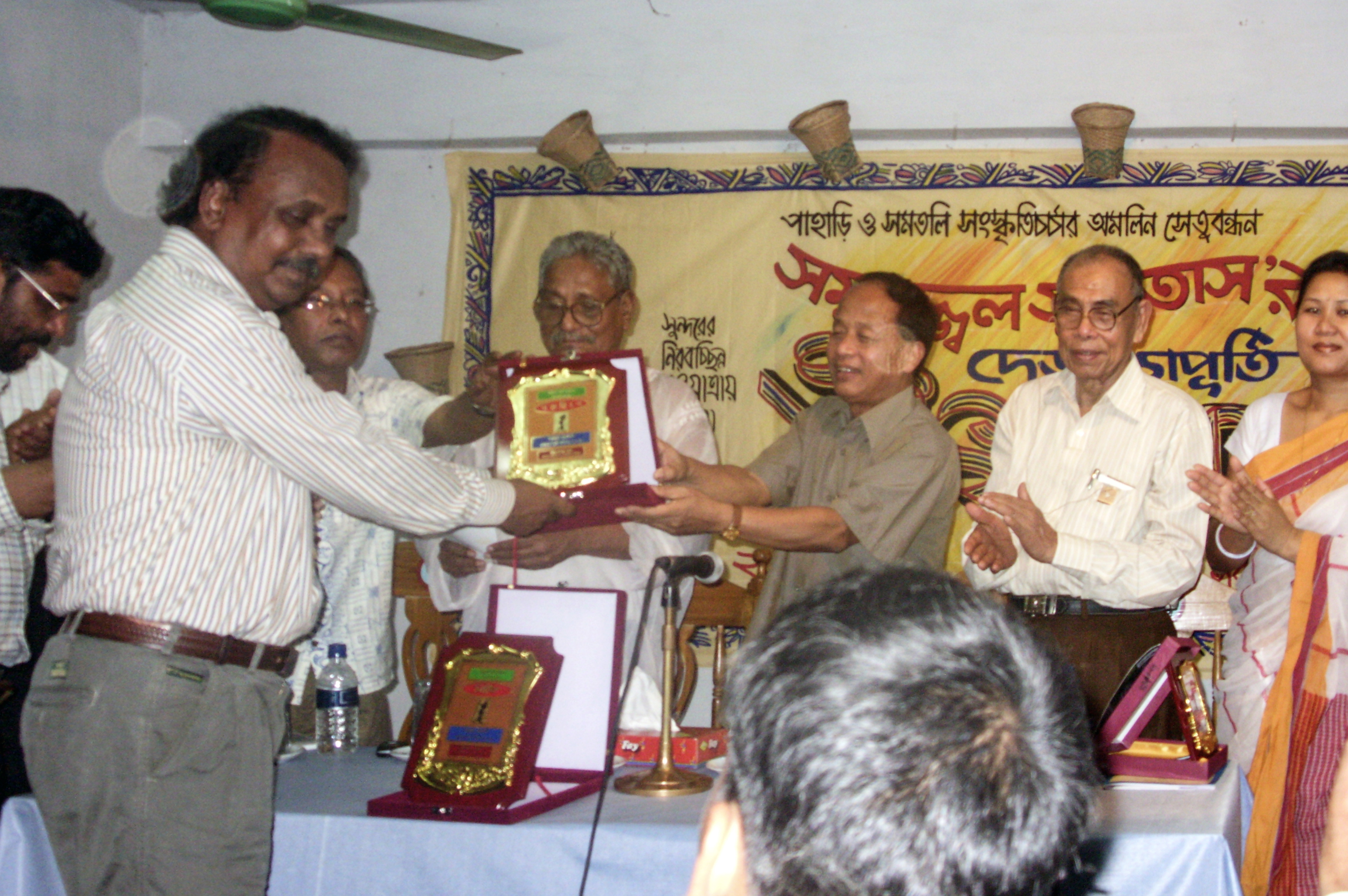
Hossain receiving honorary crest at 18th years celebration of Somujjol Subatas

Hossain wrote a wide variety of poems in lucid language and with innovative and suggestive imagery. Expressiveness and eloquence in his poetry came from his successful, spontaneous combination of national and world heritage and mythology with his personal experience and feelings. Though he began to write when postmodernism was blooming fast in the west, he denies to identify himself as an avowed post-modernist. In his book On Behula's Raft's launch ceremony, he said about himself that "my soul is nourished by the alluvial soil and the moistures of riverine Bangladesh, which is my Behula". Fakrul Alam considered his poems "humorous and witty" in some cases. Syed Manzoorul Islam opined that Hossain at his initial stage was a romantic poet, but is now a realistic poet, as he is writing in a very self-conscious way. His love poems are characterised by stark realism rather than by romantic euphoria. Anisuzzaman deemed his poetry as the socio-political representation of Bangladesh. He explored not only the contemporary social and political condition of his country but also "the grounds of existential philosophy in conceiving human life as fragile yet undying, as self-destructive yet eternal". Hossain's poetry is noted for its engagement with philosophical concerns. For having some drishtantoist poems, he would be important in Bengali poetry.

== Death ==
Hossain, died of a heart attack in Lab-aid hospital in Dhaka at 12 noon on 16 June 2013. He was undergoing treatment at Labaid Specialized Hospital, Dhaka since 14 June due to health complications. He suffered a major heart attack at 8:30 am and died around 11:00 am on 16 June. The ailing professor was being treated when he died at the age of 63.

== Awards and honours ==
- 1987 - Alaol Literary Award (for his poetry)
- 1998 - West Bengal Little Magazine Award (for editing)
- 2013 - Jibananda Puraskar

== Bibliography ==
=== Published books ===
Literary work	Number
Poetry	9
Anthologies	3
Prose	1
Prose collection	7
Translations	10
Total	29

=== Poetry ===
- Tin Ramanir Qasida (1984)
- Partho Tomar Teebro Teer (1986)
- Jibaner Saman Chumuk (1989)
- Sundari O Ghrinar Ghungur (1991)
- Jamuna Parba (1998)
- Janmo Baul (2001)
- Tomar Namey Brishti Namey (2008)
- Aiona Dekhey Andha Manush (2010)
- "Kuyashar Mushayara" 2013

=== Anthologies ===
- Nirbachito Kabita' (1995)
- Kabita Samgraha
- On Behula's Raft (2008)

=== Prose ===
- Romantic and Modern: Latitudes and Longitudes of Poetry

=== Collections of essays ===
- Bangladesher Kabita: Antaranga Abalokan (A Study on Bangladeshi Poetry)
- Chirayata Puraan (Classical Mythology)
- Kabitar Antarjami
- Adhunik Uttaradhunik o Annyanya
- Prasango (Bengali Poetry in the contexts of Modernism, postmodernism and other trends)
- Bishwakabitar Sonali Shasya (Gleanings from World Poetry)
- Modernism and Beyond: Western Influences on Bangladeshi poetry

=== Criritism ===
- Rabindranath, Yeats Ebang Gitanjali (2008)
- Bangalir Dwidha O Rabindranath Ebang Bibidho Tatyatalash (2013)

=== Translations ===
- Selected Poems of Paul Celan (from German into Bengali)
- Folk Poems from Bangladesh (from Bengali into English) co-written with Serajul Islam Choudhury and Kabir Chowdhury
- Folk Tales from Bangladesh (from Bengali into English)
- Elements of General Phonetics by David Abercrombie (into Bengali)
- Sophocles' King Oedipus, Euripides' Alcestis, Medea (into Bengali)
- Terry Eagleton's Literary Theory: An Introduction (into Bengali)
- Edith Hamilton's Mythology (into Bengali)
- Oedipus Rex by Sophocles
- Medea by Euripides
- Alcestis by Euripides

== Editorial ==
- The Dhaka University Studies (Journal of the Faculty of Arts), Editor
- Ekobingsho ("The Twenty-Firs", a poetry magazine), Editor
- Selected Poems of Nirmalendu Goon (Edited, with an introduction)
- The Bangla Academy English–Bengali Dictionary (Co-edited, with a note on pronunciation)
- An English Anthology (Co-edited, published by Department of English, Dhaka University)
