= Carlos Moreno (urbanist) =

Colombian-French author, professor, and architect

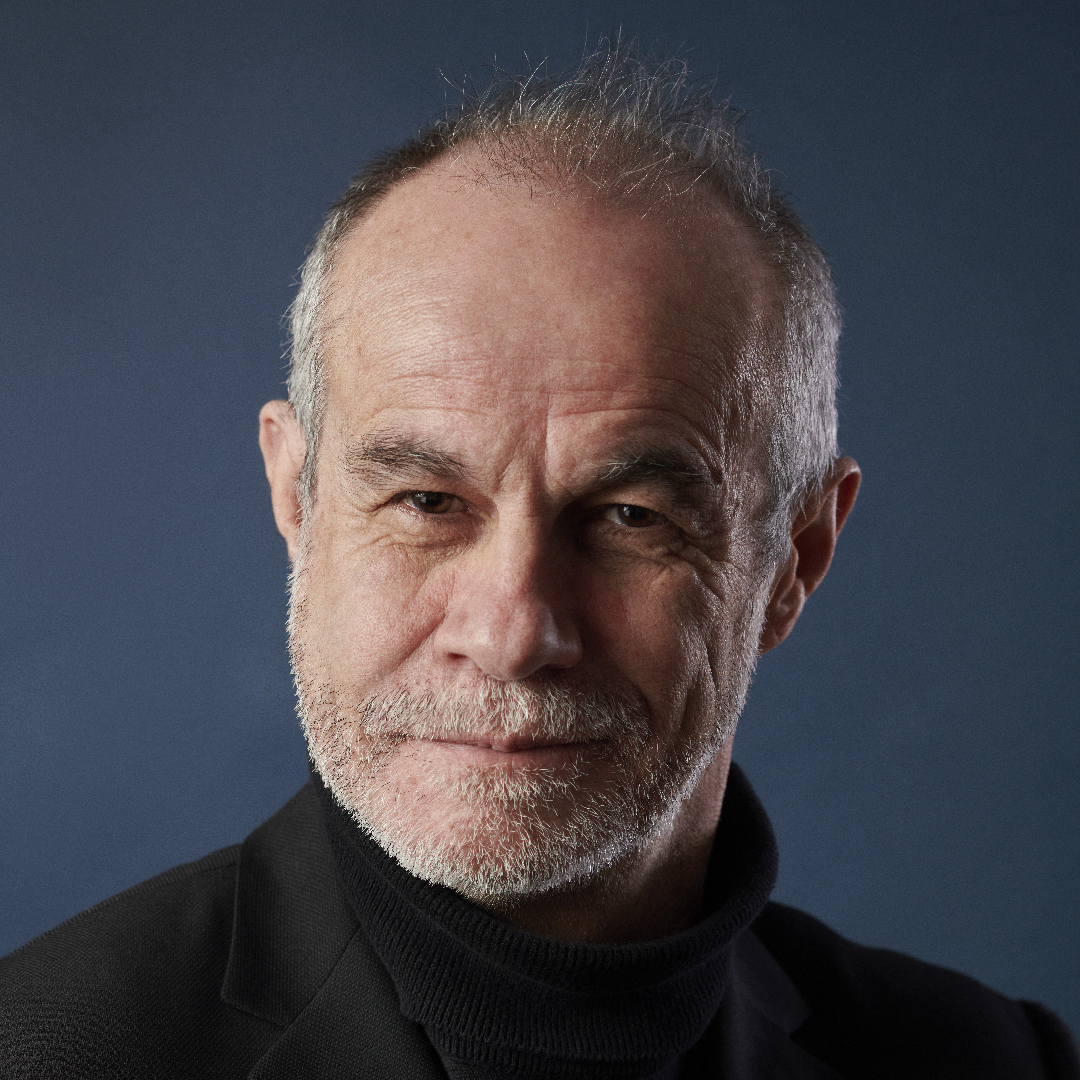
- 2022
- Born: April 16, 1959 (age 67); Tunja, Colombia
- Known for: 15-minute city
- Awards: Knight of The Order of the Legion of Honour (2010); Prospective Medal (2019); Obel Award (2021)
- Website: www.moreno-web.net

Carlos Moreno (born April 16, 1959) is a Franco-Colombian researcher, scientist, and professor at IAE – Paris 1 Sorbonne University. He co-founded the ETI chair "Entrepreneurship – Territory – Innovation" and has conducted research on smart and sustainable cities. He is mainly known for his contribution to the 15-minute city "Ville du quart d’heure" concept.

His work has been recognized by local governments and urban transformation programs both in France and internationally. In 2010, he was awarded the Chevalier of the Legion of Honor by the French Republic, and in 2019, he received the Medal of Prospective from the French Academy of Architecture.

== Early life and education ==
Carlos Moreno was born in Tunja, department of Boyacá, Colombia, in 1959 as the child of rural farmers. His father was illiterate, but ensured that Moreno, and his seven siblings, received an education. Moreno and his family later moved to the city of Cali where Moreno attended public school and eventually won a scholarship to the city’s university.

In 1975, while a student in Colombia, Moreno joined the left-wing M-19 movement. As the Colombian military battled M-19, Moreno fled to France in 1979 at the age of 20 and was granted political refugee status. Moreno went on to study in Paris and graduated from Paris-Sud University in 1983.

== Career ==
Moreno began his career as a teacher-researcher at the Université de Paris Sud in 1982, working primarily in the computer and robotics laboratory. In 1990, Moreno joined the Université d’Evry and later obtained the Habilitation à Directeur de Recherches (HDR) in mathematics and computer science, with a specialization in robotics.

In the 1990s, Moreno worked on the adaptive robotization of multi-competent production systems for the automotive assembly industry.

In 1998, Moreno established Sinovia at the Laboratoire des Méthodes Informatiques, LaMI. The company received initial funding from the French government fund, ANVAR, and subsequent investments from business angels and investment funds.

By 2000, Moreno had designed a self-adaptive furnace control suitable for firing aircraft parts, specifically wings, made of composite materials. In 2001, he developed multi-technical and multi-service urban resource-sharing platforms, leading to the creation of "Open Components". That year, he also designed control systems for nuclear reactors with a focus on steam generator monitoring. These systems were later implemented in all French nuclear plants and were integrated internationally, using his "Plug & Net Open Components" methodology. A year later, Moreno introduced an intelligent street lighting system that was based on the "Plug & Net" design.

In 2003, in collaboration with the bioinformatics laboratory of Evry and Génopole, Moreno was involved in creating robotics for genetic analysis. A year later, under the Seveso directive, Mareno introduced the "Plug & View" system. Later he also developed "Alertbox", a device designed for residential installation to provide crisis alerts to the public.

Between 2010 and 2015, Moreno advised GDF SUEZ Vice-President Guy Lacroix on the "City of the Future" program. He was involved in the establishment of the Carnot Institutes in 2006 and collaborated with the National Research Agency (ANR), the creation and monitoring of the Technological Research Institutes (IRT) and the Instituts d'Excellence en Énergies Décarbonées (IEED), which later became Instituts de la Transition Énergétique (ITÉ).

In 2010, Moreno joined the Strategic Orientation Advisory Committee of the French government program, Investissements d'Avenir. He also researched cities as complex systems and worked on a digital platform related to city infrastructure.

In 2015, Moreno coined the term 15-minute city, "Ville du quart d'heure", at the Paris United Nations Climate Change (COP21) Conference He became a scientific advisor to Paris's mayor, Anne Hidalgo, who embraced the Ville du quart d'heure concept, and made it a key part of her election campaign and mayoral policy.

In 2017, Moreno joined the Paris Business School of Management at the Paris 1 Panthéon-Sorbonne. He is co-founder of "Entrepreneurship Territory Innovation" – ETI – which focuses its research on urban and territorial mutations.

In January 2022, the City Diplomacy Lab of Columbia University appointed Moreno as a member of its scientific board. In 2022, he launched the Global Observatory of Sustainable Proximities. The 15-minute city was a notable recommendation in UN-Habitat's World Cities Report that year.

When asked if building heights should be limited, Moreno believes the ideal building height is between 6 or 7 storeys, but also emphasised green spaces.

Throughout his career, Moreno has been involved in numerous governmental committees and public service activities. His TEDx presentation on the 15-minute city has reached over 1.5 million views and is available in 18 languages.

== Awards and recognition ==
- 2010: Knight of the Order of the Legion of Honour
- The Spanish private sector for sustainable mobility, grouped in the "Plataforma de Empresas Para La Movilidad Sostenible" to Carlos Moreno for the 15-Minute City project.
- 2019: Foresight Medal by the French Academy of Architecture
- 2021: Obel Award for his contribution to 15 Minute City.
- 2021: Leadership Award Smart City Expo World Congress in Barcelona
- 2022: European Congress of Local Governments Award, Poland
- 2023: The 100 Most Influential Urbanists by Planetizen

== Bibliography ==
=== Books ===
- The 15-Minute City: The Urban Planning Concept to Building Sustainable Cities
- From the Global City to the 15 Minute City

=== Publications ===
- "Urban life and proximity at the time of Covid-19”, Editions de l’Observatoire (2020)
- "Droit de cité, de la ville-monde à la ville du quart d’heure”, Editions de l’Observatoire (2020)
