= METI Handmade School =

Coordinates: 25.7260°N 88.5491°E

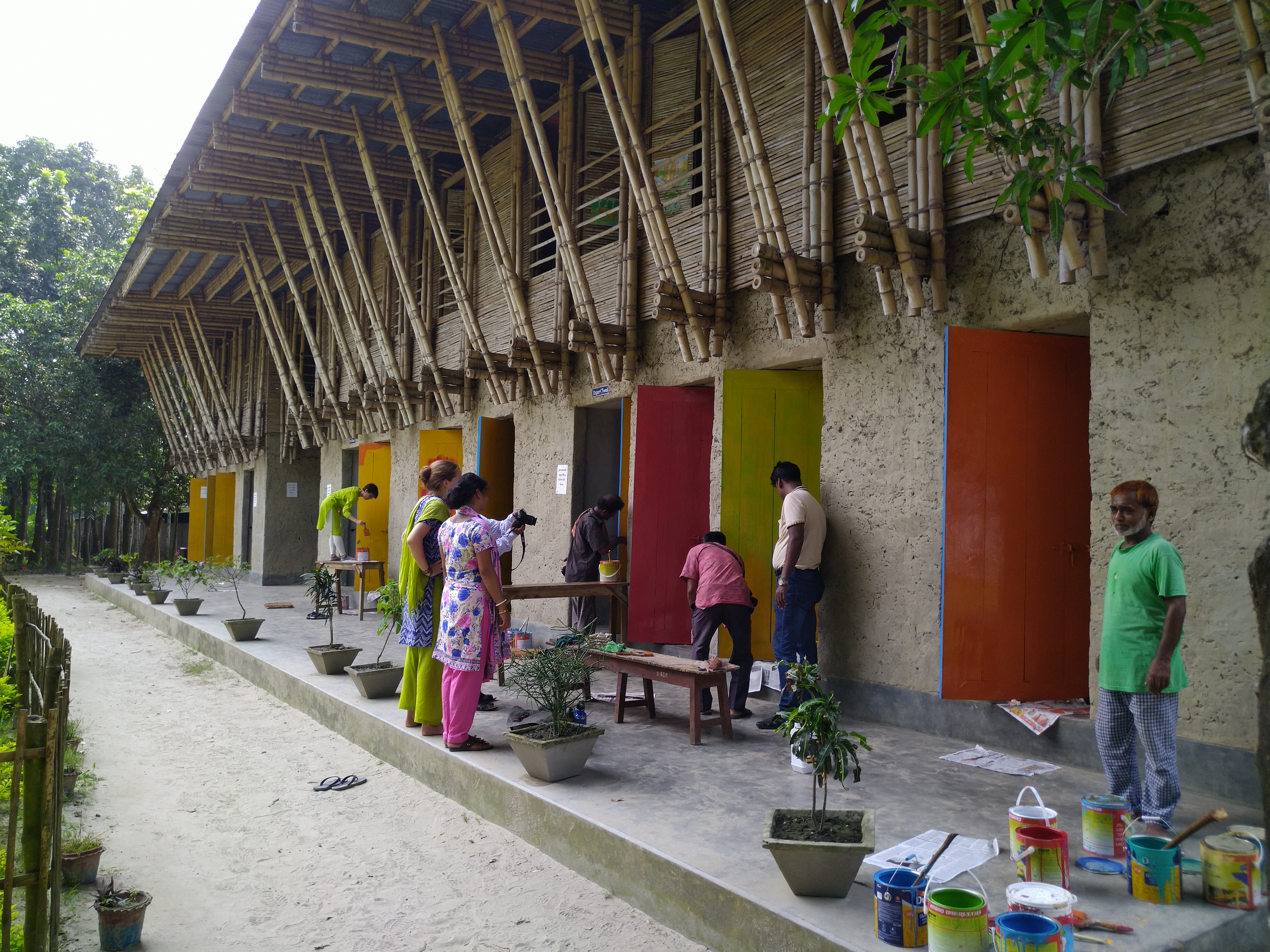

Information
- Established: 2005; 21 years ago
- Enrollment: 168

The METI Handmade School, a primary school for 168 students located in Rudrapur in Dinajpur district of Bangladesh, was built with the assistance of local craftsmen making use of traditional materials, primarily mud and bamboo. An example of sustainable architecture, the project received the Aga Khan Award for Architecture in 2007 for its simple, humane approach and beauty, and for the level of cooperation achieved between architects, craftsmen, clients and users.

== Background ==
In 1997, Anna Heringer from Bavaria in southern Germany, visited Bangladesh to work as a volunteer with the Bangladeshi NGO, Dipshikha, which assists marginalized communities in areas such as education, agriculture and skills development. While studying architecture in Linz, Austria, she returned to Rudrapur with three other students. As part of their university research, they made a proposal under Dipshikha's programme for Modern Education and Training (METI). In 2004, after graduating with a thesis titled "School: handmade in Bangladesh", Anna Heringer again visited the village, maintaining the contacts she had enjoyed over the years. Unable to find suitable local expertise, Paul Charwa Tigga Executive Director of Dipshikha appointed her as architect for a project to build new classrooms for the village school with a mandate to make use of local materials. Heringer began her involvement by coordinating fund-raising with the German NGO, Shanti, which had initially introduced her to Dipshikha, successfully raising the US$35,000 needed for the project. While the original requirement had simply been to build additional classrooms for the Dipshikha school, Paul Charwa Tigga and Heringer persuaded those responsible to use local materials rather than adopting the usual concrete construction.

Commissioned in January 2004, design work started in March 2004 and was approved in August 2005. The construction was completed over a period of four months from September 2005 to December 2005.

== The building ==
Anna Heringer worked together with her colleague Eike Roswag, developing a design based on regional construction methods and local materials but introducing new approaches for efficiency and structural integrity. As a result of improvements to the bamboo structures and lashing, it was possible to add a second floor to the building. Brick foundations were used to minimize the effects of moisture on the earthen walls. The bricks were made by local craftsmen while the remaining construction work was a collaborative effort by the architects, teachers, students and locals. In addition to the classrooms required, there are also spaces where the children can interact. The classrooms on the ground floor are enclosed by a mud wall while those on the first floor have slatted bamboo walls providing diffused light and natural ventilation. The regularly spaced vertical bamboo support connected to horizontal slats create a powerful decorative effect enhanced by the sunlight.

Among the notable advances made in the use of local materials were the introduction of a damp proof course and a brick foundation as well as the addition of straw to the loam mixture of earth and water. In regard to the use of bamboo, progress was made in constructing a layered ceiling of bamboo sticks, bamboo boards and earth, and in building the first floor walls and roof with a frame consisting of beams (four layers of joined bamboo sticks) and vertical and diagonal poles.

== Awards ==
In 2007, the building received the Aga Khan award. There was special mention of the way in which "easily available local materials" had been used "to create a new model for school construction that is beautiful, simple and humane."

In 2009, the Curry Stone Design Prize was awarded to Anna Heringer for the METI Handmade School and two related projects in Rudrapur. Reference was made to a "new handmade approach to sustainable building" under which local materials are used by local laborers "who learn new construction methods, offering an elegant alternative to the trend toward buildings made from western materials such as cement and steel."
