= Commercially important person =

Commercially Important Person (Bangladesh)
- Awarded for: Excellence in business for Bangladesh
- Sponsored by: Government of Bangladesh
- Location: Dhaka
- Country: Bangladesh
- Presented by: Ministry of Commerce
- Website: www.epb.gov.bd/

A commercially important person (CIP) refers to a high-value commercial clients. The term is typically used in the context of airport business lounges, especially in Asian countries, but also more generally amongst travel agencies. In Bangladesh, the term has a much more specific usage and is a national-level honour.

== In Bangladesh ==
In Bangladesh a CIP is an individual who is allowed to receive a number of benefits and facilities for the period of one year after recognition for their contribution to their respective sector. Such a CIP receives a special ID card from the Ministry of Commerce and from the Government of the People's Republic of Bangladesh. Such CIPs are invited to the Citizen's reception for various national ceremonies including entry to the Bangladesh Secretariat and the city corporation. CIPs have priority seating opportunities in most domestic public transport during business trips.

To facilitate visas, the Ministry of Foreign Affairs offers a Letter of Introduction to the Embassy concerned. CIPs get access to the Very important person (VIP) lounges at airports, and their family members receive priority when booking cabins at government hospitals.

Generally, CIPs are either those who export products or those regarding businesses. CIP's primary list is prepared based on the amount of export, income tax and value-added tax (VAT), the type of business, employment, etc. Afterward, the people who qualify are selected for the honor.

In October 2024, the government cancelled all activities related to issuing CIP cards for 2023.
