= Kate Orff =

American landscape architect (born 1971)

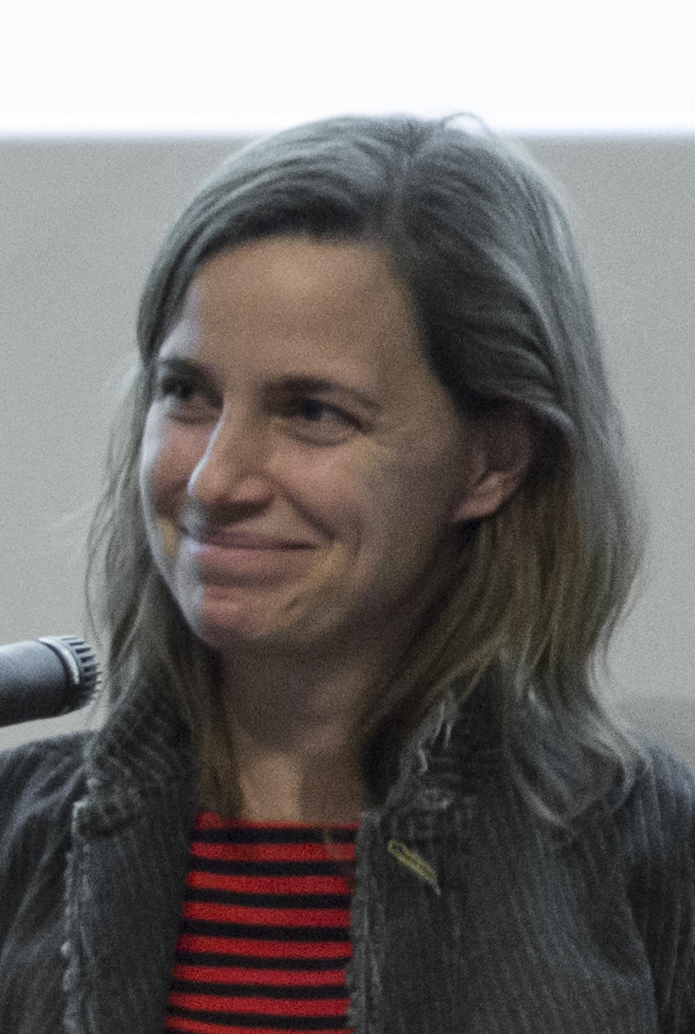
- Orff in 2015
- Born: 1971 (age 54–55)
- Education: B.A., University of Virginia, 1993; M.L.A., Harvard University, 1997
- Occupation: Landscape architect

Kate Orff (born 1971) is an American landscape architect. She is the founding principal of SCAPE, a design-driven landscape architecture and urban design studio based in New York. She is also director of the Urban Design Program (MSAUD) at Columbia University's Graduate School of Architecture, Planning and Preservation and co-director of the Center for Resilient Cities and Landscapes. Orff is the first landscape architect to receive a MacArthur Fellowship.

Orff's work focuses on retooling the practice of landscape architecture relative to uncertainty of climate change and fostering social life which she has explored through publications, activism, research, and projects. She is known for leading complex, creative, and collaborative work processes that advance broad environmental and social prerogatives.

She has designed projects across the United States and internationally. She lectures widely in the U.S. and abroad on the topic of urban landscape and new paradigms of thinking, collaborating and designing for the Anthropocene Era. Orff is also listed on TED talks, the Architectural League NY, Aperture Foundation, and WNYC. Orff also teaches interdisciplinary seminars and design studios at Columbia University.

She was listed first by Elle magazine in 2011 as one of nine women involved as "fixers" for mankind for her concept of "oyster-tecture", i.e. building reef-like structures with oysters to clean the water at New York City's waterfront.

She is the director of the Urban Design Program at Columbia University Graduate School of Architecture, Planning and Preservation, where she is founder and co-director of the Urban Landscape Lab. According to the Urban Landscape Lab biographical information her office, SCAPE, has won local and national design awards. She was named a Dwell magazine ‘Design Leader’ and H&G's 50 For the Future of Design.

== Early life and education ==
Orff grew up in a once-gated suburban community in Crofton, Maryland, that was designed for the use of cars and created on the steadfast idea that oil was what kept modern settlements relevant. During Orff's high school years at the Severn School, she worked an odd string of jobs; for one summer, she as a fishmonger and another she worked at a plant nursery where she learned about plants and began to enjoy the activity of gardening.

Orff attended the University of Virginia in the undergraduate program of Political and Social Thought, which was founded by Richard Rorty. The program offered Orff freedom in choosing the path that she wanted to take within her studies. This led to her looking at women's studies, environmental sciences, sculpture, forest ecology which intertwined the arts and science in the University of Virginia curriculum. It was during this time in her early studies that Orff wrote her thesis on ecofeminism in which she found connections between environmental degradation, poverty, and women's issues. In addition, Orff learned about architecture school and enrolled in Reuben Rainey's class who is a well-known teacher of landscape architecture history at the school. During his class, Orff realized that landscape architecture was a combination of many things that she was passionate about; it integrated her interests in science and politics as well as her talent in art and design. While at the University of Virginia, Orff played varsity lacrosse and also coached a high-school girls’ team. She then graduated with Distinction from the Bachelor of Political and Social Thought. Before returning to school in a Master in Landscape Architecture program from the Graduate School of Design at Harvard University, Orff traveled to Chile and worked on a women's health magazine.

== Design philosophy ==
Orff's passion for the role that landscape architecture takes in cities has led her to the belief that landscape architects must do more than "beautify"; instead, they must assist in resetting the ecosystems to reconnect people to each other through social spaces that also implement ecological services. She states that, since the formation of the discipline, landscape architects had been working closely with the carbon-centric world; people have been creating wonderful gardens as a focus for the field but has been letting the Earth decay in the back-drop.

To redirect the attention to the planet's ecological systems as well as link them to policy ideas and infrastructure, Orff constructs a framework of engagement for her designs to create a resilient landscape that can handle future threats of the environment in the future sea-level rise and increase wave action. Orff's studio, SCAPE, which she established in 2007, is well known for its ecologically driven projects throughout the world and takes on many projects that emphasize sustainability due to her feelings of responsibility for the environment. In her studio, Orff and her team produce a design that is based on science and research as well as an activist approach.

== Career ==
In 2004, following a period employed by SWA and Hargreaves Associates, Orff moved to New York and started her practice out of her apartment near Union Square. She started taking on employees in 2007 and thus formally established her firm, SCAPE. In 2007 Orff married Oded Horodniceanu son of Michael Horodniceanu the New York Metropolitan Transportation Authority's president of capital construction.

Orff and her firm, SCAPE, have developed a design called "Oyster-tecture," which serves as ecological infrastructure to filter polluted water and mitigate the effects of storm surge and sea-level rise through the construction of oyster reefs. Following Hurricane Sandy in 2012, Orff and SCAPE were selected to join an interdisciplinary team for Mayor Bloomberg's Special Initiative for Rebuilding and Resiliency (SIRR). SCAPE's role in the harbor-wide study was to integrate natural systems as risk-reduction infrastructure, and layering strategies for enhanced coastal protection and ecosystem health. The project was awarded an ASLA-NY honor award in 2014.

In 2014, SCAPE was recognized as the winner of the Rebuild By Design competition in order to preserve communities after Hurricane Sandy in 2012. SCAPE's winning project was a play off of Oyster-tecture called "Living Breakwaters" and was meant to reduce erosion on the shoreline of Brooklyn, New York. Living Breakwaters serves as an environmentally-friendly, natural oyster reef that should be able to "clean up to millions of liters of harbor water each day." Living Breakwaters has won not only the Rebuild by Design competition, but also the Buckminster Fuller Challenge in 2014, the ACEC NY Engineering Excellence Award in 2015, and the National Achievement Award also in 2015. The construction phase of the project was completed in 2024.

Orff was one of presenters at the Landscape Architecture Foundation's The New Landscape Declaration: A Summit on Landscape Architecture and the Future held in Philadelphia on June 10–11, 2016. This summit brought together the leading minds in the field of landscape architecture to create a declaration on how we need to move forward in a challenging future. The subsequent book that followed this summit published an essay by Orff entitled “Urban Ecology as Activism.”

In 2018, Orff was a keynote speaker at United States Sen. Sheldon Whitehouse's ninth annual Rhode Island Energy, Environment and Oceans Leaders Day, held at the Rhode Island Convention Center. The event was attended by approximately 200 attendees from federal and state agencies, municipalities, environmental groups, and the energy industry.

As a landscape architect, Orff is accredited in New York, Massachusetts, Connecticut, New Jersey, Pennsylvania, Kentucky, South Carolina, Minnesota, and Arkansas. She is also CLARB Certified.

== Awards ==
In 2017, Orff was the recipient of a "Genius Grant" from the John D. and Catherine T. MacArthur Foundation. Orff received the grant for her designs of "adaptive and resilient habitats" and for encouraging stewardship of the ecological systems that underlie the built environment.

In 2019, Orff was elevated to the American Society of Landscape Architects (ASLA) Council of Fellows. Also in 2019, Orff was honored as a Waterfront Alliance's Hero of the Harbor. In January 2024, Orff received an honorary doctorate from the Delft University of Technology for her contributions in the field. In March 2024, Orff received Jefferson Medal for Architecture. She has been selected as the 2025 Gold Medal recipient by the Tau Sigma Delta Honor Society for Architecture and Allied Arts, in collaboration with the Association of Collegiate Schools of Architecture (ACSA). Orff was named a TIME 100 honoree in 2024, She is scheduled to deliver the closing keynote address at the ACSA's 113th annual conference, taking place from March 20–22, 2025, in New Orleans.

== Major works ==
In 2011, Princeton University published Gateway, Visions for an Urban National Park by Kate Orff. In 2012, the Aperture Foundation published Petrochemical America, a book by Orff which won the National ALSA award in the communications category in 2013. Petrochemical America featured Richard Misrach's photography of the industrialized Mississippi River and visual narratives by Orff and SCAPE.

== Publications ==
- "Toward an Urban Ecology" (Monacelli Press, 2016)
- "Petrochemical America" (Aperture, 2012)
- "Gateways: Visions for an Urban National Park" (Princeton Architectural Press, 2011)

== Bibliography ==
- Brash, Alexander; Hand, Jamie; Orff, Kate, eds. (2011). Gateway: Visions for an Urban National Park. New York: Princeton Architectural Press. ISBN 978-1-56898-955-6.
- Misrach, Richard; Orff, Kate (2012). Petrochemical America. New York: Aperture Foundation. ISBN 978-1-59711-191-1.
- Orff, Kate (2016). Toward an Urban Ecology. New York: The Monacelli Press. ISBN 978-1-58093-436-7.

== External links and further readings ==
- Kate Orff on X
- Orff, Kate, and Claire Martin. 2015. “Kate Orff : Translating Research into Action.” Landscape Architecture Australia, no. 145 (February): 52–56.
- Orff, Kate. 2020. “What Is Design Now?: Unmaking the Landscape.” Architectural Design 90 (1): 94–99.
- Rehak, Melanie. 2012. “What Kate Orff Sees.” Landscape Architecture Magazine 102 (5): 80–97.
