= K. Lutful Elahi =

Bangladeshi historian, academic, and professor

Professor Doctor Kh. Lutful Elahi
- লুৎফুল ইলাহী
- Born: Rangpur, Bangladesh
- Occupations: Academic, historian and professor
- Employer: Jahangirnagar University
- Known for: Role in protecting students during the July 2024 Uprising
- Relatives: Khondkar-Elahi family of Rangpur
- Website: Official website

Khondkar Lutful Elahi is a Bangladeshi historian, academic, and professor in the Department of History at Jahangirnagar University. Hailing from the prominent Khondkar-Elahi family of Rangpur, he also serves as the chairman of the university's provost committee.

Elahi gained national media attention for his role in protecting students from attacks during the July Uprising in 2024. During a clash on July 16, 2024, while attempting to shelter protesting students from armed activists and law enforcement, he was struck by police-fired rubber bullets, sustaining severe injuries that resulted in the permanent loss of vision in his right eye.

== Career and academic governance ==
Elahi is an academic who has held several teaching and administrative roles at Jahangirnagar University. He is a professor in the Department of History, where his research and scholarly output includes publishing on regional humanitarian and socio-political themes, such as his 2021 book Rohingya and Bangladesh.

In addition to his faculty duties, Elahi has been involved in following university posts:

- Chairman of the Provost Committee - He serves as the head of the university's central committee governing all residential student halls.
- Provost of Shaheed Tajuddin Ahmad Hall - He is the administrative head and provost of the Shaheed Tajuddin Ahmad residential hall at Jahangirnagar University.
- JUTA Executive Member - He was elected as an Executive Member of the Jahangirnagar University Teachers' Association during the university's academic elections.
- JUCSU Election Commission Member - Following the political shifts in the country, he was appointed as one of the members of the 5-member Election Commission tasked with organizing the Jahangirnagar University Central Students' Union (JUCSU) elections.
- Member Secretary of Muktijuddher Adorsher Shikkhok Parishad - A pro-Awami League teachers' alliance.

== Role in the 2024 July Uprising ==
Elahi was hit by rubber bullets shot by police during the uprising in 16 July in front of the university's vice-chancellor's residence. He was said to form a human shield for the students.

Approximately 70 pellets entered Elahi's body. He received treatment in National Institute of Ophthalmology & Hospital and three other hospitals in Thailand. Only five pellets could be removed. A pellet remained lodged in his right eye which made him lose his eyesight. The university administration bore the cost his treatments.
