= Rezaul Alam Khandaker =

Bangladeshi politician

Member of Bangladesh Parliament
- In office 1979–1986

Personal details
- Political party: Bangladesh Nationalist Party

Rezaul Alam Khandaker (Bengali: রেজাউল আলম খন্দকার) is a Bangladesh Nationalist Party politician and a former member of parliament for Rangpur-18.

== Career ==
Khandaker was elected to parliament from Rangpur-18 as a Bangladesh Nationalist Party candidate in 1979.
