= 15-minute city =

Urban accessibility concept

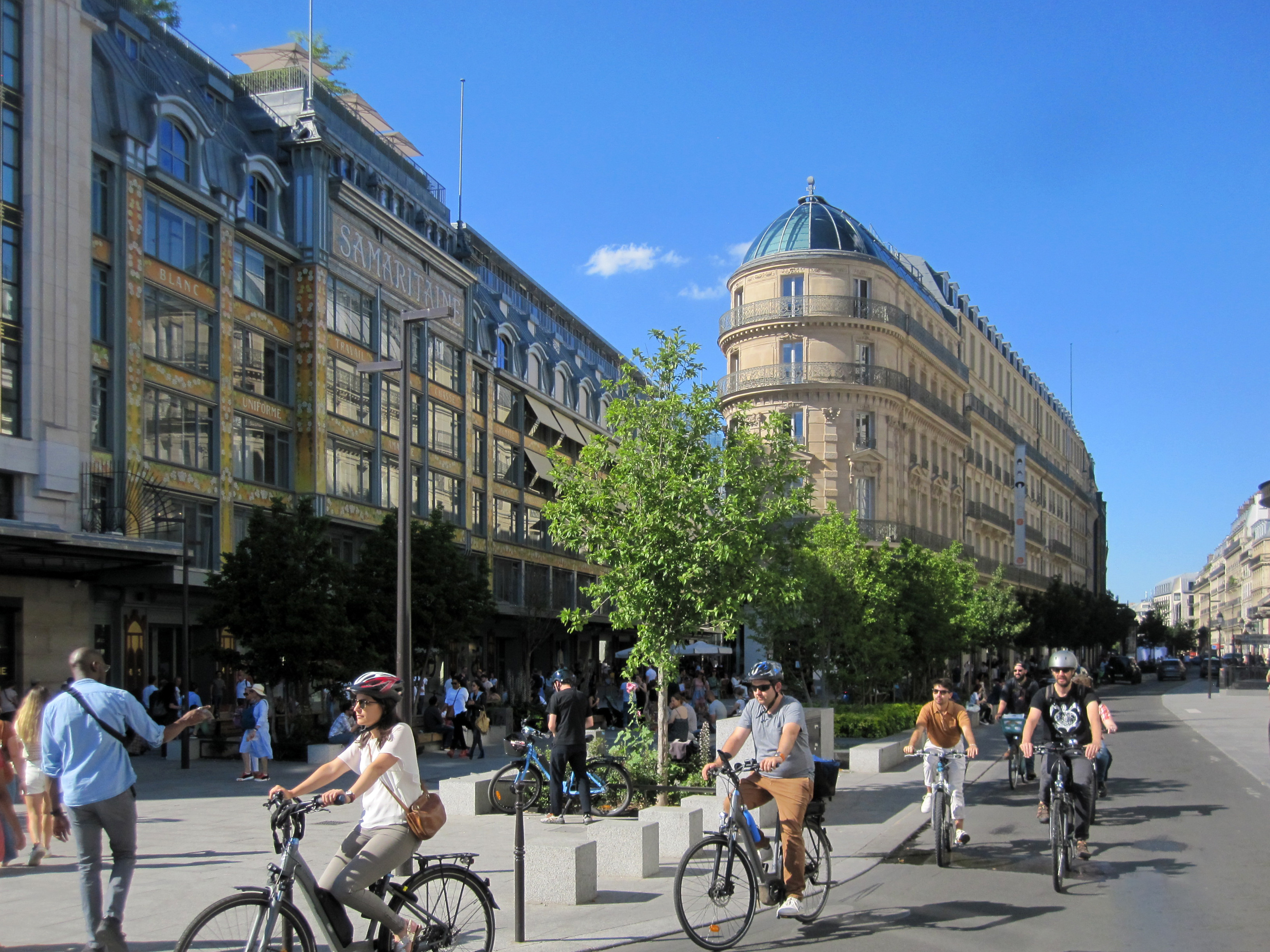
People walking and cycling in Paris, France. The concept of 15-minute cities gained traction after being advocated by Paris mayor Anne Hidalgo.

The 15-minute city (FMC or 15mC) is an urban planning concept in which most daily necessities and services – such as work, shopping, education, healthcare and leisure – can be easily reached by a 15-minute walk, bike ride, or public transit ride from any point in the city. This approach aims to reduce car dependency, promote healthy and sustainable living, and improve wellbeing and quality of life for city dwellers.

Implementing the concept typically involves mixed-use development, pedestrian friendly design, and improved access to public transit, alongside policies that reduce car dependency. This change in lifestyle may include remote working which reduces daily commuting and is supported by the recent widespread availability of information and communications technology. The concept has been described as a "return to a local way of life".

As people spend more time working from home or near their homes, there is less demand for large central office spaces and more need for flexible, local co-working spaces. The 15-minute city concept suggests a shift toward a decentralized network of workspaces within residential neighbourhoods, reducing the need for long commutes and promoting work-life balance.

The concept builds on earlier planning traditions as they emphasize walkability and mixed-use development, including New Urbanism and transit oriented development. In recent times, it builds upon similar pedestrian-centered principles found in New Urbanism, transit-oriented development, and other proposals that promote walkability, mixed-use developments, and compact, livable communities. Numerous models have been proposed about how the concept can be implemented, such as 15-minute cities being built from a series of smaller 5-minute neighborhoods, also known as complete communities or walkable neighborhoods. For walking, the most common way of active travel, a 15-minute radius corresponds roughly to a 1 km (0.6 mi) distance. (Note: 1 km in 15 minutes equates to 4 km/h (2.5 mph))

The concept gained significant traction in recent years after Paris mayor Anne Hidalgo included a plan to implement the 15-minute city concept during her 2020 re-election campaign. Since then, a number of cities worldwide have adopted the same goal and many researchers have used the 15-minute model as a spatial analysis tool to evaluate accessibility levels within the urban fabric.

In early 2023, conspiracy theories emerged that described 15-minute cities as instruments of government repression, claiming that they were a pretext to introduce restrictions on travel by car.

== History ==
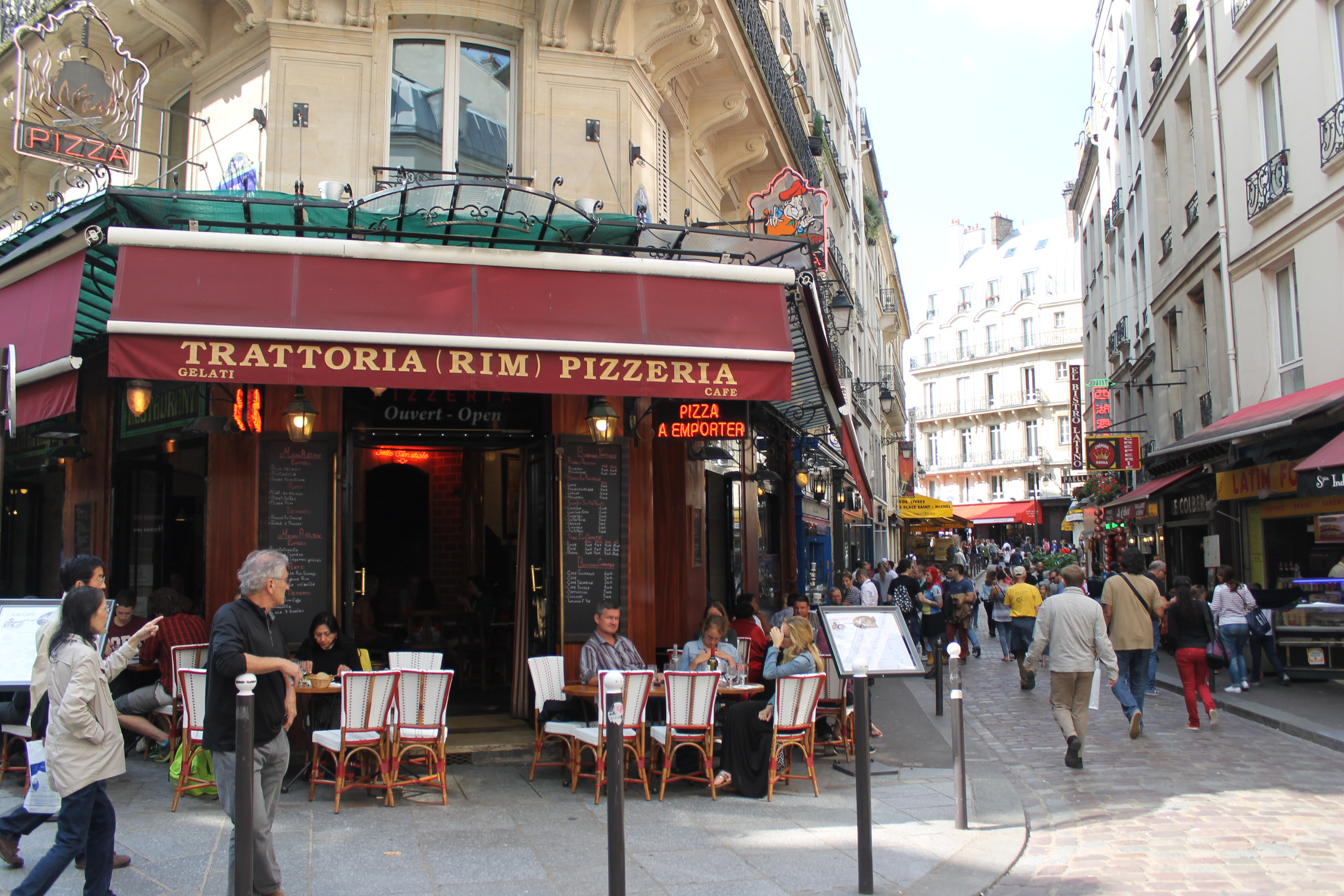
The 15-minute city was influenced by cities such as Paris, in which a range of amenities tend to be within walking distance.

The 15-minute city concept is claimed to be derived from historical ideas about proximity and walkability, such as Clarence Perry's neighborhood unit although the association is explicitly derived from secondary sources - Moreno has never associated the 15 minute city with Perry's work or Ebenezer Howard's Garden City ideas in any of his work. As an inspiration for the 15-minute city, Carlos Moreno – a Smart Cities Ambassador to Anne Hidalgo – later spoke about Jane Jacobs's ideals presented in The Death and Life of Great American Cities. Jacobs also emphasized the importance of human-scale neighborhoods with mixed use, as well as her opposition to car-dependent urban planning and urban sprawl. She believed that cities work best when they are shaped by local communities and are human-scale in terms of daily life. Retrospective publications align Jacobs' ideals with the concept of the 15-minute city.

The ongoing climate crisis and global COVID-19 pandemic prompted Moreno's team to frame a heightened focus on his 15-minute city branding concept. In July 2020, the C40 Cities Climate Leadership Group published a framework for cities to "build back better" using the 15-minute concept, referring specifically to plans implemented in Milan, Madrid, Edinburgh, and Seattle after COVID-19 outbreaks. Their report highlights the importance of inclusive community engagement through mechanisms like participatory budgeting and adjusting city plans and infrastructure to encourage dense, complete, overall communities.

A manifesto published in Barcelona in April 2020 by architecture theorist Massimo Paolini – the Manifesto for the Reorganisation of the City after COVID-19 – proposed radical change in the organization of cities in the wake of COVID-19. The proposal was endorsed by more than 2000 people, among them 160 academics and 350 architects. The proposal has four key elements: reorganization of mobility, (re)naturalization of the city, de-commodification of housing, and de-growth.

In early 2023, conspiracy theories began to flourish that described 15-minute cities as instruments of government repression, claiming that they were a pretext to introduce restrictions on travel by car. In fact, the '15-minute city' proposals do not involve any restrictions on travel by car, but emphasize a reduction in car dependency. – Unrelated measures (Note: see for example Road space rationing, Congestion pricing and Low Traffic Neighbourhoods) introduced to reduce traffic in some cities have been somehow confused with '15-minute cities'.

== Research models ==
The 15-minute city is a proposal for developing a polycentric city, where density is made pleasant, one's proximity is vibrant, and social intensity (a large number of productive, intricately linked social ties) is real. The key element of the model has been described by Carlos Moreno as "chrono-urbanism" or a refocus of interest on time value rather than time cost.

=== Moreno and the 15-minute city ===
Professor Carlos Moreno's 2016 opinion piece in La Tribune business magazine introduced the 15-minute city concept as an aspirational call for future cities to be polycentric and to fulfill several essential functions within a 15-minute walk or bike ride from their dwellings such as living, working, and leisure. He describes a transformation from monofunctional urban spaces as being driven by four components: density, proximity, diversity and ubiquity.

Moreno later cites the work of Nikos Salingaros, who theorizes that an optimal density for urban development exists which would encourage local solutions to local problems. The authors discuss proximity in terms of both space and time, arguing that a 15-minute city would reduce the space and time necessary for activity. Diversity in this 15-minute city model refers to mixed-use development and multicultural neighborhoods, both of which Moreno and others argue would improve the urban experience and boost community participation in the planning process. Digitalization is a key aspect of the 15-minute city derived from smart cities. Moreno and others argue that a Fourth Industrial Revolution has reduced the need for commuting because of access to technology like virtual communication and online shopping. They conclude by stating that these four components, when implemented at scale, would form an accessible city with a high quality of life.

Recent research has attempted to quantify how closely cities align with the 15-minute model using spatial accessibility metrics. A 2024 study in Nature Cities developed a global framework assessing thousands of cities and measuring access to services within 15-minute travel thresholds. The study found inequalities in access within and between cities and proposed redistribution strategies to reduce accessibility gaps. A related Nature News article stated that the findings highlight measurable disparities and are supported by an online visualization tool for comparing cities.

=== Sweden's 1-minute city ===
Started in 2019, as a pilot of mission-oriented innovation led by Vinnova, the Swedish government's innovation agency, a consortium including ArkDes (the Swedish national centre for architecture and design), Lundberg Design, Volvo Cars, Voi, municipalities in Stockholm, Umeå, Gothenburg, Helsingborg, Hultsfred, Härnösand, and Södertälje, led a project called Street Moves, framed explicitly around the idea of the '1-minute city' as noted in Vinnova's mission-oriented innovation 'playbook, Designing Missions. Noting that the 15-minute city is based largely around the provision and organisation of municipal services and infrastructures, via representative modes of urban planning, the Street Moves project explored how the 'one-minute scale of the street outside your front door' could enable more participative modes of engagement, within the broader perspective of 15-minute city models. This one-minute city model can be seen as emphasising qualitative social, cultural, and political aspects of urbanism, in the context of the other chrono-urbanism models described here.

== Implementations ==
=== Asia ===
In 2019, Singapore's Land Transport Authority proposed a master plan that included the goals of "20-minute towns" and a "45-minute city" by 2040.

Israel has embraced the concept of a 15-minute city in new residential developments. According to Orli Ronen, the head of the Urban Innovation and Sustainability Lab at the Porter School for Environmental Studies at Tel Aviv University, Tel Aviv, Haifa, Beersheba, and central Jerusalem have been effective in delivering on the concept at least in part in new developments, but only Tel Aviv has been relatively successful.

Dubai launched the 20-minute city project in 2022, where residents are able to access daily needs & destinations within 20 minutes by foot or bicycle. The plan involves placing 55% of the residents within 800 meters of mass transit stations, allowing them to reach 80% of their daily needs and destinations.

In the Philippine's largest city, the government of Quezon City announced in 2023 its plans to implement the 15-minute city concept to establish a walkable, people-friendly, and sustainable community for its residents. Influenced by the city of Paris, the government aims to make urban development people-centered and to further reach the city's goal of reaching carbon neutrality by 2050.

==== China ====
The 2016 Master Plan for Shanghai called for "15-minute community life circles", where residents could complete all of their daily activities within 15 minutes of walking. The community life circle has been implemented in other Chinese cities, like Baoding and Guangzhou. Xiong'an is also being developed under the 15-minute life circle concept.

The Standard for urban residential area planning and design (GB 50180–2018), a national standard that came into effect in 2018, stipulates four levels of residential areas: 15-min pedestrian-scale neighborhood, 10-min pedestrian-scale neighborhood, 5-min pedestrian-scale neighborhood, and a neighborhood block. Among them, "15-min pedestrian-scale neighborhood" means "residential area divided according to the principle that residents can meet their material, living and cultural demand by walking for 15 minutes; usually surrounded by urban trunk roads or site boundaries, with a population of 50,000 to 100,000 people (about 17,000 to 32,000 households) and complete supporting facilities."

Chengdu, to combat urban sprawl, commissioned the "Great City" plan, where development on the edges of the city would be dense enough to support all necessary services within a 15-minute walk.

=== Europe ===
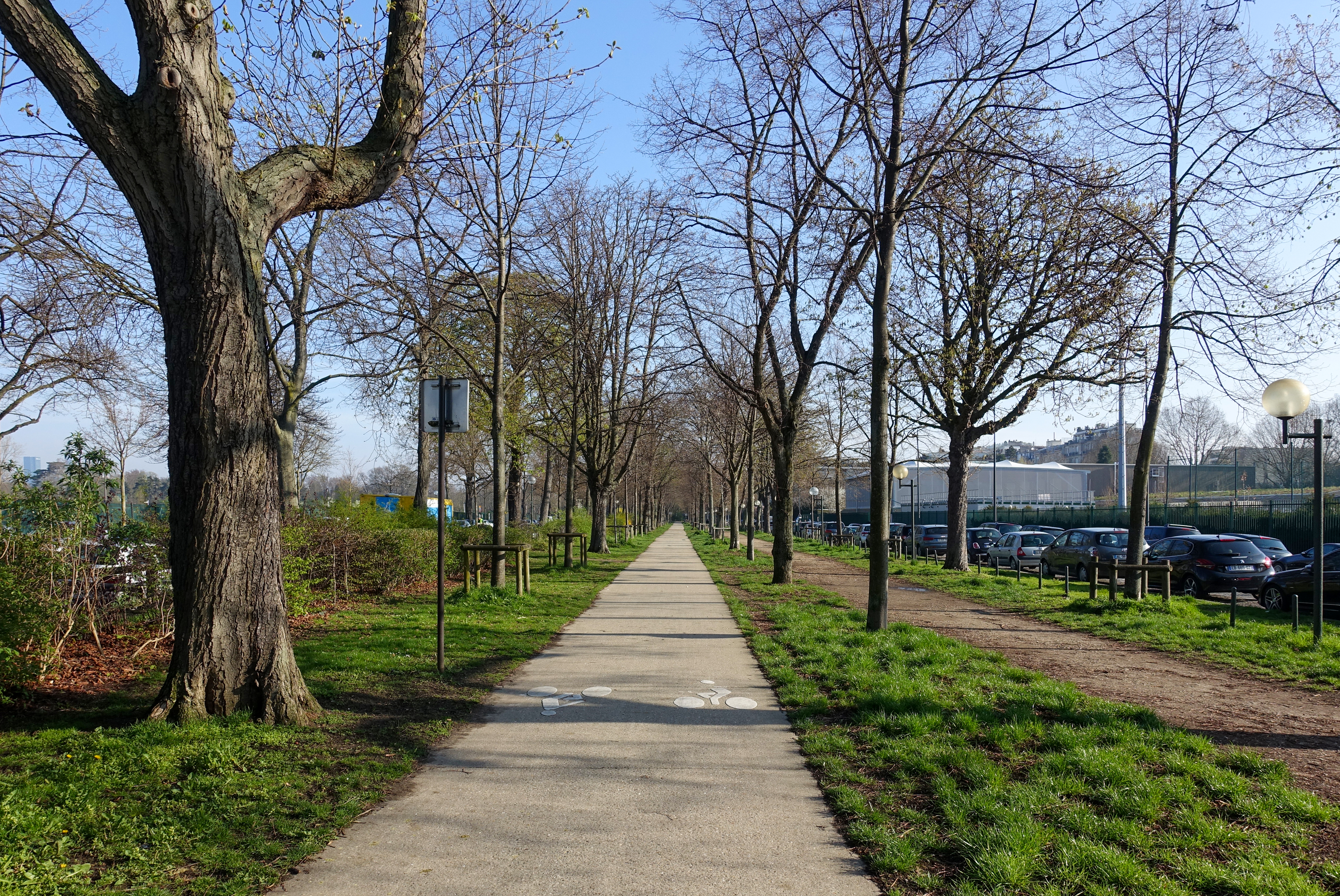
Example of bike lane in Paris

The mayor of Paris, Anne Hidalgo, introduced the 15-minute city concept in her 2020 re-election campaign and began implementing it during the COVID-19 pandemic. For example, school playgrounds were converted to parks after school hours, while the Place de la Bastille and other squares have been revamped with trees and bicycle lanes.

Cagliari, a city on the Italian island of Sardinia, began a strategic plan to revitalize the city and improve walkability. The city actively solicited public feedback through a participatory planning process, as described in the Moreno model. A unique aspect of the plan calls for re-purposing public spaces and buildings that were no longer being used, relating to the general model of urban intensification.

In Utrecht, the fourth-largest city in the Netherlands, 100 percent of residents can reach all city necessities in a 15-minute bike ride, and 94% in a 10-minute bike ride. The local municipality has plans to improve this further by 2040.

In 2023, the Sunak ministry in the United Kingdom announced plans to "protect drivers from over-zealous traffic enforcement", in what it said was "part of a long-term plan to back drivers". These included plans "to stop councils implementing so called '15-minute cities', by consulting on ways to prevent schemes which aggressively restrict where people can drive".

The Polish city Pleszew declares itself to be a 15-minute city.

The Swedish cities of Stockholm, Umeå, Gothenburg, Helsingborg, Hultsfred, Härnösand, and Södertälje were prototypes in the Swedish government-led Street Moves project from 2019-2024, exploring the idea of a '1-minute city', emphasising participative approaches to city-making, within the broader 15-minute city perspective. These prototypes and systems demonstrators, part of broader mission-oriented innovation projects, are documented by Vinnova and ArkDes.

Nordhavn, a neighbourhood in Copenhagen, Denmark was developed according to a five-minute city concept. This is based on all daily amenities being located at a distance of 400 m from the nearest public transit stop – a distance walkable within 5 minutes.

=== North America ===
In 2012, Portland, Oregon, developed a plan for complete neighborhoods within the city, which are aimed at supporting youth, providing affordable housing, and promoting community-driven development and commerce in historically under-served neighborhoods. Similar to the Weng et al. model, the Portland plan emphasizes walking and cycling as ways to increase overall health and stresses the importance of the availability of affordable healthy food. The Portland plan calls for a high degree of transparency and community engagement during the planning process, which is similar to the diversity component of the Moreno et al. model.

In 2015, Kirkland, Washington, developed a "10-Minute Neighborhood Analysis" tool to guide the city's 2035 Comprehensive Plan. This tool is intended to guide community discussion about how the 10-Minute Neighborhood concept can improve livability and explore the policy changes necessary to achieve that vision.

Detroit, Michigan's "20-Minute Neighborhood" initiative was introduced in 2016. The program places the facilities, services, transportation choices, and public resources required for day-to-day living within a 20-minute walk or bicycle ride of residents' homes. The plan's Blue Zones Performance objectives call for residents to live within 20 minutes of a park, high-quality retail, open space, and transit options, and to be free of dilapidated buildings or deteriorating infrastructure within the same walking distance.

=== South America ===
In March 2021, Bogotá, Colombia, implemented 84 kilometers of bike lanes to encourage social distancing during the COVID-19 pandemic. This expansion complemented the Ciclovía practice that originated in Colombia in 1974, where bicycles are given primary control of the streets. The resulting bicycle lane network is the largest of its kind in the world.

The elements of the 15 minute city model can be noticed in current urban conditions instead through a comprehensive policy framework. The citizens at Providencia, a centrally located community in Santiago, usually have access to basic needs like shops, services, public spaces, and transit in short walking or cycling distances. This convenience is supported by mixed use development, relatively high density, and well established public transportation networks. Planning mechanisms which include zoning incentives that can promote public space in return for increased building height, have resulted in a pedestrian-oriented environment. But these conditions do not represent the broader metropolitan area. The city of Santiago is characterized by long commute times and spatial segregation. Income and location factors play a crucial role in determining the access to amenities and opportunities. This contrast indicates wider patterns across Latin American cities where proximity based living is seen only in some places but it is unevenly distributed. Therefore, the case can be used to show how the concept of the 15-minute city can occur organically, but with existing socio-spatial inequalities at the citywide scale.

=== Oceania ===
The city of Melbourne, Australia, developed Plan Melbourne 2017–2050 to accommodate growth and combat sprawl. The plan contains multiple elements of the 15-minute city concept, including the creation of "20-minute neighborhoods".

== Benefits ==
The 15-minute city is an urban design strategy that creates human-scale, people-centered neighborhoods connected by public transportation so that residents may fulfill the majority of daily needs within a short walk or bike ride. It builds on long-standing planning concepts in contrast to traditional zoning, which divides housing from employment and services. The idea helps cities achieve objectives like sustainability, equity, and public health by providing a framework that is adaptable to local requirements. Stronger local economies, enhanced community cohesiveness, better health and welfare, and lower transportation emissions are some of its advantages.

=== Societal effects ===
The 15-minute city, with its emphasis on walkability and accessibility, has been put forward as a way to better serve groups of people that have historically been left out of planning, such as women, children, people with disabilities, people with lived experience of mental illness, and the elderly.

Social infrastructure is also emphasized to maximize urban functions such as schools, parks, and complementary activities for residents. There is also a large focus on access to green space, which may promote positive environmental impacts such as increasing urban biodiversity and helping to protect the city from invasive species. Studies have found that increased access to green spaces can also have a positive impact on the mental and physical health of a city's inhabitants, reducing stress and negative emotions, increasing happiness, improving sleep, and promoting positive social interactions. Urban residents living near green spaces have also been found to exercise more, improving their physical and mental health.

=== Climate change and carbon reduction ===
The 15-minute city has been increasingly recognized as a tool for addressing climate change, particularly through its potential to reduce transportation emissions. Transport accounts for around one-fifth of global carbon dioxide emissions, with road travel responsible for three-quarters of those transport emissions. Passenger vehicles such as cars and buses contribute approximately 45% of all transport-sector carbon dioxide emissions. The IPCC has identified urban infrastructure investment, particularly in walking and transit as one of the most effective strategies for reversing this trend.

== Limitations ==
Scholars have identified several limitations of the 15-minute city concept. According to Pozoukidou and Chatziyiannaki, the 15-minute city may be difficult to implement into already established urban areas, where land use patterns and infrastructure already exist. They also argue that the model may be less feasible in lower-density areas, such as sprawling suburbs, and for lower-income workers who have to commute longer distances.

Noted exceptions include Chengdu, which used the 15-minute city concept to curb sprawl, and Melbourne, where Lord Mayor Sally Capp stressed the importance of public transit in expanding the radius of the 15-minute city.

In a paper published in the journal Sustainability, Georgia Pozoukidou and Zoi Chatziyiannaki argue that while the 15-minute city promotes sustainability and accessibility, the concentration of the amenities and infrastructure is dense, walkable urban cores may increase property values and accelerate gentrification. They warn that without affordable housing policies and equity protection, these planning strategies risk causing lower-income residents to move to peripheral areas, undermining the model's social inclusion goals.

Furthermore, when the concept is applied as a literal spatial analysis research tool, it then refers to the use of an isochrone to express the radius of an area considered local. Isochrones have a long history of use in transportation planning and are constructed primarily using two variables: time and speed. However, Boukouras states that reliance on population-wide conventions, such as gait speed, to estimate the buffer zones of accessible areas may not accurately reflect the mobility capabilities of certain groups, including elderly residents. This may result in potential inaccuracies in research models.

=== Obstacles to implementation ===
In the United States, several factors make the implementation of 15-minute cities challenging. The biggest roadblock is strict zoning regulations, especially single-family zoning which makes high density housing construction illegal. NIMBYism is also an obstacle, as are parking requirements and the perceived low quality of urban schools which causes childbearing couples to move from urban areas to suburban areas.

=== Global challenges ===
There are many researches that pinpoint and discuss several challenges that are associated with the 15-minute city concept. These studies show how the implementation of a 15-minute city can vary notably between different urban contexts, as cities differ in their social, economic, and spatial characteristics. There are also governance challenges, because the model requires organization and strong institutional capacity. Scholars and researchers have also highlighted concerns about social equity, observing that improvements in accessibility may lead to increased property values, which can potentially lead to gentrification and displacement. Researchers have also emphasized the difficulties in measuring accessibility and checking whether cities meet 15-minute criteria.

=== Conspiracy theories ===
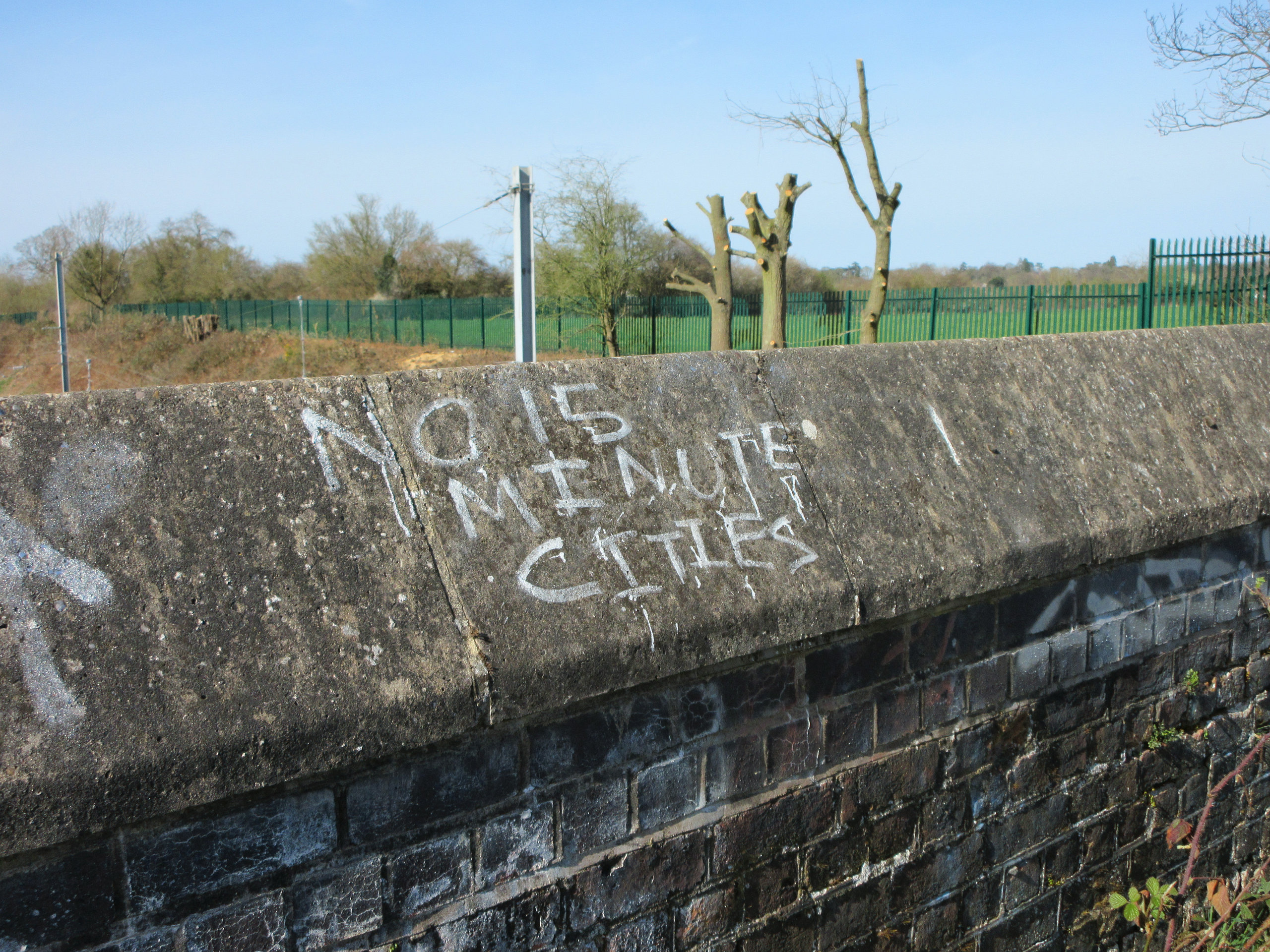
“No 15 minute cities” graffiti in Hertfordshire, England, March 2025

In 2023 conspiracy theories about the 15-minute concept began to flourish, which described the model as an instrument of government oppression. These claims are often part of or linked to other conspiracy theories such as QAnon, anti-vaccine theories or anti-5G misinformation that assert that Western governments seek to oppress their populations. Proponents of the 15-minute concept, including Carlos Moreno, have received death threats.

Some conspiracy theorists conflate the 15-minute concept with the British low-traffic neighbourhood approach, which includes license plate scanners in some implementations. This has led to assertions that the 15-minute model would fine residents for leaving their home districts, or that it would confine people in "open-air prisons". Conspiracy theorists believe the World Economic Forum (WEF) wants to lock people in their homes on the pretext of climate change. Such beliefs are part of a larger network of conspiracy theories surrounding the concept of a "Great Reset".

In a 2023 protest by some 2,000 demonstrators in Oxford, signs described 15-minute cities as "ghettos" and an instrument of "tyrannical control" by the WEF. Canadian media commentator Jordan Peterson has described 15-minute cities as a "perversion". QAnon supporters have claimed a February 2023 derailment of a train carrying hazardous chemicals in Ohio was part of a deliberate plot to force rural residents into 15-minute cities to restrict their personal freedom. Similar claims have been made about wildfires on the island of Maui in August 2023.

In 2023, the British Conservative government began to criticise the idea by name. In February 2023 the Conservative MP Nick Fletcher called 15-minute cities an "international socialist concept" during a debate in the UK Parliament, which was met with laughter. At the Conservative party conference in October 2023, Transport Secretary Mark Harper announced that he was "calling time on the misuse of so-called '15-minute cities'", criticising as "sinister" the idea that local councils could "decide how often you go to the shops and that they ration who uses the roads and when". No such powers have been proposed as part of the 15-minute city concept in the United Kingdom. Despite being specifically debunked in a guide given to MPs by the Leader of the House of Commons in 2024, Health Secretary Maria Caulfield included the fiction in a local election leaflet and reiterated it in a BBC interview.

The rhetoric of 15-minute city conspiracy advocates has been described as "undermining state institutions and eroding public trust".

== See also ==
- Accessibility (transport) – Measure of ease of reaching a destination
- Aging in place – Ability to live in one's home and community safely and independently regardless of age
- Active living – Physically active way of life
- Automotive city – Urban planning prioritising automobiles
- Bicycle-friendly – Urban planning prioritising cycling
- Carfree city – Urban area absent of motor vehicles
- Co-benefits of climate change mitigation – Positive secondary effects that occur from climate mitigation and adaptation measures
- Compact city – High density mixed use transit oriented planning
- Cyclability – Degree of ease of cycling
- Fused grid – Type of urban planning design that aims to reconcile the urban grid and Radburn design housing
- Marchetti's constant – Average commuting time
- Mixed-use development – Type of urban development strategy
- Most livable cities
- Obesity and walking
- Participatory budgeting – Democratic financial decision-making process
- Right to mobility – Right to move in a safe, accessible, equitable and sustainable manner
- School street – Pedestrian street in front of a school
- Smart city – City using integrated information and communication technology
- Social influences on fitness behavior – Effect on physical activity
- Street reclamation – Changing streets to focus on non-car use
- Transport divide – Unequal access to transport
- Urban density – Number of people inhabiting a given urbanized area
- Urban village – Decentralized urban development
- Urban vitality – Intensity of use of an urban area
- Walkable city – City design that prioritizes pedestrians
