= Abdul Aziz Khandaker =

Bangladeshi politician

Member of Bangladesh Parliament
- In office 1973–1976

Personal details
- Political party: Awami League

Abdul Aziz Khandaker (1923–1991) (Bengali: আবদুল আজিজ খন্দকার) was an Awami League politician and a member of parliament for Patuakhali-6.

== Career ==
Khandaker was elected to parliament from Patuakhali-6 as an Awami League candidate in 1973.
