= Khondaker Nurjahan Yesmin Bulbul =

Bangladeshi politician

Member of Bangladesh Parliament
- In office 2005–2006

Personal details
- Born: 1945
- Died: 30 November 2020 (aged 74–75)
- Party: Bangladesh Nationalist Party

Khondaker Nurjahan Yesmin Bulbul is a Bangladesh Nationalist Party politician and a former member of the Bangladesh Parliament from a reserved seat.

== Career ==
Bulbul was elected to parliament from reserved seat as a Bangladesh Nationalist Party candidate in 2005.
