= Rudrapur, Bangladesh =

Village in northern Bangladesh

Rudrapur is a village in northern Bangladesh. It is located in Biral Upazila in the Dinajpur District. About 370 km by road from Dhaka, it is close to the town of Dinajpur, not very far from the Indian border. The award-winning METI Handmade School is in Rudrapur.

== See also ==
- List of villages in Bangladesh
