= Elahi (name) =

- Pronunciation: /ɪlˈɑːhiː/
- Gender: Male

Origin
- Origin: Aramaic
- Meaning: "My god"
- Region of origin: Syria

Elahi (אֱלָהִי) is an Aramaic word meaning "My God". It is used as a Muslim name in Bangladesh, Pakistan, India, and Iran.

== Surname ==
=== Elahi family (Punjab, Pakistan) ===
- Muhammad Zain Elahi (born 1987) - Pakistani politician
- Chaudhry Hussain Elahi - Pakistani politician
- Moonis Elahi (born 1976) - Pakistani politician
- Chaudhry Musa Elahi - Member of the Provincial Assembly of Punjab from Gujrat (2024–2029)
- Chaudhry Zahoor Elahi (1917 - 1981) - Pakistani politician
- Parvez Elahi (born 1945) - 19th chief minister of Punjab
- Fazal Elahi Chaudhry (1904 - 1982) - President of Pakistan from 1973 to 1978
- Shehzad Ata Elahi - Pakistani attorney general

=== Elahi family (Pakistan) ===
- Zahoor Elahi (born 1971) - Pakistani cricket coach and former cricketer
- Saleem Elahi (born 1976) - Pakistani cricketer
- Manzoor Elahi (born 1963) - Pakistani cricketer

=== Elahi family (Pakistan) ===
- Anwar Elahi (1936/1937 - 2016) - Pakistani cricketer
- Ikram Elahi (born 1933) - Pakistani cricketer

=== Others ===
- Fazle Elahi (1955/1956 - 2018) - Bangladeshi freedom fighter and politician
- Sheikh Manzoor Elahi - Pakistani politician
- Mohammed-Arif Elahi (1935-?) - Pakistani tennis player
- Armaghan Elahi - Pakistani cricketer
- Irfan Elahi (born 1995) - Pakistani
- Shahzad Elahi (born 1965) - Pakistani politician
- Ishtiaq Elahi (born 1998) - Indian cricketer
- Sadreddin Elahi (1934 – 2021) - Iranian journalist
- Amir Elahi (1908 - 1980) - Indian cricketer
- Syed Manzur Elahi (1942 – 2025) - Bangladeshi businessperson and chairman
- Nur Ali Elahi (1895 - 1974) - Iranian philosopher, judge and musician
- Qamre Elahi (born 1961) - West Bengali politician
- Bijan Elahi (1945 - 2010) - Iranian poet and translator

== Middle name ==
- Aashiq Elahi Meerthi (1881 - 1941) - Islamic scholar, biographer, translator and writer
- Fazal Elahi Khan - Pakistani politician
- Karam Elahi Bandial (born 1961) - Pakistani politician
- Quadrat Elahi Rahman Shafique (1962 - 2009) - Colonel in the Bangladesh Army
- Ashiq Elahi Bulandshahri (1925 - 2002) - Indian Islamic scholar
- Hossein Elahi Ghomshei (born 1940) - Iranian scholar
- Fazle Elahi Akbar (born 1952) - Bangladeshi general
- Md. Mahabub Elahi Ronju (born 1952) - Bangladeshi freedom fighter
- Tawfiq-e-Elahi Chowdhury - Bangladeshi energy advisor
- Ehsan Elahi Zaheer (1945–1987) - Pakistani Islamic scholar and author
- Fazal Elahi Chaudhry (1904 - 1982) - President of Pakistan from 1973 to 1978
- Daniel Elahi Galán (born 1996) - Colombian tennis player

== Given name ==
- Elahi Bux Soomro (1926–2024) - Pakistani politician
- Elahi Ardabili (?-1543) - Iranian author and scholar
- Elahi Hamadani - Mughal poet

== See also ==
- Elahi
