= Elahi (disambiguation) =

Elahi is Aramaic and literally means "My God."

Elahi may refer to:

- Elahi (name), most commonly a surname, and sometimes a middle name or a given name.

== Places ==
- Choqa Elahi, a village in Kermanshah Province, Iran.
- Gheyb-e Elahi, a village in Fars Province, Iran.

== See also ==
- Elah (disambiguation)
- Illah (disambiguation)
- Ilah, an Arabic word for God
- "Ilahi", a song from the 2013 Indian film Yeh Jawaani Hai Deewani
- Allahi, a village in Razavi Khorasan, Iran
