= Illa =

Illa may refer to:

- Illa, France
- Illa (Arabic), a negative Arabic word
- Illa (surname), a surname
- Independent Labor League of America, an American communist movement
- Illa (moth) a geometrid moth in the tribe Nacophorini
- Illa a synonym for the fly genus Solomonilla

== See also ==
- Alla (disambiguation)
- Ila (disambiguation)
- Illah (disambiguation)
