= Illah (disambiguation) =

Illah is a town in Delta State, Nigeria on the west bank of the River Niger.

Illah may also refer to:

- Al-Mu’id li-Din Illah (died 1030), Yemeni imam
- Illah, Khuzestan, Iran
- ʿillah, or effective cause, used in the Islamic legal practice of qiyas

== See also ==
- Allah (disambiguation)
- Ilah
- Illa (disambiguation)
- Illahe
- Elah (disambiguation)
- Elahi (disambiguation)
- "Ilahi", a song from the 2013 Indian film Yeh Jawaani Hai Deewani
