= Elah =

Elah may refer to:

- Elah (Edom), the name of an Edomite clan
- Elah, a name of God in Judaism
- Elah, the father of Hoshea, the last king of the Israelite Kingdom of Israel
- King Elah, the fourth king of Israel
- Valley of Elah, where the biblical David fought Goliath
- Elah, Hebrew word for "terebinth"
- Elah Terrell, an American architect
- ELAH, the hydrochloride salt of antimicrobial compound ethyl lauroyl arginate

== See also ==
- Allah, the Arabic word for God
- El (disambiguation)
- Elahi (disambiguation)
- Illah (disambiguation)
- In the Valley of Elah, a 2007 film
