= Forced circumcision =

Circumcision performed without consent

Forced circumcision is the circumcision of men and boys against their will. In a biblical context, the term is used especially in relation to Paul the Apostle and his polemics against the circumcision controversy in early Christianity. Forced circumcisions have occurred in a wide range of situations, most notably in the forced conversion of gentiles to Judaism, the compulsory conversion of non-Muslims to Islam and the forced circumcision of Teso, Turkana and Luo men in Kenya, as well as the abduction of South African teenage boys to so-called circumcision schools ("bush schools"). In South Africa, custom allows uncircumcised Xhosa-speaking men past the age of circumcision (i.e., 25 years or older) to be overpowered by other men and forcibly circumcised.

== History and contemporary forced circumcision ==
=== Hasmonean Kingdom (140 BCE–37 BCE) ===
1 Maccabees relates the story of how Mattathias (ca. 166 BC) forcibly circumcised the sons of Jewish parents who had abandoned the rite. Forced circumcision of Gentiles by Jews is attested from the second century BC onwards. In 125 BC John Hyrcanus conquered Edom, which the Romans called Idumea; and the Idumeans were forcibly converted to Judaism, by threat of exile or death, depending on the source. As reported by Josephus, circumcision was required of the Idumeans:

Hyrcanus took also Dora and Marissa, cities of Idumea, and subdued all the Idumeans; and permitted them to stay in that country, if they would circumcise their genitals, and make use of the laws of the Jews; and they were so desirous of living in the country of their forefathers, that they submitted to the use of circumcision, and the rest of the Jewish ways of living; at which time therefore this befell them, that they were hereafter no other than Jews.

Scholars disagree on the interpretation of the sources. For example, Steven Weitzman believes the Idumeans were forcibly circumcised for political, not religious, reasons. According to Shaye J. D. Cohen, "Ptolemy's claim, that the Idumaeans were compelled to be circumcised and to adopt Jewish ways, is a simplified account of what these urban Idumaeans experienced." During the short reign of Hyrcanus' eldest son, Aristobulus I (104–103 BC), the Hasmoneans gained control of Galilee. In this case, too, sources indicate that the residents were subjected to forced circumcision. Archaeological evidence suggests that, during this period, Gentiles fled from Galilee to avoid being forcibly circumcised. Recently, Isaac Soon has argued that 1 Macc 2:46 does not refer to circumcision "by force" but that Mattathias circumcised "in strength". He argues that Mattathias did not forcibly circumcise, but instead re-established circumcision among Jewish inhabitants of Judea "in strength".

=== Roman Empire ===
Greeks and Romans regarded circumcision as a mutilation of the male genitalia, but the practice is little discussed in Roman literary sources until the second century of the Christian era. There was a circumcision controversy in Early Christianity but this was resolved at the Council of Jerusalem c.50 which made it clear that circumcision of gentile converts to Christianity was not required. Josephus (who changed his allegiance from the Jews to the Roman Flavians) reports that two Roman officers who had taken refuge with Galileans during the war with Rome (early 67 AD) were put under pressure to convert to Judaism. Josephus, declaring that "every one should worship God in accordance with the dictates of his own conscience," claims to have saved the two Gentiles from forced circumcision. After the First Roman-Jewish War, a head tax, the Fiscus Judaicus, was levied against all Jews. According to Suetonius, Domitian (c.90) also applied this tax to those who were circumcised, even if they claimed they were not Jews. Titus Flavius Clemens was put to death in 95 for adopting Jewish customs. In 96 Nerva relaxed the Jewish tax as applying only to those who professed to be Jews. Sometime between 128 and 132 AD, the emperor Hadrian seems to have temporarily banned circumcision, on pain of death. Antoninus Pius exempted Jews from the ban, as well as Egyptian priests, and Origen (d. ca. 253) says that in his time only Jews were permitted to practice circumcision. Legislation under Constantine, the first Christian emperor, freed any slave who was subjected to circumcision; in the year 339, circumcising a slave became punishable by death.

Although Greco-Roman writers view circumcision as an identifying characteristic of Jews, they believed the practice to have originated in Egypt, and recorded it among peoples they identified as Arab, Syrian, Phoenician, Colchian, and Ethiopian; circumcision was a marker of "the Other". Diaspora Jews might circumcise their male slaves as well as adult male converts and Jewish male infants. According to Catherine Hezser, it is an open question whether Jews of late antiquity refrained from forcibly circumcising their Gentile slaves and whether Romans avoided selling their slaves to Jews in reaction to the prohibition. The Mishnah (compiled about 200 AD) is silent on this point, whereas the Mekhilta de-Rabbi Ishmael (written at the end of the fourth century or later) suggests that Jews might indeed possess uncircumcised slaves.

=== Asia and North Africa ===
Forced conversions, involving forced circumcision, are echoed in a vast body of scholarly literature spanning the entire history of Islam. Scholars conclude that, during the Islamic conquest of the Middle East and North Africa, forced conversion to Islam through violence or threat of violence did not play a key role. However, taxes and regulations requiring the holders of prestigious positions to become Muslims have been regarded as a form of forced conversion.

==== South Asia ====
In the aftermath of the 1780 Battle of Pollilur, roughly 200 British prisoners of war were imprisoned by Hyder Ali in the fortress of Seringapatnam. Many of the prisoners of war were forcibly circumcised in Mysorean captivity. Cromwell Massey, who kept a secret diary during his captivity, wrote: "I lost with the foreskin of my yard all those benefits of a Christian and Englishman which were and ever shall be my greatest glory." Adolescent captives were, in addition to being circumcised, made to wear female clothes. James Bristow, a teenage artilleryman, revenged himself by circumcising dogs, believing that this would harm the religious feelings of the Muslim warders. The prospect of punishment did not deter him, because "compelling us to undergo an abhorred operation [was] so base and barbarous an act of aggression, that it was impossible to reflect on it with temper." James Scurry, also a prisoner of war, confirms in his book, The Captivity, Sufferings, and Escape of James Scurry (1824), that British POWs, Mangalorean Catholics, and other prisoners were forcibly circumcised. In 1784, when Tipu returned from Mangalore, he brought back tens of thousands of Mangalorean Catholics from Kanara and subjected them to forced circumcision.

According to Kativa Daiya, during the 1947 partition of India "[f]orced circumcision, shaving facial and head hair (for Sikh men), and shaving off the Hindu Brahmin's traditional, short, plaited hair (on an otherwise bald head) were routine Muslim conversion tactics for men and boys." Asia News reported in 2004 that the Justice and Peace Commission of Lahor spoke out against young non-Muslim men in Pakistan being converted and circumcised against their will. In 2005, the Gulf Times discussed a case of forced circumcision of Nepalese boys in Mumbai in the context of sex trade in large Indian cities.

==== Iraq ====
Iraqi Mandaeans, residing almost exclusively in Baghdad and Basra, do not circumcise. However, their religious sensitivity on this issue has not prevented hostile rulers from subjecting Mandaean men and boys to forced circumcision. Mandaean communities, especially after the invasion of Iraq, have been subject to "murder, kidnapping, rape, forced conversion, forced circumcision and destruction of religious property."

In Iraq in 2003, shortly after the fall of the Saddam regime, the 35 families who made up the Mandean community in Falluja were ordered at gunpoint to adopt Islam; the men were forcibly circumcised.

In 2007, the US Committee on International Religious Freedom heard testimony reporting: "Forced conversion is happening in an alarming degree. Boys are being kidnapped, forcibly circumcised—a major sin in the Mandaean religion—and forcibly converted to Islam."

In 2014, after the exodus of the Christians from Mosul and the Yazidis from Mount Sinjar, it was reported that forced circumcisions taking place were conducted by the Islamic State.

==== Anatolia ====
===== The Ottoman Empire =====
There are even accounts of Christian boys being abducted and forcibly circumcised in the nineteenth century. In 1829, nine-year-old Greek boy Alexandros Kitos and other young boys were kidnapped by Ottoman soldiers and sold into slavery in Egypt; all of them were circumcised against their will.

It is well established that, both before and during the Armenian genocide, forced conversions (involving forced circumcisions) of Armenian boys and men were frequent. "In many cases, young Armenian children were spared from deportation by local Turks who took them from their families. The children were coerced into denouncing Christianity and becoming Muslims, and were then given new Turkish names. For Armenian boys, the forced conversion meant they each had to endure painful circumcision as required by Islamic custom."

==== Turkey ====
During the Istanbul Pogrom in September 1955, "many Greek men, including at least one priest, were subjected to forced circumcision." As a result of the pogrom, the Greek minority eventually emigrated from Turkey. In 2002, there was a report that non-Muslim army recruits in Turkey had been threatened with forced circumcision. Cases are documented where Syro-Orthodox men serving in the Turkish military forces have been threatened with forced circumcision. In 1991, a young Christian Turk, fleeing from forced circumcision in the Turkish military forces, was granted asylum in Germany.

The Yazidi (not all of whom are circumcised) in Turkey have for years been subjected to direct state persecution, including compulsory religious instruction at school, forced conversion, forced circumcision, and mistreatment during military service. In 1999, there was a report of the forced circumcision of Yedizi men in Turkish Kurdistan.

==== The Arab world ====
John Rawlins had sailed for 23 years without incident when, in 1621, he and his crew were kidnapped by pirates from the Barbary Coast of North Africa. Rawlins later reported that, after being taken to Algiers, two younger men were "by force and torment ... compelled ... to turn Turks," which means that they were forcibly circumcised. By organizing a successful mutiny, he was able to return home in 1622. The Portuguese Friar Jaono dos Sanctos claimed that, annually in Algiers in the 1620s, more than nine hundred Christian slaves were converted to Islam, "besides about fifty boys yearly circumcised against their wills."

==== Indonesia ====
===== Maluku Islands =====
Thousands of Christians were forcibly circumcised in the Moluccas to convert them forcibly to Islam from December 1999 to January 2001. The Sydney Morning Herald reported in detail on this, stating that "almost all" of 3,928 villagers forced to convert to Islam were circumcised. Razors and knives were reused, causing infections. One of those circumcised, Kostantinus Idi, reported: "I could not escape ... One of them held up my foreskin between pieces of wood while another cut me with a razor ... the third man held my head back, ready to pour water down my throat if I screamed. But I couldn't help but scream and he poured the water. I kept screaming aloud and vomited. I couldn't stand the pain." He further reported that one of the clerics urinated on his wound, saying it would stop infection. The Sydney Morning Herald reported that the forced conversions and forced circumcisions had been condemned by moderate Muslim leaders who said they were contrary to Islamic teachings. The local governor had also investigated the incidents.

=== Africa south of the Sahara ===
==== Ethiopia ====
Marco Polo, in his Travels, relates how a Christian king of Ethiopia took revenge on the Sultan of Aden, who had forcibly circumcised a bishop.

==== Kenya ====
In Kenya, most tribes circumcise. Luo men from Western Kenya are a significant exception, for which reason they have regularly been subjected to forced circumcision. In August 2002, following a violent incident in Butere/Mumias District, a district commissioner instructed the police to "crack down on traditional surgeons involved in forcible circumcision."

In November 2005, the Kenyan Human Rights Commission announced that it would seek prosecutions against politicians for inciting such violence. In one instance, a cabinet minister had said, "Those who are not circumcised should be taken for a circumcision ceremony." The Commission said this amounted to an incitement to violence.

In late January 2008, a disputed election in which circumcision became an issue between President Mwai Kibaki, a Kikuyu and opposition candidate Raila Odinga, a Luo, "the fact that Odinga was uncircumcised became an issue: He was seen by some Kikuyus as a 'child' unfit to rule because he had not passed through circumcision and initiation." Post-election violence reportedly "focused on tribal animosities", and included several cases of forced circumcision. AFP reported one Kenyan man's experience: "A group of eight men with pangas (machetes) entered. They asked for my ID [to determine what tribe he belonged to] They slashed me and they circumcised me by force. I screamed a lot and cried for help..." He complained that police left him in a pool of blood, taking weapons left behind by the Kikuyu gang.

In September 2010, at Malaba, West Kenya, a 21-year-old Teso man was lured to a hotel, drugged, smeared with fermented millet flour and was being led away by several Bukusu to be circumcised when the police intervened. The Teso man, who agreed to a medical circumcision, condemned the Bukusu youths for trying to impose their culture on the Teso. Three weeks previously, village neighbours in Aedomoru sub location in Teso north armed themselves with clubs and prevented a 35-year-old man from being forcibly circumcised.

==== South Africa ====
In 1999, a woman who was feared throughout the Vaal Triangle district of South Africa, controlled a gang of kidnappers that abducted young people, forcibly circumcising the boys and extorting ransoms from their parents for their release. A local police officer said as many as 10 teenagers had been snatched every day.

In 2004, a 22-year-old Rastafari convert was seized by relatives and forcibly circumcised by group of Xhosa tribal elders and relatives.

In December 2004, 45-year-old Nceba Cekiso was caught and circumcised against his will. The report in the Cape Argus noted,

Xhosa culture allows people to forcibly circumcise boys deemed to be past the age of initiation... Forcing people do undergo the ancient ritual ... has, in recent times, caused concern among human rights organisations... (In) one instance two Rastafarians objected to the procedure on religious grounds. The incident has sparked a debate on whether or not traditionalists should still be allowed to force people against their will into the bush to undergo initiation.

Despite being medically circumcised, a Christian Xhosa was forcibly recircumcised by his father and community leaders in 2007. He laid a charge of unfair discrimination on the grounds of his religious beliefs, seeking an apology from his father and the Congress of Traditional Leaders of South Africa. In the settlement that was reached, and which was made an order of the Equality Court, the Congress of Traditional Leaders accepted the right of adult males to choose whether to attend traditional circumcision schools according to their religious beliefs. It apologised for the comments made by its former chairman encouraging the ostracism of teenagers who refused to undergo traditional circumcision. The judge declared, "What is important in terms of the Constitution and law is that no one can be forced to submit to circumcision without his consent."

According to South African newspapers, the subsequent trial became "a landmark case around forced circumcision". In October 2009, the Bhisho Equality Court (High Court) ruled that, in South Africa, circumcision is unlawful unless done with the full consent of the initiate. According to Thembela Kepe, traditional leaders allege that the ban on forced circumcision is "a violation of cultural rights enshrined in the Constitution."

==== Sudan ====
There is ample evidence that, for years, Christians of Khartoum and elsewhere in Sudan have been forcefully converted to Islam, and that Christian men and boys have been forcibly circumcised. Examples of Dinka boys having been forcibly circumcised in the 1990s and 2000s are known from the context of traditional slavery, still endemic in Sudan.

==== Uganda ====
In 1885, Kabaka Mwanga ordered the murders of Bishop James Hannington and many local Christians. During the following period, Islamization led to several Christians being forcibly circumcised.

As discussed by anthropologist Suzette Heald and other scholars, the Gisu (alternatively, Bagishu) of Uganda "take pride in not tolerating uncircumcised men." For this reason, in Gisu society, any boy or man who has been able to escape ritual circumcision (called "imbalu") faces the prospect of being forcibly circumcised. Voice of America, referring to the same practice, reports: "Among the Bagishu, uncircumcised men are treated with contempt; they are not allowed in society and in most cases they are seen as failing to get local women for marriage. This is supported by all the Bagishu including women who often report uncircumcised men to tribal elders. It's considered traditional that no male is to escape the ritual regardless of where he lives, what he does or what kind of security he has."

In 2004, a father of seven was seized and forcibly circumcised after his wife told Bagishu tribal circumcisers that he was uncircumcised. A local official said the authorities could not intervene in a cultural ritual. Other forced circumcisions occurred in September 2006 and June 2008. In all these cases, family members of the victims approved of the forced circumcision. Other tribal groups in Uganda and the Ugandan Foundation for Human Rights Initiative regard forced circumcision as a human rights abuse. The Ugandan Government and the President of the Ugandan Law Society condemned the incident, but the victim refused to press charges.

=== Australia ===
Traditional circumcision is still practised in some tribal areas of Australia. Linguist and anthropologist Peter Sutton, commenting on forced circumcision and the absence of law enforcement in remote settlements, claims that Australian law has been applied in a patchy way: "Involuntary circumcision has long been widely accepted as being de facto outside the scope of Australian law." Late in 1996, 34-year-old Irwin Brookdale was drinking with a group of Australian Aboriginals on the banks of a river in far north Queensland. After he passed out, a woman in the group felt down his pants, found that he was not circumcised and called on her companions to "make a man out of him". They attempted to circumcise him with a broken beer bottle. Brookdale ended up in hospital, one of his assailants was convicted of unlawful wounding and Brookdale was awarded A$10,000 compensation for nervous shock.

=== Other geographical areas ===
==== Breakup of Yugoslavia ====
According to Milica Z. Bookman, the breakup of Yugoslavia "was extremely violent, producing some two million refugees, over 100,000 killed, and evidence of gang rape, impaling, dismemberment and forced circumcision."

The US Department of State reported that an American surgeon in Bosnia for two weeks alleged that irregular Muslim and Mujahedin troops "had routinely performed crude, disfiguring, nonmedical circumcisions on Bosnian Serb soldiers." One 18-year-old Bosnian Serb soldier was reportedly "so brutally circumcised that eventually the entire organ required amputation."

== See also ==
- Children's rights
- Ethics of circumcision
- Female genital mutilation
- Forced conversion
- Religious intolerance

== Sources ==
- Jacob J. Akol, Burden of Nationality: Memoirs of an African Aidworker/Journalist, 1970s-1990s (Nairobi: Kenya Paulines Publication, 2006).
- Michael Bobelian, Children of Armenia: A Forgotten Genocide and the Century-long Struggle for Justice (New York: Simon & Schuster, 2009).
- Milica Z. Bookman, "War and Peace: The Divergent Breakups of Yugoslavia and Czechoslovakia," Journal of Peace Research, vol. 31 (1994), pp. 175–187.
- Lewin B. Bowring, Haidar Ali and Tipu Sultan, and the Struggle with the Musalman Powers of the South (Oxford: Clarendon Press, 1893).
- Jorunn Jacobsen Buckley, The Great Stem of Souls: Reconstructing Mandaean History (Piscataway, New Jersey: Gorgias Press, 2006).
- Jean-Yves Carlier, Who Is a Refugee? A Comparative Case Law Study (The Hague: Kluwer Law International, 1997).
- James H. Charlesworth, "Why Evaluate Twenty-five Years of Jesus Research?" in: James H. Charlesworth, Petr Pokorný, eds, Jesus Research: An International Perspective (Proceedings of the Biennial Princeton-Prague Symposium on the Current State of Studies on the Historical Jesus; Grand Rapids, Michigan: Wm B. Eerdmans Publishing, 2009), pp. 1–15.
- William Gervase Clarence-Smith, Islam and the Abolition of Slavery (New York: Oxford University Press. 2006).
- Shaye J. D. Cohen, "Religion, Ethnicity, and Hellenism in the Emergence of Jewish Identity in Maccabean Palestine", in: Per Bilde, Troels Engberg-Pedersen, Lise Hannestad, Jan Zahle, eds, Religion and Religious Practice in the Seleucid Kingdom (Studies in Hellenistic Civilization; Aarhus: Aarhus University Press, 1990), pp. 204–223.
- Shaye J. D. Cohen, The Beginnings of Jewishness: Boundaries, Varieties, Uncertainties (Berkeley, Los Angeles, London: University of California Press, 1999).
- Linda Colley, Captives: The Story of Britain's Pursuit of Empire and How Its Soldiers and Sailors Were Held Captive by the Dream of Global Supremacy, 1600-1850 (New York: Pantheon, 2002).
- I. P. Crowley, K. M. Kesner, "Ritual Circumcision (Umkhwetha) amongst the Xhosa of the Ciskei," British Journal of Urology, vol. 66 (1990), pp. 318–321.
- Kativa Daiya, Violent Belongings: Partition, Gender, and National Culture in Postcolonial India (Philadelphia: Temple University Press, 2008).
- Robert J. L. Darby, A Surgical Temptation: The Demonization of the Foreskin and the Rise of Circumcision in Britain (Chicago: University of Chicago Press, 2005).
- Robert C. Davis, Christian Slaves, Muslim Masters: White Slavery in the Mediterranean, the Barbary Coast and Italy, 1500-1800 (New York: Palgrave Macmillan, 2003).
- Margo DeMello, Encyclopedia of Body Adornment (Westport, Connecticut: Greenwood Press, 2007).
- Thomas DiPiero, White Men Aren't (Durham: Duke University Press, 2002).
- Terence L. Donaldson, Paul and the Gentiles: Remapping the Apostle's Convictional World (Minneapolis, Minnesota: Fortress Press: 1997).
- James D. G. Dunn, Paul and the Mosaic Law (Wissenschaftliche Untersuchungen zum Neuen Testament, vol. 89; Tübingen: J. C. B. Mohr [Paul Siebeck], 1996).
- Claudine Fabre-Vassas, The Singular Beast: Jews, Christians, and the Pig (trans. Carol Volk; New York: Columbia University Press, 1997).
- David A. Fiensy, New Testament Introduction (The College Press NIV Commentary; Joplin, Montana: College Press Publishing Company, 1997).
- Reuven Firestone, An Introduction to Islam for Jews (Philadelphia: Jewish Publication Society, 2008).
- Mary C. Fuller, "John Rawlins," in: Ivo Kamps, Jyotsna G. Singh, eds, Travel Knowledge: European "Discoveries" in the Early Modern Period (New York: Palgrave Press, 2001), p. 60.
- Lumpka Sheila Funani, Circumcision among the Ama-Xhosa: A Medical Investigation (Braamfontein: Skotaville Publishers, 1990).
- Michael Glass, "Forced circumcision of men (abridged)" Journal of Medical Ethics (J Med Ethics doi:10.1136/medethics-2013-101626) September 2013,
- Jack Glazier, Land and the Uses of Tradition among the Mbeere of Kenya (Lanham, Maryland: University Press of America, 1985).
- Martin Goodman, "Galilean Judaism and Judaean Judaism," in: William Horbury, W. D. Davies, John Sturdy, eds, The Cambridge History of Judaism: Volume 3 – The Early Roman Period (Cambridge: Cambridge University Press, 1999), pp. 596–617.
- Alan Harding, England in the Thirteenth Century (Cambridge Medieval Textbooks; New York: Cambridge University Press, 1993).
- Suzette Heald, Manhood and Morality: Sex, Violence, and Ritual in Gisu Society (London and New York: Routledge, 1999).
- Catherine Hezser, Jewish Slavery in Antiquity (New York and Oxford: Oxford University Press, 2005).
- Catherine Hezser, "Slaves and Slavery in Rabbinic and Roman Law," in: Catherine Hezser, ed., Rabbinic Law in its Roman and Near Eastern Context (Tübingen: J. C. B. Mohr [Paul Siebeck], 2003), pp. 133–176.
- R. Po-Chia Hsia, Trent 1475: Stories of a Ritual Murder Trial (New Haven: Yale University Press, 1992).
- Wadie Jwaideh, The Kurdish National Movement: Its Origins and Development (Syracuse, New York: Syracuse University Press, 2006).
- Peter Kagwanja, "Courting genocide: Populism, ethno-nationalism and the informalisation of violence in Kenya's 2008 post-election crisis," Journal of Contemporary African Studies, vol. 27 (2009), pp. 365–387.
- Joseph Karimi, Philip Ochieng, The Kenyatta Succession (Nairobi: Transafrica. 1980).
- Thembela Kepe, "'Secrets' that kill: Crisis, custodianship and responsibility in ritual male circumcision in the Eastern Cape Province, South Africa," Social Science and Medicine, vol. 70 (2010), pp. 729–735.
- Evan Kohlmann, Al-Qaida's Jihad in Europe: The Afghan-Bosnian Network (Oxford and New York: Oxford International Publishers, 2004).
- A. W. Lawrence, Captives of Tipu: Survivors' Narratives (London: Jonathan Cape, 1929).
- Natan Lerner, Religion, Secular Beliefs, and Human Rights: 25 Years after the 1981 Declaration (Studies in Religion, Secular Beliefs, and Human Rights, 2; Leiden: Brill, 2006).
- Amnon Linder, The Jews in Roman Imperial Legislation (Detroit, Michigan: Wayne State University Press, 1987).
- V. D. Lipman, The Jews of Medieval Norwich (London: Jewish Historical Society of England, 1967).
- Edward P. Lipton, Religious Freedom in Asia (New York: Nova Science Publishers, 2002).
- Richard Lobban, "Slavery in the Sudan since 1989," Arab Studies Quarterly, vol. 23 (2001), no. 2, pp. 31–39.
- Edmondo Lupieri, The Mandaeans: The Last Gnostics (Italian Texts and Studies on Religion; Grand Rapids, Michigan: Wm B. Eerdmans Publishing, 2001).
- V. Mayatula, T. R. Mavundla, "A review on male circumcision procedures among South African blacks," Curationis, vol. 20 (1997), pp. 16–20.
- Graeme Meintjies, Manhood at a Price: Socio-Medical Perspectives on Xhosa Traditional Circumcision—Volume 1 (Institute of Social and Economic Research; Grahamstown: Rhodes University, 1998).
- Amalendu Misra, Identity and Religion: Foundations of Anti-Islamism in India (New Delhi: Sage Publications, 2004).
- M. S. Naravane, Battles of the Honourable East India Company: Making of the Raj (New Delhi: A. P. H. Publishing Corporation, 2006).
- Lilian N. Ndangam, "'Lifting the Cloak on Manhood': Coverage of Xhosa Male Circumcision in the South African Press," in: Egodi Uchendu, ed., Masculinities in Contemporary Africa (Dakar: Codesria, 2008), pp. 209–228.
- Angela Nickerson, Richard A. Bryant, Robert Brooks, Zachary Steel, Derrick Silove, "Fear of Cultural Extinction and Psychopathology among Mandaean Refugees: An Exploratory Path Analysis," CNS Neuroscience & Therapeutics, vol. 15 (2009), pp. 227–236.
- Angela Nickerson, Richard A. Bryant, Zachary Steel, Derrick Silove, Robert Brooks, "The impact of fear for family on mental health in a resettled Iraqi refugee community," Journal of Psychiatric Research, vol. 44 (2010), pp. 229–235.
- Geoffrey A. Oddy, Religion in South Asia: Religious Conversion and Revival Movements in South Asia in Medieval and Modern Times (New Delhi: Manohar, 1991).
- Kefa M. Otiso, Culture and Customs of Uganda (Westport, Connecticut: Greenwood Press, 2006).
- Marcel Rutten, Sam Owuor, "Weapons of mass destruction: Land, ethnicity and the 2007 elections in Kenya," Journal of Contemporary African Studies, vol. 27 (2009), pp. 305–324.
- Jonathan Schorsch, Jews and Blacks in the Early Modern World (New York: Cambridge University Press, 2004).
- Rodney Stark, God's Battalions: The Case for the Crusades (New York: HarperCollins Publishers, 2009).
- Debra Higgs Strickland, Saracens, Demons, & Jews: Making Monsters in Medieval Art, (Princeton, New Jersey: Princeton University Press, 2003).
- Peter Sutton, The Politics of Suffering: Indigenous Australia and the End of the Liberal Consensus (Carlton, Victoria: Melbourne University Press, 2009).
- Esther Rogoff Taus, Torah for Today (Lanham, Maryland: University Press of America, 2008).
- Gene R. Thursby, Hindu-Muslim Relations in British India: A Study of Controversy, Conflict, and Communal Movements in Northern India 1923-1928 (Leiden: Brill, 1975).
- Peter Tomson, "Transformations of Post-70 Judaism: Scholarly Reconstructions and Their Implications for our Perception of Matthew, Didache, and James," in: Huub van de Sandt, Jürgen Zangenberg, eds, Matthew, James, and Didache: Three Related Documents in Their Jewish and Christian Settings (Symposium Series, vol. 45; Atlanta and Leiden: Society of Biblical Literature and Brill: 2008), pp. 91–122.
- Speros Vryonis, The Mechanism of Catastrophe (New York: Greekworks, 2005).
- Koigi wa Wamwere, I Refuse to Die: My Journey for Freedom (New York: Seven Stories Press, 2002).
- Steven Weitzman, "Forced Circumcision and the Shifting Role of Gentiles in Hasmonean Ideology," Harvard Theological Review, vol. 92 (1999), pp. 37–59.
- Bat Ye'or, The Decline of Eastern Christianity under Islam—From Jihad to Dhimmitude (trans. Miriam Kochan and David Littman; Madison and Teaneck, New Jersey: Fairleigh Dickinson University Press, 1996).
- Chantal J. Zabus, Between Rites and Rights: Excision in Women's Experiential Texts and Human Contexts (Palo Alto, California: Stanford University Press, 2007).
- Alfred de Zayas, "The Istanbul Pogrom of 6–7 September 1955 in the Light of International Law," Genocide Studies and Prevention, vol. 2 (2007), pp. 137–154.
