= I like to see it lap the Miles =

Poem by Emily Dickinson

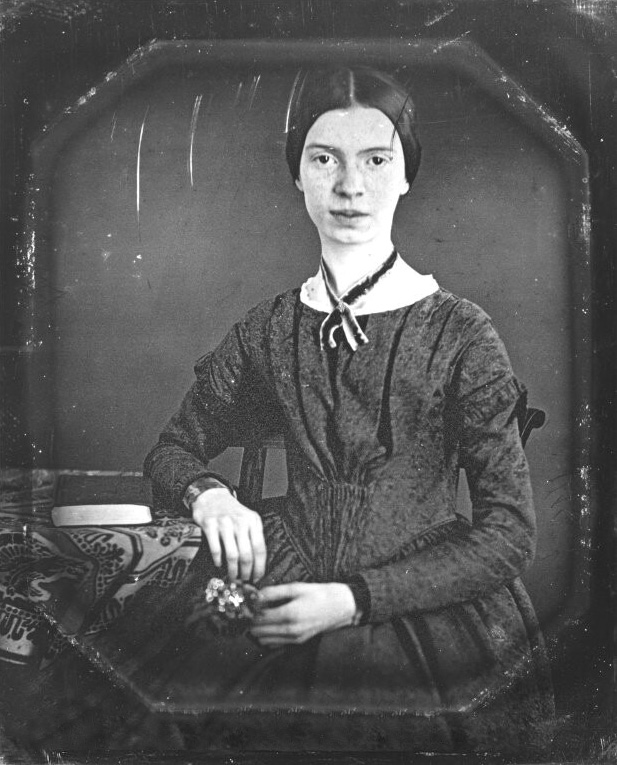
Emily Dickinson in a daguerreotype, circa December 1846 or early 1847

"I like to see it lap the Miles" is a short poem by Emily Dickinson describing an "iron horse" or railroad engine and its train. The poem was first published in 1891.

== Summary ==
This poem is four stanzas, each with a length of four lines, and describes a railroad engine and its train of cars in metaphors that suggest an animal that is both "docile" and "omnipotent". The train "laps the miles" and "licks up the valleys" then stops to "feed itself" at tanks along the way. It passes mountains with a "prodigious step", "peers" superciliously into shanties, and moves through a narrow passage in a quarry. After descending a hill, it stops at the terminal like a horse before its barn door. It is also known as "The Amherst Train" or "The Railway Train".

Close transcription

I like to see it lap the Miles —
And lick the Valleys up —
And stop to feed itself at Tanks —
And then — prodigious step

Around a Pile of Mountains —
And supercilious peer
In Shanties — by the sides of Roads —
And then a Quarry pare

To fit it's sides
And crawl between
Complaining all the while
In horrid - hooting stanza —
Then chase itself down Hill —

And neigh like Boanerges —
Then — prompter than a Star
Stop — docile and omnipotent
At it's own stable door —

First published version

THE RAILWAY TRAIN

I like to see it lap the miles,
And lick the valleys up,
And stop to feed itself at tanks;
And then, prodigious, step

Around a pile of Mountains,
And, supercilious, peer
In shanties by the sides of roads;
And then a quarry pare

To fit its sides, and crawl between,
Complaining all the while
In horrid, hooting stanza;
Then chase itself down hill

And neigh like Boanerges;
Then, punctual as a star,
Stop — docile and omnipotent —
At its own stable door.

== Background and critique ==
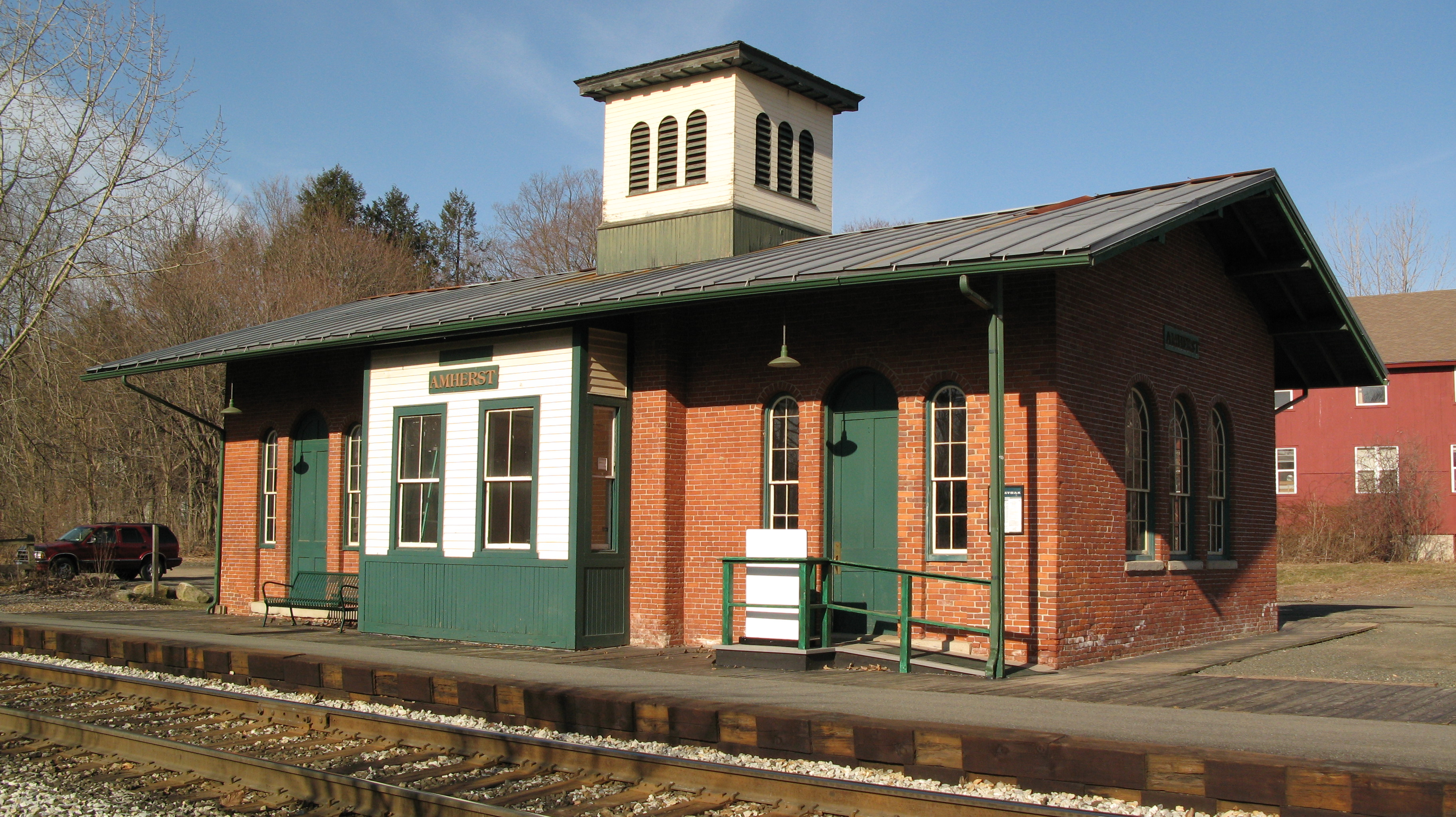
The Amherst railroad station, built in 1853

Helen Vendler points out that the railroad (as a symbol of progress) was not an uncommon subject for literature in 19th century America, and indicates Dickinson's father (a lawyer) was instrumental in bringing the railroad to their hometown of Amherst, Massachusetts. The station was situated not far from the Dickinson Homestead on Main Street, and the reclusive Dickinson attended its opening, watching alone from the woods.

Criticism of the poem is varied, Vendler observes. Children love this poem, but critics find it "coy" and "lightweight". The 'peering into shanties' metaphor is thought "snobbish". The exact animal employed as a metaphor for the railroad initially proves a puzzle, but at poem's end it is decidedly a horse which neighs and stops (like the Christmas Star) at a "stable door". The "horrid - hooting stanza" is the train's whistle but, at the same time, as Vendler believes, a self-criticism Dickinson makes of herself as a "bad poet".

Harold Bloom points out that the poem is a riddle (like Dickinson's "A Route of Evanescence" and "A narrow Fellow in the Grass"), and that the poet enjoyed sending children, especially her Norcross cousins, such poems, taking delight in observing her audience discovering the poem's subject. Bloom indicates the poem is one of the very few in which Dickinson examined a current technology, and points out that its theme is the effect such a technology may have on the landscape and on people and animals. Bloom observes that the reader discovers the subject of the poem is a train by "seeing and hearing it, instead of being told directly".
