= Negation in Arabic =

Grammatical negation in the Arabic language

Negation in Arabic (Arabic: ٱلنَّفْي, romanized: al-nafy 'the negative') is the array of approaches used in Arabic grammar to express grammatical negation. These strategies correspond to words in English like no and not.

== Modern Standard Arabic ==
=== Negation in the present tense ===
==== Negating present-tense verbs ====
لا lā "not"; a male speaker from Tiznit, Morocco.

Present-tense verbs are negated by adding لا lā "not" before the verb:

sentence type	example
affirmative sentence	أُحِبُّ الجَزَرَ ’uḥibbu l-jazara "I like carrots"
negative sentence	لا أُحِبُّ الجَزَرَ lā ’uḥibbu l-jazara "I do not like carrots"

==== Negation of sentences with no verb ====
If a sentence would, in the affirmative, have no verb (this can only happen in the present tense), then the negative verb لَيْسَ laysa "is not" is used. laysa is inflected like a past-tense verb, but is used to negate present-tense sentences. As with كانَ kāna "was", the complement of laysa must be in the accusative case. Before consonantal endings, the diphthong -ay- is reduced to a short -a-.

Here is an example sentence saying that something is not big in all possible persons and numbers:

person	singular	dual	plural
1st m	لَسْتُ كَبِيرًا lastu kabīran "I am not big"	لَسْنَا كَبِيرَيْنِ lasnā kabīrayni "we are not big"	لَسْنَا كُبَرَاءَ lasnā kubarāʾa "we are not big"
1st f	لَسْتُ كَبِيرَةً lastu kabīratan "I am not big"	لَسْنَا كَبِيرَتَيْنِ lasnā kabīratayni "we are not big"	لَسْنَا كَبِيرَاتٍ lasnā kabīrātin "we are not big"
2nd m	لَسْتَ كَبِيرًا lasta kabīran "you (m) are not big"	لَسْتُمَا كَبِيرَيْنِ lastumā kabīrayni "you two (m) are not big"	لَسْتُمْ كُبَرَاءَ lastum kubarā’a "you (m) are not big"
2nd f	لَسْتِ كَبِيرَةً lasti kabīratan "you (f) are not big"	لَسْتُمَا كَبِيرَتَيْنِ lastumā kabīratayni "you two (f) are not big"	لَسْتُنَّ كَبِيرَاتٍ lastunna kabīrātin "you (f) are not big"
3rd m	لَيْسَ كَبِيرًا laysa kabīran "he is not big"	لَيْسَا كَبِيرَيْنِ laysā kabīrayni "the two of them (m) are not big"	لَيْسُوا كُبَرَاءَ laysū kubarā’a "they (m) are not big"
3rd f	لَيْسَت كَبِيرَةً laysat kabīratan "she is not big"	لَيْسَتَا كَبِيرَتَيْنِ laysatā kabīratayni "the two of them (f) are not big"	لَسْنَ كَبِيرَاتٍ lasna kabīrātin "they (f) are not big"

=== Negation of past-tense verbs ===
In Modern Standard Arabic, the main way to negate past-tense verbs is to add the negative particle لَمْ lam "not" before the verb, and to put the verb in the jussive mood. In more colloquial usage, it is possible to give the verb in the present indicative mood (which is largely identical in form to the jussive).

sentence type	example
affirmative sentence	أَحْبَبْتُ الجَزَرَ ’aḥbabtu l-jazara "I liked carrots"
negative sentence	لَم أُحْبِبِ الجَزَرَ lam ʾuḥbibi l-jazara "I did not like carrots"
negative sentence	لَم أُحِبِّ الجَزَرَ lam ’uḥibbi l-jazara "I did not like carrots"

It is also possible to use the negative particle ما mā before the verb, giving the verb in the past tense.

sentence type	example
affirmative sentence	أَحْبَبْتُ الجَزَرَ ’aḥbabtu l-jazara "I liked carrots"
negative sentence	مَا أَحْبَبْتُ الجَزَرَ mā ’aḥbabtu l-jazara "I did not like carrots"

=== Negation of verbs in the future tense ===
Negating a proposition in the future is done by placing the negative particle لَنْ lan before the verb in the subjunctive mood.

sentence type	example
affirmative sentence	سَوْفَ أذْهَب إلى الدَّرْس غَداً sawfa ’aḏhabu ’ilā d-darsi ġadan "I will go to the class tomorrow"
negative sentence	لَنْ أذْهَب إلى الدَّرْس غَدا lan ’aḏhaba ’ilā d-darsi ġadan "I will not go to the class tomorrow"

=== Negation of imperative verbs ===
The imperative (known as الأَمْر "the order," from أَمَرَ "he ordered") is negated by putting لا lā "not" before the verb, putting the verb in the jussive, rather than the imperative, mood. (This negative imperative is known as النَّهْي "the discouragement," from نَهى "he discouraged.") For example, in the masculine singular: اِظْلِمْ (iẓlim, "oppress!"), لا تَظْلِمْ (lā taẓlim, "do not oppress!").

=== Saying "no" ===
"No", as an answer to a question, is expressed by the negative particle لا lā.

== Varieties of Arabic ==
Modern Standard Arabic لَيْسَ laysa "is not" is replaced in colloquial usage with a variety of other forms, which in origin are contractions of phrases such as ما مِنْ شَيْ mā min shay "nothing" (literally: "none from/of a thing"):

Variety	"she is not here" (Arabic script)	"she is not here" (transliteration)
MSA	لَيْسَت هُنَا	laysat hunā
Egyptian	هِيَ مِش هِنا	heyya meš hena
Moroccan	هِيَ ماشي هُنا	hiya māši hna
Algerian	هِيَ ماراهيش هُنا	hiya mārāhīš hna
Iraq	هِيَ مو هِنا	hiyya mū hnā

Maghrebi, Egyptian, and to a lesser extent, some Levantine varieties negate verbs using a circumfix—a combination of the prefix ma- and the suffix -ʃ. This, for example, is the negative paradigm of the verb كَتَبَ kataba "he wrote" in Algerian Arabic:

Person	Past		Present		Future		Present continuous	
Person	Singular	Plural	Singular	Plural	Singular	Plural	Singular	Plural
1st (m)	ma ktebt-š	ma ktebna-š	ma nekteb-š	ma nekketbu-š	ma Rayeḥ-š nekteb	ma Rayḥin-š nekketbu	ma Rani-š nekteb	ma Rana-š nekketbu
1st (f)	ma ktebt-š	ma ktebna-š	ma nekteb-š	ma nekketbu-š	ma Rayḥa-š nekteb	ma Rayḥin-š nekketbu	ma Rani-š nekteb	ma Rana-š nekketbu
2nd (m)	ma ketbt-š	ma ktebtu-š	ma tekteb-š	ma tekketbu-š	ma Rayeḥ-š tekteb	ma Rayḥin-š tekketbu	ma Rak-š tekteb	ma Rakum-š tekketbu
2nd (f)	ma ktebti-š	ma ktebtu-š	ma tekketbi-š	ma tekketbu-š	ma Rayḥa-š tekketbi	ma Rayḥin-š tekketbu	ma Raki-š tekketbi	ma Rakum-š tekketbu
3rd (m)	ma kteb-š	ma ketbu-š	ma yekteb-š	ma yekketbu-š	ma Rayeḥ-š yekteb	ma Rayḥin-š yekketbu	ma Rah-š yekteb	ma Rahum-š yekketbu
3rd (f)	ma ketbet-š	ma ketbu-š	ma tekteb-š	ma yekketbu-š	ma Rayḥa-š tekteb	ma Rayḥin-š yekketbu	ma Raha-š tekteb	ma Rahum-š yekketbu

In these varieties, to negate present participles and verbs conjugated in the future, mūš, or its conjugated form, is frequently used (in front of the verb). For example, Tunisian Arabic موش mūsh is conjugated as follows:

Pronoun	Auxiliary Verb
ānā آنا	mānīš مانيش
intī إنتي	mākiš ماكش
hūwa هوة	māhūš ماهوش
hīya هية	māhīš ماهيش
aḥnā أحنا	mānāš مناش
intūmā انتوما	mākumš مكمش
hūmā هومة	māhumš مهمش

== See also ==
- Illa (Arabic)
