= Ilah =

Arabic word for god

There is no Ilah except Allāh.

the word Ilah in Arabic

ʾIlāh (Arabic: إله; plural: آلهة ʾālihat) is an Arabic term that means deity, or anyone that is worshipped.

The feminine form is ʾilāhah (إلاهة, meaning 'goddess'); with the article, it appears as al-ʾilāhah (الإلاهة). The word is spelled either إلٰه with an optional diacritic alif to mark the ā only in Qur'anic texts or (more rarely) with a full alif, إلاه.

In its form as a possessive suffix with an -i ending, it is most commonly used to refer to the God of the monotheistic faiths, and is translated as 'my God'. The more commonly used standalone word for God in Arabic is Allah, conjectured to be a compound form of the Arabic definite article Al ('the') + Ilah, though this has been a matter of dispute.

== Etymology ==
The Semitic root ʾlh (Arabic ʾilāh', Aramaic ʾAlāh, ʾElāh, Hebrew ʾelōah) may be ʾl with a parasitic h, and ʾl may be an abbreviated form of ʾlh. In Ugaritic the plural form meaning 'gods' is ʾilhm, equivalent to Hebrew ʾ^{e}lōhîm.

Cognate forms of El are found throughout the Semitic languages. They include Ugaritic ʾilu, pl. ʾlm; Phoenician ʾl pl. ʾlm; Hebrew ʾēl, pl. ʾēlîm; Aramaic ʾl; Akkadian ilu, pl. ilānu.

The form ilah appeared only rarely in Aramaic personal names identified in cuneiform texts from Babylonia (c. 700–100 BCE). It was however more commonly used in possessive suffix form ilahi, with a final -i, appearing as the second component in personal names, for example, Mannu-kî-ilahī ('Who is like my God') or Abī-ilahī ('My father is my God').

== Current usages ==
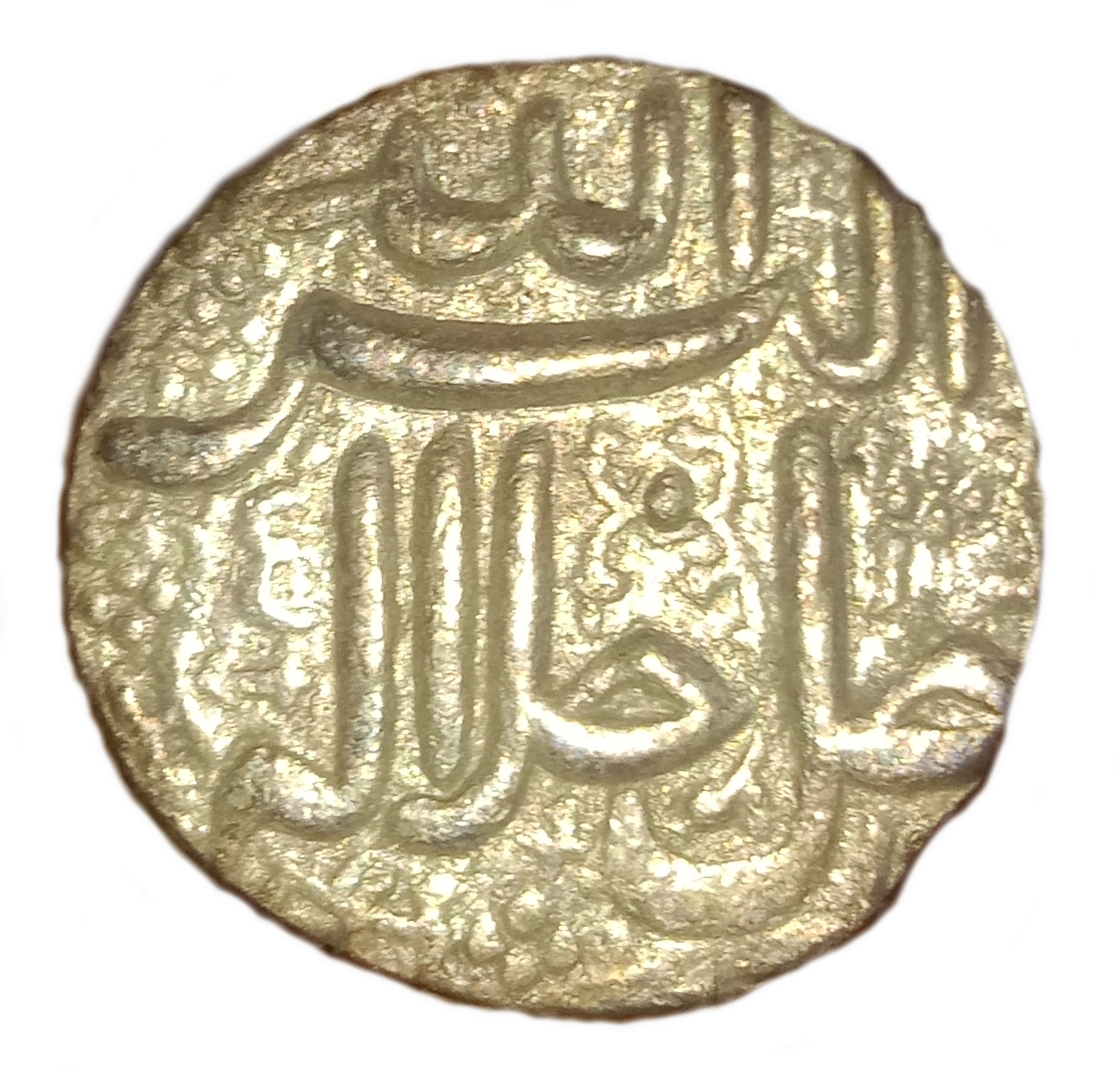
Silver rupee Ilāhi coin struck in the name of Mughal emperor Akbar, minted in Ahmadabad, from his regnal Year 47

The Arabic word for God, Allāh, is thought to be derived from it (in a proposed earlier form al-Lāh) though this has been disputed. The term is used throughout the Quran in passages discussing the existence of God in the context of Tawhid 'monotheism' and also to refer the beliefs in other divinities by non-Muslims. Notably, the first statement of the shahada, the confession of faith, is "There is no god (ʾilāh) except God (Allāh)", which declares a belief in pure monotheism.

The vocative form with possessive suffix -i, Ilāhi ('my God') is commonly used in everyday speech and in the liturgies of Arab Christians. In the sung prayers of the Muslim faithful in Turkey, Ilahi means "for God".

Conversely, in the sung prayers of the Sufi Isawiyya order, ilahi is repeated in their silsila chants over and over with the meaning 'my God'. In Persian, ilāhi also has the meaning of 'my God' and is used as an exclamation with the secondary meaning of "I hope".

The Mughal emperor Akbar issued Ilāhi coins, a reference to the religious philosophy din-i Ilahi ('the religion of the divine', or '... of my God') that he promulgated, using Ilāhi also as the name of the calendar era for his empire beginning in 1556 (963 AH) with the meaning of both 'divine' and 'my God'.

Ilahi appears in the title of a 1974 poem by Samih al-Qasim, "Ilahi, Ilahi, limadha qataltani ('my God, my God, why have you killed me?'). Another Palestinian poet, Mahmoud Darwish, includes "My God, my God, why have you forsaken me?" ("Ilahi ilahi limadha takhallayta `anni"; إلهي.. إلهي؟ لماذا تخلّيت عنّي؟ لماذا تزوّجت مريم) in his poem "Ward aqall" 'Fewer roses' (1986). This refrain is how Jesus addressed God while on the cross in Matthew 27:46, is repeated three times in the poem's stanzas.

Rabi wa Elahi ('my Lord and my God'), is a collection of Arabic liturgical songs produced by Syrian and Palestinian Christians in 2022, inspired by the words of Francis of Assisi after he received the stigmata: "My God and my everything".

== Bibliography ==
- Georgii Wilhelmi Freytagii, Lexicon Arabico-Latinum. Librairie du Liban, Beirut, 1975.
- J. Milton Cowan, The Hans Wehr Dictionary of Modern Written Arabic. 4th edn. Spoken Language Services, Ithaca (NY), 1979.
