= Language of Jesus =

The scholarly consensus holds that Jesus often spoke and taught in Aramaic, while likely knowing Hebrew and at least some Greek. Aramaic was a common language of Roman Judaea, and was thus also spoken by at least some of Jesus' disciples. The villages of Nazareth and Capernaum in Galilee, where the Gospels record him as having been raised, were populated by Aramaic-speaking communities. Jesus probably spoke the Galilean dialect, distinguishable from that which was spoken in Roman-era Jerusalem.

However, Greek was the lingua franca of the Roman Empire including in Judea. Galilee, where Jesus was raised and conducted his ministry, was known for its trade routes and for its interface with the wider spectrum of Hellenism and even Matthew 4:15 references the region as "Galilee of the Gentiles". As such, the Gospels understand Jesus' youth in Nazareth to be in a highly cosmopolitan area in which Greek was used frequently, 10 kilometres (6.2 mi) from the meeting of several major trade routes in Sepphoris. The New Testament was written in Greek, as seen in the earliest documents; there is also epigraphical and literary evidence of Greek in Galilee. The New Testament writers often quoted the Greek Old Testament directly. It is thus likely that Jesus and even some of his own disciples were able to work in Koine Greek and spoke it as well. His occupation as a tradesman required interaction with Greek speaking clients, some of his speeches such as the Sermon on the Mount, suggest he may have even taught in Greek and he certainly was capable of conversing with people from outside of Judea such as with the Syrophoenician woman, the Samaritan woman, and Pontius Pilate.

Additionally, given that Hebrew had continued to be used by Judeans who were left behind during the Babylonian captivity and is understood to be the language of composition for several canonical texts composed in the Second Temple period, Jesus was conversant in the Hebrew spoken among the Samaritans, according to John 4. Jesus was thus well versed in Biblical Hebrew, beyond its use as the liturgical language of Second Temple Judaism.

== Cultural and linguistic background ==
Aramaic was the common language of the Eastern Mediterranean during and after the Neo-Assyrian, Neo-Babylonian, and Achaemenid empires (722–330 BC) and remained a common language of the region in the first century AD. In spite of the increasing importance of Greek, the use of Aramaic was also expanding, and it would eventually be dominant among Jews both in the Holy Land and elsewhere in the Middle East around 200 AD and would remain so until the Islamic conquests in the seventh century.

=== Dead Sea Scrolls ===
According to Dead Sea Scrolls archaeologist Yigael Yadin, Aramaic was the language of Hebrews until Simon Bar Kokhba's revolt (132 AD to 135 AD). Yadin noticed the shift from Aramaic to Hebrew in the documents he studied, which had been written during the time of the Bar Kokhba revolt. In his book, Bar Kokhba: The rediscovery of the legendary hero of the last Jewish Revolt Against Imperial Rome, Yigael Yadin notes, "It is interesting that the earlier documents are written in Aramaic while the later ones are in Hebrew. Possibly the change was made by a special decree of Bar Kokhba who wanted to restore Hebrew as the official language of the state".

In another book by Sigalit Ben-Zion, Yadin said: "it seems that this change came as a result of the order that was given by Bar Kokhba, who wanted to revive the Hebrew language and make it the official language of the state." Yadin points out that Aramaic was the regional lingua franca at the time.

=== Josephus ===
Hebrew historian Josephus comments on learning Greek in first century Judea:

I have also taken a great deal of pains to obtain the learning of the Greeks, and understand the elements of the Greek language, although I have so long accustomed myself to speak our own tongue, that I cannot pronounce Greek with sufficient exactness; for our nation does not encourage those that learn the languages of many nations, and so adorn their discourses with the smoothness of their periods; because they look upon this sort of accomplishment as common, not only to all sorts of free-men, but to as many of the servants as please to learn them. But they give him the testimony of being a wise man who is fully acquainted with our laws, and is able to interpret their meaning; on which account, as there have been many who have done their endeavors with great patience to obtain this learning, there have yet hardly been so many as two or three that have succeeded therein, who were immediately well rewarded for their pains.

— Antiquities of Jews XX, XI

In the first century AD, the Aramaic language was widespread throughout the Middle East, as is supported by the testimony of Josephus's The Jewish War.

Josephus chose to inform people from what are now Iran, Iraq, and remote parts of the Arabian Peninsula about the war of the Jews against the Romans through books he wrote "in the language of our country", prior to translating into Greek for the benefit of the Greeks and Romans:

I have proposed to myself, for the sake of such as live under the government of the Romans, to translate those books into the Greek tongue, which I formerly composed in the language of our country, and sent to the Upper Barbarians; Joseph, the son of Matthias, by birth a Hebrew, a priest also, and one who at first fought against the Romans myself, and was forced to be present at what was done afterwards, [am the author of this work].

— Jewish Wars (Book 1, Preface, Paragraph 1)

I thought it therefore an absurd thing to see the truth falsified in affairs of such great consequence, and to take no notice of it; but to suffer those Greeks and Romans that were not in the wars to be ignorant of these things, and to read either flatteries or fictions, while the Parthians, and the Babylonians, and the remotest Arabians, and those of our nation beyond Euphrates, with the Adiabeni, by my means, knew accurately both whence the war begun, what miseries it brought upon us, and after what manner it ended.

— Jewish Wars (Book 1 Preface, Paragraph 2)

H. St. J. Thackeray (who translated Josephus' Jewish Wars from Greek into English) also points out, "We learn from the proem that the Greek text was not the first draft of the work. It had been preceded by a narrative written in Aramaic and addressed to "the barbarians in the interior", who are more precisely defined lower down as the natives of Parthia, Babylonia, and Arabia, the Jewish dispersion in Mesopotamia, and the inhabitants of Adiabene, a principality of which the reigning house, as was proudly remembered, were converts to Judaism (B. i, 3, 6). Of this Aramaic work the Greek is described as a "version" made for the benefit of the subjects of the Roman Empire, i.e. the Graeco-Roman world at large.

In Acts 1:19, the "Field of Blood" was known to all the inhabitants of Jerusalem in their own language as Akeldama, which is the transliteration of the Aramaic words "Haqal Dama".

Josephus differentiated Hebrew from his language and that of first-century Israel. Josephus refers to Hebrew words as belonging to "the Hebrew tongue" but refers to Aramaic words as belonging to "our tongue" or "our language" or "the language of our country".

Josephus refers to a Hebrew word with the phrase "the Hebrew tongue": "But the affairs of the Canaanites were at this time in a flourishing condition, and they expected the Israelites with a great army at the city Bezek, having put the government into the hands of Adonibezek, which name denotes the Lord of Bezek, for Adoni in the Hebrew tongue signifies Lord."

In this example, Josephus refers to an Aramaic word as belonging to "our language": "This new-built part of the city was called 'Bezetha,' in our language, which, if interpreted in the Grecian language, may be called 'the New City.'"

On several occasions in the New Testament, Aramaic words are called Hebrew. For example, in John 19:17 (KJV), the gospel-writer narrates that Jesus, "bearing his cross[,] went forth into a place called the place of a skull, which is called in the Hebrew Golgotha." The last word is, in fact, Aramaic. The word "Golgotha" is a transliteration of an Aramaic word, because -tha in Golgotha is the Aramaic definite article on a feminine noun in an emphatic state.

== Aramaic phrases in the Greek New Testament ==
The Greek New Testament transliterates a few Semitic words. When the text refers to the language of such Semitic glosses, it uses words meaning "Hebrew"/"Jewish" (Acts 21:40; 22:2; 26:14: têi hebraḯdi dialéktōi, lit. 'in the Hebrew dialect/language') but this term is often applied to unmistakably Aramaic words and phrases; for this reason, it is often interpreted as meaning "the (Aramaic) vernacular of the Jews" in recent translations.

A small minority of scholars believe that most or all of the New Testament was originally written in Aramaic. This theory is known as Aramaic primacy.

=== Talitha kum (Ταλιθὰ κούμ) ===
In the Gospel of Mark, 5:41:

He took her by the hand and said to her, “Talitha cum,” which means, “Little girl, get up!”

— Mark 5:41

This verse gives an Aramaic phrase, attributed to Jesus bringing the girl back to life, with a transliteration into Greek, as ταλιθὰ κούμ. A few Greek manuscripts (Codex Sinaiticus, Vaticanus) of Mark's Gospel have this form of the text, but others (Codex Alexandrinus, the text-type known as the Majority Text, and also the Latin Vulgate) write κοῦμι (koumi, cumi) instead. The latter is in the Textus Receptus and is the version which appears in the KJV.

The Aramaic is ṭlīthā qūm. The word ṭlīthā is the feminine form of the word ṭlē, meaning "young". Qūm is the Aramaic verb 'to rise, stand, get up'. In the feminine singular imperative, it was originally qūmī. However, there is evidence that in speech, the final -ī was dropped so the imperative did not distinguish between masculine and feminine genders. The older manuscripts, therefore, used a Greek spelling that reflected pronunciation, whereas the addition of an 'ι' was perhaps due to a bookish copyist.

In square script Aramaic, it could be טליתא קומי or טליתא קום.

=== Ephphatha (Ἐφφαθά) ===
Mark 7:34

And looking up to heaven, he sighed and said to him, "Ephphatha," which is 'be opened'.

Once again, the Aramaic word is given with the transliteration, only this time, the word to be transliterated is more complicated. In Greek, the Aramaic is written ἐφφαθά. This could be from the Aramaic ethpthaḥ, the passive imperative of the verb pthaḥ, 'to open', since the th could assimilate in western Aramaic. The pharyngeal ḥ was often omitted in Greek transcriptions in the Septuagint (Greek Old Testament) and was also softened in Galilean speech.

In Aramaic, it could be אתפתח or אפתח. This word was adopted as the official motto of Gallaudet University, the United States' most prominent school for the deaf.

=== Abba (Ἀββά[ς]) ===
Mark 14:36

"Abba, Father," he said, "everything is possible for you. Take this cup from me. Yet not what I will, but what you will."

Galatians 4:6

Because you are his sons, God sent the Spirit of his Son into our hearts, the Spirit who calls out, "Abba, Father."

Romans 8:15

The Spirit you received does not make you slaves, so that you live in fear again; rather, the Spirit you received brought about your adoption to sonship. And by him we cry, "Abba, Father."

Abba, an originally Aramaic form borrowed into the Greek Old Testament as a name (2Chr 29:1) [standing for the Hebrew Abijah (אביה)], common in Mishnaic Hebrew and still used in Modern Hebrew (written Αββά[ς] in Greek, and ’abbā in Aramaic), is immediately followed by the Greek equivalent (Πατήρ) with no explicit mention of it being a translation. In Aramaic, it would be אבא.

Note, the name Barabbas is a Hellenization of the Aramaic Bar Abba (בר אבא), literally "Son of the Father".

=== Raca (Ρακά) ===
Matthew 5:22

But I say unto you, That whosoever is angry with his brother [without a cause] shall be in danger of the judgment: and whosoever shall say to his brother, Raca, shall be in danger of the council: but whosoever shall say, Thou fool, shall be in danger of hell fire.

(The bracketed text does not appear in all recensions and is absent in the Latin Vulgate.)

Raca, or Raqa, in the Aramaic and Hebrew of the Talmud, means empty one, fool, empty head.

In Aramaic, it could be ריקא or ריקה.

=== Mammon (Μαμωνάς) ===
Gospel of Matthew 6:24

No one can serve two masters: for either they will hate the one, and love the other; or else they will hold to the one, and despise the other. You cannot serve God and mammon.

Luke 16:9–13

And I say unto you, Make to yourselves friends of the mammon of unrighteousness; that, when ye fail, they may receive you into everlasting habitations. He that is faithful in that which is least is faithful also in much: and he that is unjust in the least is unjust also in much. If therefore ye have not been faithful in the unrighteous mammon, who will commit to your trust the true riches? And if ye have not been faithful in that which is another man's, who shall give you that which is your own? No servant can serve two masters: for either he will hate the one, and love the other; or else he will hold to the one, and despise the other. Ye cannot serve God and mammon.

2 Clement 6

Now the Lord declares, "No servant can serve two masters." If we desire, then, to serve both God and mammon, it will be unprofitable for us. "For what will it profit if a man gain the whole world, and lose his own soul?" This world and the next are two enemies. The one urges to adultery and corruption, avarice and deceit; the other bids farewell to these things. We cannot, therefore, be the friends of both; and it behoves us, by renouncing the one, to make sure of the other. Let us reckon that it is better to hate the things present, since they are trifling, and transient, and corruptible; and to love those [who are to come,] as being good and incorruptible. For if we do the will of Christ, we shall find rest; otherwise, nothing shall deliver us from eternal punishment, if we disobey His commandments. (Roberts-Donaldson)

In Aramaic, it could be ממון (or, in the typical Aramaic "emphatic" state suggested by the Greek ending, ממונא). This is usually considered to be an originally Aramaic word borrowed into Rabbinic Hebrew, but its occurrence in late Biblical Hebrew and, reportedly, in 4th century Punic may indicate that it had a more general "common Semitic background".

In the New Testament, the word Μαμωνᾶς Mamōnâs is declined like a Greek word, whereas many of the other Aramaic and Hebrew words are treated as indeclinable foreign words.

=== Rabbuni (Ραββουνί) ===
John 20:16

Jesus saith unto her, Mary. She turned herself, and saith unto him, Rabboni; which is to say, Master. (KJV)

Also in Mark 10:51. Hebrew form rabbi used as title of Jesus in Matthew 26:25,49; Mark 9:5, 11:21, 14:45; John 1:38, 1:49, 4:31, 6:25, 9:2, 11:8.

In Aramaic, it would have been רבוני.

=== Maranatha (Μαραναθά) ===
Didache 10:6 (Prayer after Communion)

Let grace come, and let this world pass away. Hosanna to the God (Son) of David! If any one is holy, let him come; if any one is not so, let him repent. Maran-Atha. Amen. (Roberts-Donaldson)

1 Corinthians 16:22

If any man love not the Lord Jesus Christ, let him be Anathema Maranatha.

Depending on how one selects to split the single Greek expression of the early manuscripts into Aramaic, it could be variously one of the following:

- מרנא תא (marana tha, "Lord, come!")
- מרא נא תא (mara na tha, "Lord, please come!")
- מרן אתא (maran atha, "Our Lord has come")

=== Eli, Eli, lema sabachthani (Ἠλί, Ἠλί, λεμὰ σαβαχθανί) ===
This phrase, one of the seven sayings of Jesus on the cross, is given in two versions: in the Gospel of Matthew, it is transliterated in Greek as Ἠλί, Ἠλί, λεμὰ σαβαχθανί; in the Gospel of Mark, it is given as Ἐλωΐ, Ἐλωΐ, λαμὰ σαβαχθανί. The differences between the two are the use, in Mark, of elōi rather than ēli, and of lama rather than lema.

Overall, both versions can be said to be in Aramaic, rather than in Hebrew, because of the verb שבק (šbq) "abandon", which exists only in Aramaic. The Biblical Hebrew counterpart to this word, עזב (‘zb) is seen in the second verse of the Old Testament's Psalm 22, which the saying appears to quote. Thus, Jesus is not quoting the canonical Hebrew version (ēlī ēlī lāmā ‘azabtānī), which the psalm claims was of King David, but rather the version in an Aramaic Targum (translation of the Bible). Surviving Aramaic Targums do use the verb šbq in their translations of the Psalm 22.

The word used in the Gospel of Mark for "my god", Ἐλωΐ, corresponds to the Aramaic form אלהי, elāhī. The one used in Matthew, Ἠλί, fits in better with the אלי of the original Hebrew Psalm, as has been pointed out in the literature; however, it may also be Aramaic because this form is attested abundantly in Aramaic as well.

In the next verse, in both accounts, some who hear Jesus' cry imagine that he is calling for help from Elijah (Ēlīyā in Aramaic).

Almost all ancient Greek manuscripts show signs of trying to normalize the two slightly different versions of Jesus's saying, presented in Mark and Matthew. For instance, the peculiar Codex Bezae renders both versions with ηλι ηλι λαμα ζαφθανι (ēli ēli lama zaphthani). The Alexandrian, Western and Caesarean textual families all reflect harmonization of the texts between Matthew and Mark. Only the Byzantine textual tradition preserves a distinction.

The Aramaic word form šəḇaqtanī is based on the verb šǝḇaq/šāḇaq, 'to allow, to permit, to forgive, and to forsake', with the perfect aspect ending -t (second person singular: 'you'), and the object suffix -anī (first person singular: 'me').

The most likely rendition of the phrase in its original Aramaic, as said by Jesus, would have been "אלי, אלי, למה שבקתני", transliterated as Eli, Eli, ləmā šəḇaqtanī.

In Hebrew, the saying would be "אֵלִי אֵלִי, לָמָה עֲזַבְתָּנִי" (ēlī ēlī, lāmā ‘azabtānī in Biblical Hebrew, eli eli lama azavtani in Modern Hebrew pronunciation), while the Syriac-Aramaic phrase according to the Peshitta would be Syriac: ܐܝܠܝ ܐܝܠܝ ܠܡܐ ܫܒܩܬܢܝ, romanized: ʔēl ʔēl lǝmā šǝḇaqtān (Matthew 27:46) or Syriac: ܐܠܗܝ ܐܠܗܝ ܠܡܢܐ ܫܒܩܬܢܝ, romanized: ʾalāh ʾalāh lǝmānā šǝḇaqtān (Mark 15:34).

This saying is taken by some as an abandonment of the Son by the Father. Another interpretation holds that at the moment when Jesus took upon himself the sins of humanity, the Father had to turn away from the Son because the Father is "of purer eyes than to see evil and cannot look at wrong" (ESV). Other theologians understand the cry as that of one who was truly human and who felt forsaken. Put to death by his foes, very largely deserted by his friends, he may have also felt deserted by God.

Others see these words in the context of Psalm 22 and suggest that Jesus recited these words, perhaps even the whole psalm, "that he might show himself to be the very Being to whom the words refer; so that the Jewish scribes and people might examine and see the cause why he would not descend from the cross; namely, because this very psalm showed that it was appointed that he should suffer these things."

=== Jot and tittle (Ἰῶτα ἓν ἢ μία κεραία) ===
Matthew 5:18

For assuredly, I say to you, till heaven and earth pass away, one jot or one tittle will by no means pass from the Law (that is, the Torah) till all is fulfilled.

The quotation uses them as an example of extremely minor details. In the Greek text translated as English jot and tittle is found iota and keraia. Iota is the smallest letter of the Greek alphabet (ι), but since only capitals were used at the time the Greek New Testament was written (Ι; still, it is the smallest of all the Greek majuscules) and because the Torah was written in Hebrew, it probably represents the Hebrew yodh (י) which is the smallest letter of the Hebrew alphabet. Keraia is a hook or serif.

=== Korban (Κορβάν) ===
Matthew 27:6

But the chief priests, taking the pieces of silver, said, ‘It is not lawful to put them into the treasury, since they are blood money.’

In Aramaic (קרבנא) it refers to the treasury in the Temple in Jerusalem, derived from the Hebrew Korban (קרבן), found in Mark 7:11 and the Septuagint (in Greek transliteration), meaning religious gift or offering.

The Greek κορβανᾶς is declined as a Greek noun, much like other examples.

=== Sikera (Σίκερα) ===
Luke 1:15

for he will be great in the sight of the Lord. He must never drink wine or strong drink; even before his birth he will be filled with the Holy Spirit.

=== Hosanna (Ὡσαννά) ===
Mark 11:9

Then those who went ahead and those who followed were shouting, Hosanna! Blessed is the one who comes in the name of the Lord!

This word is derived from הושע נא. It is generally considered to be a quote from Psalms 118:25 "O Lord, save (us)", but the original Biblical Hebrew form was הושיעה נא (hōšî‘āh nā). The shortened form הושע could be either Aramaic or Hebrew.

== Aramaic personal names in the New Testament ==
Personal names in the New Testament come from a number of languages; Hebrew and Greek are most common. However, there are a few Aramaic names as well. The most prominent feature in Aramaic names is bar (Greek transliteration βαρ, Aramaic bar), meaning 'son of', a common patronym prefix. Its Hebrew equivalent, ben, is conspicuous by its absence. Some examples are:

- Matthew 10:3 – Bartholomew (Βαρθολομαῖος from bar-Tōlmay, perhaps "son of furrows" or "ploughman").
- Matthew 16:17 – Simon bar-Jona (Σίμων Βαριωνᾶς from Šim‘ōn bar-Yōnā, "Simon son of Jonah").
- John 1:42 – Simon bar-Jochanan ("Simon son of John").
- Matthew 27:16 – Barabbas (Βαραββᾶς from bar-Abbā, "son of the father").
- Mark 10:46 – Bartimaeus (Βαρτιμαῖος possibly from combination of Aramaic bar and Greek timaios meaning "honorable" or "highly prized", perhaps "honorable son").
- Acts 1:23 – Barsabbas (Βαρσαββᾶς from bar-Šabbā, "son of the Sabbath").
- Acts 4:36 – Joseph who is called Barnabas (Βαρνάβας from bar-Navā meaning "son of prophecy", "the prophet", but given the Greek translation υἱὸς παρακλήσεως; usually translated as "son of consolation/encouragement", the Greek could mean "invocation" as well).
- Acts 13:6 – Bar-Jesus (Βαριησοῦς from bar-Išo, "son of Jesus/Joshua").

=== Boanerges (Βοανηργές) ===
Mark 3:17

And James, the son of Zebedee, and John, the brother of James, and he gave them the name Boanerges, which is Sons of Thunder.

Jesus surnames the brothers James and John to reflect their impetuosity. The Greek rendition of their name is Βοανηργές (Boanērges).

The name Boanerges has given rise to much speculation. Given the Greek translation provided by the Biblical text ('Sons of Thunder'), it seems that the first element of the name is bnē, 'sons of' (the plural of 'bar'), Aramaic (בני). This is represented by βοάνη (boanē), giving two vowels in the first syllable where one would be sufficient. It could be inferred from this that the Greek transliteration may not be a good one. The second part of the name is often reckoned to be rḡaš ('tumult') Aramaic (רגיש), or rḡaz ('anger') Aramaic (רגז). Maurice Casey, however, argues that rḡaš is a simple misreading of the word for thunder, rḡam (due to the similarity of the Square script symbols samech and mem, for the Aramaic [s] and final [m]). This is supported by one Syriac translation of the name as bnay ra‘mâ. The Peshitta reads ܒܢܝ ܪܓܫܝ bnay rḡešy, which would fit with a later composition for it, based on a Byzantine reading of the original Greek.

=== Cephas (Κηφᾶς) ===
John 1:42

He brought him to Jesus. Jesus looked at him and said, "You are Simon son of John, you shall be called Cephas", which is translated 'Peter'. (New International Version)

1 Corinthians 1:12

But I say that each of you says "I am of Paul", or "I am of Apollos", or "I am of Cephas", or "I am of Christ".

Galatians 1:18 NRSV

Then after three years I did go up to Jerusalem to visit Cephas and stayed with him for fifteen days;

In these passages, 'Cephas' is given as the nickname of the apostle better known as Simon Peter. The Greek word is transliterated Κηφᾶς (Kēphâs).

The apostle's given name appears to be Simon, and he is given the Aramaic nickname, kēpā, meaning 'rock' or 'stone'. The final sigma (ς) is added in Greek to make the name masculine rather than feminine. That the meaning of the name was more important than the name itself is evidenced by the universal acceptance of the Greek translation, Πέτρος (Petros). It is not known why Paul uses the Aramaic name rather than the Greek name for Simon Peter when he writes to the churches in Galatia and Corinth. He may have been writing at a time before Cephas came to be popularly known as Peter.

According to Clement of Alexandria, there were two people named Cephas: one was Apostle Simon Peter, and the other was one of Jesus' Seventy Apostles. Clement goes further to say it was Cephas of the Seventy who was condemned by Paul in Galatians 2 for not eating with the Gentiles, though this is perhaps Clement's way of deflecting the condemnation from Simon Peter. In 1708, a French Jesuit, Jean Hardouin, wrote a dissertation that argues "Peter" was actually "another Peter", thus the emphasis of using the name Cephas (Aramaic for Peter). In 1990 Bart D. Ehrman wrote an article on the Journal of Biblical Literature, similarly arguing that Peter and Cephas should be understood as different people, citing the writing of Clement of Alexandria and the Epistula Apostolorum and in support of his theory; Ehrman's article received a detailed critique by Dale Allison, who argued that Peter and Cephas are the same person. Ehrman later retracted his proposal, deeming it "highly unlikely".

In Aramaic, it could be כיפא.

=== Thomas (Θωμᾶς) ===
John 11:16

Then Thomas, who was called Didymus, said to his co-disciples, "Now let us go that we might die with him!"

Thomas (Θωμᾶς) is listed among the disciples of Jesus in all four gospels and the Acts of the Apostles. However, it is only in John's Gospel that more information is given. In three places (John 11:16, 20:24 and 21:2), he is given the name Didymus (Δίδυμος), the Greek word for a twin. In fact, "the Twin" is not just a surname, it is a translation of "Thomas". The Greek Θωμᾶς—Thōmâs—comes from the Aramaic tōmā, "twin". Therefore, rather than two personal names, Thomas Didymus, there is a single nickname, the Twin. Christian tradition gives him the personal name Judas, and he was perhaps named Thomas to distinguish him from others of the same name.

In Aramaic, it could be ܬܐܘܡܐ.

=== Tabitha (Ταβιθά) ===
Acts 9:36

In Joppa, there was a disciple named Tabitha, which is translated Dorcas.

The disciple's name is given both in Aramaic (Ταβιθά) and Greek (Δορκάς). Both names mean 'gazelle'. The Aramaic name is a transliteration of Ṭḇīthā, the female form of טביא (Ṭaḇyā).

It may be just coincidence that Peter's words to her in verse 40, "Tabitha, get up!" (Ταβιθᾶ ἀνάστηθι), are similar to the "talitha kum" phrase used by Jesus.

In Aramaic, it could be טביתא.

== Aramaic place names in the New Testament ==
=== Gethsemane (Γεθσημανῆ) ===
Matthew 26:36

Then Jesus went with them to a place called Gethsemane.

Mark 14:32

And they went to a place that has the name Gethsemane.

The place where Jesus takes his disciples to pray before his arrest is given the Greek transliteration Γεθσημανῆ (Gethsēmanē). It represents the Aramaic Gath-Šmānē, meaning 'the oil press' or 'oil vat' (referring to olive oil).

In Aramaic, it could be ܓܕܣܡܢ. This place name is more properly an Aramaized version of an original Hebrew place name. Gath גת is a normal word for press in Hebrew, generally used for a wine press not an olive press though; and shemanei שמני is the Hebrew word shemanim שמנים meaning "oils", the plural form of the word shemen שמן, the primary Hebrew word for oil, just in a construct form (-ei instead of the ordinary plural suffix -im). The word in Aramaic for "oil" is more properly mišḥa (משחא), as also attested in Jewish writings in Aramaic from the Galilee (see Caspar Levias, A Grammar of Galilean Aramaic, Jewish Theological Seminary of America, 1986).

=== Golgotha (Γολγοθᾶ) ===
Mark 15:22

And they took him up to the place Golgotha, which is translated Place of the Skull.

John 19:17

And carrying his cross by himself, he went out to the so-called Place of the Skull, which is called in 'Hebrew' Golgotha.

Gagūltā Aramaic, means 'skull'. The name appears in all of the gospels except Luke, which calls the place simply Kranion (Κρανίον) 'the Skull' in Greek, with no Semitic counterpart. The name 'Calvary' is taken from the Latin Vulgate translation, Calvaria.

In Aramaic, it could be ܓܓܘܠܬܐ. Though this word has the Aramaic final form -ta / -tha, it is otherwise also closer to the Hebrew word for skull, gulgolet גולגולת, than to the Aramaic form.

=== Gabbatha (Γαββαθᾶ) ===
John 19:13

When Pilate heard these words, he brought Jesus outside and sat on the judge's bench at a place called The Stone Pavement, or in Hebrew, Gabbatha.

The place name appears to be Aramaic. According to Josephus, War, V.ii.1, #51, the word Gabath means high place, or elevated place, so perhaps a raised flat area near the temple. The final "א" could then represent the emphatic state of the noun.

In Aramaic, it could be גבהתא.

=== Akeldama (Ἀκελδαμά) ===
Acts 1:19

And this became known to all the inhabitants of Jerusalem, so that field was called, in their own dialect, Akeldama, that is Field of Blood.

The place of Judas Iscariot's death is clearly named Field of Blood in Greek. However, the manuscript tradition gives a number of different spellings of the Aramaic. The Majority Text reads Ἀκελδαμά (Akeldama); other manuscript versions give Ἀχελδαμάχ (Acheldamach), Ἁκελδαμά (Hakeldama), Ἁχελδαμά (Hacheldama) and Ἁκελδαμάχ (Hakeldamach). Despite these variant spellings the Aramaic is most probably ḥqēl dmā, 'field of blood'. While the seemingly gratuitous Greek sound of kh [x] at the end of the word is difficult to explain, the Septuagint similarly adds this sound to the end of the Semitic name Ben Sira to form the Greek name for the Book of Sirakh (Latin: Sirach). The sound may be a dialectic feature of either the Greek speakers or the original Semitic language speakers.

In Aramaic, it could be חקל דמא.

=== Pool of Bethesda (Βηθεσδά) ===
John 5:2

Now there is in Jerusalem near the Sheep Gate a pool, which in Aramaic is called Bethesda and which is surrounded by five covered colonnades.

Bethesda was originally the name of a pool in Jerusalem, on the path of the Beth Zeta Valley, and is also known as the Sheep Pool. Its name in Aramaic means "House of Grace". It is associated with healing. In John 5, Jesus was reported healing a man at the pool.

For other Aramaic place names in the New Testament beginning with beth ("house of"), see Bethabara, Bethany, Bethphage and Bethsaida and Bethlehem.

In Aramaic, "Bethesda" could be spelled בית חסדא.

== Other languages ==
=== Greek ===
Greek was the lingua franca of the Roman Empire and 1st century Judea. Based on the symbolic renaming or nicknaming of some of his apostles, it is also likely that Jesus or at least one of his apostles knew enough Koine Greek to converse with non-Judaeans. It is reasonable to assume that Jesus was well versed in Hebrew for religious purposes, as it is the liturgical language of Judaism.

Jesus grew up in Galilee, a multicultural region which included Greek speaking people, and that his occupation required interaction with Greek speaking clients. Matthew 4:15 even calls the region "Galilee of the Gentile" that was completely surrounded by hellenistic culture due to Alexander the Great's conquest before the time of Jesus. Some of his speeches such as the Sermon on the Mount, suggest he may have even taught in Greek and certainly was capable of conversing with people from outside of Judea such as with the Syrophoenician woman, the Samaritan woman, and Pontius Pilate.

Furthermore, some of his own disciples would very likely have known Greek. Matthew was a tax collector who needed to interact with both diverse citizens and officials; Peter, Andrew, James and John were commercial fishermen who worked near others in the Sea of Galilee; Andrew, Philip, Bartholomew, and Thaddaeus had purely Greek names along with Greek alternate such as for Peter (Simon Peter). It sheds light on instances like John 12:20-22, where Greeks specifically asked Phillip and then, along with Andrew, to see Jesus. Mark 7:25-30, John 12:20-28, Matthew 8:5-13 and Luke 7:2-10 are some examples of multilingual interactions.

Greek was the lingua franca of the Roman Empire as it was the language of administration and trade throughout the Roman Empire, was also the language of the New Testament, and also was the language of urban dwellers that Jesus sometimes interacted with. Scholars have long recognized that the New Testament writers often quoted directly the Greek Old Testament. Greek had been spoken in Judea for centuries before Jesus even in places like Sepphoris which was near Nazareth, where Jesus dwelled. Jews that returned from the diaspora of the Roman Empire often also spoke Greek and it is estimated that 20% of the population in Jerusalem alone spoke Greek. Notable Jews also wrote their works in Greek such as Josephus.

When assessing the languages Jesus spoke, one has to take into account the language of the listeners of his messages.

Mark A. Chancey argued there has been overestimations with regards to the degree of Hellenization present in rural Galilee, and it is not known how much Greek fluency Jesus would have had, but Chancey considered that it would not have been necessary for his profession or ministry.

=== Latin ===
Catherine Hezser notes that Roman Judea was linguistically diverse, but there is less evidence for the usage of Latin by Jews. Latin was used for the Roman administration and military, and was never imposed on the local populations. Moreover, she explains that majority of individuals in rural and urban areas could not read literary texts, whether they were written in Hebrew, Aramaic, Greek or Latin.

Joshua Schachterle writing for the Bart Ehrman Blog, posits Jesus spoke almost exclusively in the Galilean dialect of Aramaic. Regarding Hebrew, Schachterle argues that while Jesus lacked formal training as the scholars and scribes, participation in ritual worship would have provided him enough to understand and even potentially cite scripture when he preached. Conversely, Schachterle characterizes the plausibility of Jesus speaking Greek as unlikely, and maintains that there is no historical support for the claim that he would have spoken any Latin.

== See also ==
- Race and appearance of Jesus
- Semitic languages

== Sources ==
- Baltes, Guido (2014a). "The Origins of the Exclusive Aramaic Model in the Nineteenth Century: Methodological Fallacies and Subtle Motives". The Language Environment of First Century Judaea. Leiden-Boston: Brill. pp. 7–34. ISBN 9789004264410.
- Baltes, Guido (2014b). "The Use of Hebrew and Aramaic in Epigraphic Sources of the New Testament Era". The Language Environment of First Century Judaea. Leiden-Boston: Brill. pp. 35–65. ISBN 9789004264410.
- Bivin, David N. (2014). "Jesus' Petros–petra Wordplay (Matthew 16:18): Is It Greek, Aramaic, or Hebrew?". The Language Environment of First Century Judaea. Leiden-Boston: Brill. pp. 375–394. ISBN 9789004264410.
- Buth, Randall (2014a). "Distinguishing Hebrew from Aramaic in Semitized Greek Texts, with an Application for the Gospels and Pseudepigrapha". The Language Environment of First Century Judaea. Leiden-Boston: Brill. pp. 247–319. ISBN 9789004264410.
- Buth, Randall (2014b). "The Riddle of Jesus' Cry from the Cross: The Meaning of ηλι ηλι λαμα σαβαχθανι (Matthew 27:46) and the Literary Function of ελωι ελωι λειμα σαβαχθανι (Mark 15:34)". The Language Environment of First Century Judaea. Leiden-Boston: Brill. pp. 395–421. ISBN 9789004264410.
- Buth, Randall; Pierce, Chad (2014). "Hebraisti in Ancient Texts: Does Ἑβραϊστί Ever Mean Aramaic?". The Language Environment of First Century Judaea. Leiden-Boston: Brill. pp. 66–109. ISBN 9789004264410.
- Machiela, Daniel A. (2014). "Hebrew, Aramaic, and the Differing Phenomena of Targum and Translation in the Second Temple Period and Post-Second Temple Period". The Language Environment of First Century Judaea. Leiden-Boston: Brill. pp. 207–246. ISBN 9789004264410.
- Notley, Steven (2014). "Non-Septuagintal Hebraisms in the Third Gospel: An Inconvenient Truth". The Language Environment of First Century Judaea. Leiden-Boston: Brill. pp. 320–346. ISBN 9789004264410.
- Notley, Steven; Garcia, Jeffrey P (2014). "Hebrew-Only Exegesis: A Philological Approach to Jesus' Use of the Hebrew Bible". The Language Environment of First Century Judaea. Leiden-Boston: Brill. pp. 347–374. ISBN 9789004264410.
- Ruzer, Serge (2014). "Hebrew versus Aramaic as Jesus' Language: Notes on Early Opinions by Syriac Authors". The Language Environment of First Century Judaea. Leiden-Boston: Brill. pp. 182–205. ISBN 9789004264410.
- Turnage, Marc (2014). "The Linguistic Ethos of the Galilee in the First Century C.E.". The Language Environment of First Century Judaea. Leiden-Boston: Brill. pp. 110–181. ISBN 9789004264410.
