= My God, my God, why hast Thou forsaken me? =

Aramaic saying of Jesus on the cross

"My God, my God, why hast Thou forsaken me?" is a phrase that appears both in the Old Testament or Hebrew Bible, in the Book of Psalms, as well as in the New Testament of the Christian Bible, where they appear as one of the sayings of Jesus on the cross, according to Matthew 27:46 and also Mark 15:34.

These words are the opening words of Psalm 22 – in the original Hebrew: אֵלִ֣י אֵ֖לִי לָמָ֣ה עֲזַבְתָּ֑נִי Eli, Eli, lama azavtani, meaning 'My God, my God, why hast Thou forsaken me?'.

In the New Testament, the phrase is the only of the seven Sayings of Jesus on the cross that appears in more than one Gospel. It is given in slightly different version in the Gospel of Matthew, where it is transliterated into Greek as Ἠλί, Ἠλί, λεμὰ σαβαχθανί, whereas in the Gospel of Mark it is given as Ἐλωΐ, Ἐλωΐ, λαμὰ σαβαχθανί. The difference being the first two words being stated as Eli or as Eloi.

The Greek form σαβαχθανί in both accounts is the Greek transliteration of Aramaic שבקתני, transliterated: šəḇaqtani, meaning 'hast forsaken me'. It is a conjugated form of the verb šǝḇaq/šāḇaq, 'to allow, to permit, to forgive, and to forsake', with the perfect tense ending -t (2nd person singular: 'you'), and the object suffix -anī (1st person singular: 'me'). The Aramaic form שבק (šbq) 'abandon' corresponds to the Hebrew עזב (azav), also meaning 'leave, abandon'.

In Arabic, Jesus says: "Aloui, Aloui, limaa shabaqtani?", which means, "My God, my God, why have you forsaken me?" "Shabaqa" is an Arabic triconsonantal root which means 'to leave' or 'to neglect' someone in the Levantine dialect.

== New Testament narratives ==
Matthew ESV 27:46:

Around the ninth hour, Jesus shouted in a loud voice, saying "Eli, Eli, lema sabachthani?" which is, "My God, my God, why have you forsaken me?"

Mark ESV 15:34:

And at the ninth hour, Jesus shouted in a loud voice, "Eloi, Eloi, lama sabachthani?" which is translated, "My God, my God, why have you forsaken me?"

== Linguistic analysis ==
Overall, both versions can be said to be in Aramaic, rather than in Hebrew, because of the verb שבק (šbq) 'abandon', which exists only in Aramaic. The Biblical Hebrew counterpart to this word, עזב ('azab originally, rendered as azav in Modern Hebrew) is seen in the second line of the Old Testament's Psalm 22, which the saying appears to quote. Thus, Jesus is not quoting the canonical Hebrew version (ēlī ēlī lāmā 'azabtānī), attributed in some Jewish interpretations to King David himself, but rather the version in an Aramaic Targum (translation of the Bible). Surviving Aramaic Targums do use the verb šbq in their translations of the Psalm 22.

The word used in the Gospel of Mark for my god, Ἐλωΐ, corresponds to the Aramaic form אלהי, elāhī. The one used in Matthew, Ἠλί, fits in better with the אלי of the original Hebrew Psalm, but the form is attested abundantly in Aramaic as well.

In the next verse, in both accounts, some who hear Jesus's cry imagine that he is calling for help from Elijah (Ēlīyā in Aramaic).

Almost all ancient Greek manuscripts show signs of trying to normalize the two slightly different versions of Jesus's saying, presented in Mark and Matthew. For instance, the peculiar Codex Bezae renders both versions with ηλι ηλι λαμα ζαφθανι (ēli ēli lama zaphthani). The Alexandrian, Western and Caesarean textual families all reflect harmonization of the texts between Matthew and Mark. Only the Byzantine textual tradition preserves a distinction.

The Greek form σαβαχθανί in both accounts is the Greek transliteration of Aramaic שבקתני, transliterated: šəḇaqtani, meaning 'hast forsaken me'. It is a conjugated form of the verb šǝḇaq/šāḇaq, 'to allow, to permit, to forgive, and to forsake', with the perfect tense ending -t (2nd person singular: 'you'), and the object suffix -anī (1st person singular: 'me').

In Hebrew, the saying would be "אֵלִי אֵלִי, לָמָה עֲזַבְתָּנִי" (ēlī ēlī, lāmā 'azabtānī in Biblical Hebrew, eli eli lama azavtani in Modern Hebrew pronunciation), while the Syriac-Aramaic phrase according to the Peshitta would be Syriac: ܐܝܠܝ ܐܝܠܝ ܠܡܐ ܫܒܩܬܢܝ, romanized: ʔēl ʔēl lǝmā šǝḇaqtān (Matthew 27:46) or Syriac: ܐܠܗܝ ܐܠܗܝ ܠܡܢܐ ܫܒܩܬܢܝ, romanized: ʾalāh ʾalāh lǝmānā šǝḇaqtān (Mark 15:34).

== Interpretations ==
This saying is taken by some as an abandonment of the Son by the Father. Another interpretation holds that at the moment when Jesus took upon himself the sins of humanity, the Father had to turn away from the Son because the Father is "of purer eyes than to see evil and cannot look at wrong" (ESV). Jesus's expression of abandonment by God represents a cry of pain in a difficult circumstance rather than a loss of faith, with the following narrative in Matthew showing that God did not forsake Jesus.

Others see these words in the context of Psalm 22 and suggest that Jesus recited these words, perhaps even the whole psalm, "that he might show himself to be the very Being to whom the words refer; so that the Jewish scribes and people might examine and see the cause why he would not descend from the cross; namely, because this very psalm showed that it was appointed that he should suffer these things."

A different approach was suggested by Chiara Lubich, where forsakenness is seen as an element of inseparable reciprocity with respect to prayer "that all may be one" in John 17:21-23.
