= Shahzad Elahi =

Pakistani politician (born 1965)

Member of the Provincial Assembly of the Punjab

Personal details
- Born: 1 September 1965 (age 61) Lahore, Punjab, Pakistan
- Party: Pakistan Muslim League (Q)

Shahzad Elahi (Urdu: شہزاد الہی; born 1 September 1965) is a Pakistani politician from the Pakistan Muslim League (Q) political party who served as a member of the Provincial Assembly of the Punjab (MPA) from 2002 to 2007 and is an elected member the second time, since 2008 on a non-Muslim minority seat. During his tenure in the provincial assembly, he has functioned as the chairman of the Standing Committee on Housing, Urban Development and Public Health Engineering and is a member of the Finance Committee of the assembly.

A Christian by faith, Elahi resides in Lahore and holds a degree in mechanical engineering from the University of Engineering and Technology. In January 2012, Elahi said during an assembly speech that Punjab was becoming a "living hell" for minorities, pointing out recent incidents of Christian churches being demolished in the province.
