= Elahi Hamadani =

Mughal poet

Elahi Hamadani (Persian: الهی همدانی) was a 17th-century Iranian-born poet in the Mughal Empire, who wrote in Persian. He is the author of two unpublished works, a tazkira (collection of biographies) of 400 poets from between the 14th–16th centuries and a divan (collection of poems) numbering around 5,000 verses.

== Sources ==
- Hafezi, Mina (2020). "الهی همدانی". The Great Islamic Encyclopaedia (in Persian).
- Naim-Siddiqi, M. Asif (1998). "Elāhī Hamadānī, Sayyed Mīr ʿEmād-al-Dīn Maḥmūd". In Yarshater, Ehsan (ed.). Encyclopædia Iranica (Online ed.). Brill.
- White, James (2023). Persian and Arabic Literary Communities in the Seventeenth Century: Migrant Poets Between Arabia, Iran and India. I.B. Tauris. ISBN 978-0755644568.
