= Gheyb-e Elahi =

Gheyb-e Elahi غيب الهي
- Village
- Location within Iran
- Coordinates: 27°35′58″N 53°02′07″E
- Country: Iran
- Province: Fars
- County: Lamerd
- Bakhsh: Alamarvdasht
- Rural District: Alamarvdasht

Population (2006)
  - Total: 669
- Time zone: UTC+3:30 (IRST)
  - Summer (DST): UTC+4:30 (IRDT)

Gheyb-e Elahi (Persian: غيب الهي, also Romanized as Gheyb-e Elahī and Gheib Elahi; also known as Ghaib 'Alai, Gheyb‘alī, and Gheybollāhī) is a village in Alamarvdasht Rural District, Alamarvdasht District, Lamerd County, Fars province, Iran. At the 2006 census, its population was 669, in 124 families.
