= Illa (surname) =

Illa is a surname, Catalan Island. Notable people with the surname include:

- Esteban Terradas i Illa (1883–1950), Spanish mathematician, scientist, and engineer
- Rolando Illa (1880–1937), Cuban-Argentine chess player
- Salvador Illa (born 1966), Spanish politician
