= Ethyl lauroyl arginate =

Names
- IUPAC name Ethyl (2S)-5-(diaminomethylideneamino)-2-(dodecanoylamino)pentanoate
- Other names Ethyl N^{α}-lauroyl-L-arginate; Lauric arginate ethyl ester

Identifiers
| CAS Number | 48076-74-0 |
| 3D model (JSmol) | Interactive image |
| ChemSpider | 163603 |
| E number | E243 (preservatives) |
| PubChem CID | 188214 |
| UNII | E0K8J7A41B |
| CompTox Dashboard (EPA) | DTXSID60893076 |
- InChI: InChI=1S/C20H40N4O3/c1-3-5-6-7-8-9-10-11-12-15-18(25)24-17(19(26)27-4-2)14-13-16-23-20(21)22/h17H,3-16H2,1-2H3,(H,24,25)(H4,21,22,23)/t17-/m0/s1 Key: XJTMYVOVQZMMKX-KRWDZBQOSA-N
- SMILES: CCCCCCCCCCCC(=O)NC(CCCN=C(N)N)C(=O)OCC

Properties
| Chemical formula | C_{20}H_{40}N_{4}O_{3} |
| Molar mass | 384.565 g·mol^{−1} |
- Except where otherwise noted, data are given for materials in their standard state (at 25 °C [77 °F], 100 kPa). Infobox references

Ethyl lauroyl arginate HCl
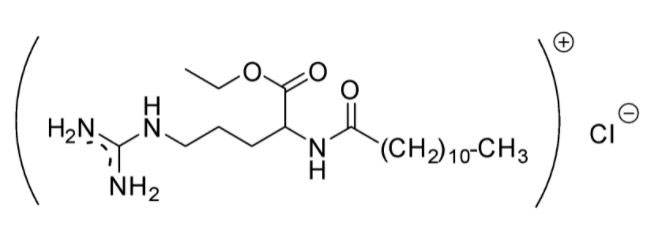

Names
- IUPAC name ethyl (2S)-5-(diaminomethylideneamino)-2-(dodecanoylamino)pentanoate;hydrochloride

Identifiers
| CAS Number | 60372-77-2 |
| 3D model (JSmol) | Interactive image |
| ChemSpider | 163603 |
| E number | E243 (preservatives) |
| PubChem CID | 25229630 |
| UNII | XPD6ZY79TB |
| CompTox Dashboard (EPA) | DTXSID60893076 |
- InChI: InChI=1S/C20H40N4O3.ClH/c1-3-5-6-7-8-9-10-11-12-15-18(25)24-17(19(26)27-4-2)14-13-16-23-20(21)22;/h17H,3-16H2,1-2H3,(H,24,25)(H4,21,22,23);1H/t17-;/m0./s1 Key: CUBZMGWLVMQKNE-LMOVPXPDSA-N
- SMILES: CCCCCCCCCCCC(=O)NC(CCCN=C(N)N)C(=O)OCC.Cl

Properties
| Chemical formula | C_{20}H_{41}ClN_{4}O_{3} |
| Molar mass | 421.02 g·mol^{−1} |
- Except where otherwise noted, data are given for materials in their standard state (at 25 °C [77 °F], 100 kPa). Infobox references

Ethyl lauroyl arginate (LAE) is a food preservative, antimicrobial compound, and drug more commonly known as E243.

It is used to treat dermatological disorders. It is usually chemically available in the form of a hydrochloride salt. LAE is an amino acid-based surfactant with broad-spectrum antimicrobial activity, high biodegradability and low toxicity. Due to these qualities, LAE is a preservative used in food and cosmetic formulations.

== History ==
The first synthesis of ethyl lauroyl arginate hydrochloride and its antimicrobial properties were reported in 1976. In the earlies 1980s, LAMIRSA together with Consejo Superior de Investigaciones Científicas (CSIC, Barcelona) began to investigate a new approach to the control of pathogens in food through the application of cationic surfactants based on natural building blocks that inhibit the proliferation of a huge variety of microorganisms, including Gram-positive and Gram-negative bacteria, moulds and yeasts. In 1995 LAMIRSA together with CSIC patented a new process to synthesize LAE.

== Description ==
LAE is a white solid, soluble in deionized water up to 247 g/kg at 20 °C with a melting point from 57 °C to 58 °C. Its partition coefficient between olive oil and water is 0.07; it allows LAE to be located in the water fraction, which is more susceptible to microbial contamination. This property gives LAE an advantage over other preservatives with a different chemical structure intended for the same applications.

LAE shows chemical stability at a pH range between 3 and 7 and maintains its antimicrobial activity in this interval.

== Applications in food and cosmetic industries ==
Its low toxicity and antimicrobial features make LAE a product with a wide application within the food and cosmetic preservation fields. MIRENAT is a range of formulated products based on LAE intended for the food industry. AMINAT is another range of formulated products based on LAE intended for the cosmetic industry.

MIRENAT range of products reduces the risk of food spoilage as it diminishes the presence of pathogens such as Listeria monocytogenes, Salmonella spp., and Escherichia coli. MIRENAT also prolongs the shelf life of food products because of its broad spectrum of activity against all types of microorganisms. Furthermore, it does not modify the organoleptic properties of the treated products.

The antimicrobial activity of LAE solutions applied in food has been widely studied. For instance, Luchansky et al. studied the preservation of commercially prepared ham using LAE solutions. Initially, hams were surface inoculated with a five-strain cocktail of Listeria monocytogenes (7 log_{10} CFU/ ham), added to shrink-wrap bags that already contained LAE, vacuum-sealed, and stored at 4 °C for 24 h. In samples treated with 2, 4, 6, and 8 mL of 5% Mirenat-N (i.e., 0.5% of LAE), pathogen levels decreased dramatically by 5.1, 5.4, and 5.5 log_{10} CFU/ham. In addition, samples treated with 8 mL of 5% Mirenat-N for 28 days of refrigerated storage still showed pathogen levels below the limit of detection (i.e., 1.48 log10). Similar assays were also conducted using an initial inoculum of 3 log_{10} CFU/ham. Here, samples treated with 2, 4, 6, and 8 mL of 5% Mirenat-N and stored at 4 °C for 24 h showed pathogen levels below the detection limit for all volumes assayed. Furthermore, samples treated with 6 and 8 mL of 5% Mirenat-N for 28 days of refrigerated storage still showed pathogen levels below the detection limit.

Soni et al. also studied the reduction of Listeria monocytogenes in cold-smoked salmon by LAE. The authors reported that treatment of cold-smoked salmon containing 3.5 log_{10} CFU/cm^{2} Listeria monocytogenes with LAE (200 ppm) showed strong listericidal action. Thus, treatment with 200 ppm LAE at 4 °C yielded 2.7 and 5.5 log_{10} CFU mL^{−1} reduction after 1 h and 4 h incubation, respectively. After 24 h incubation at 4 °C, no Listeria monocytogenes survival was recovered. At 30 °C, Listeria monocytogenes reductions were 3.8, 7.0, and 8.0 log_{10} CFU mL^{−1} after 1 h, 4 h, and 24 h incubation treatment, respectively.

AMINAT range of products are preservatives for personal care products such as cosmetic creams, lotions, body milks, hair conditioners, and sunscreen formulas or can be used as an active ingredient in soaps, anti-dandruff shampoos, deodorants, and oral care products. AMINAT combines a high antimicrobial efficacy with innocuousness, non-sensitizing, and non-skin irritating features. It also provides smoothness to skin and hair because of its cationic nature.

AMINAT is an environmentally acceptable cosmetic ingredient with the certifications Ecocert, Cosmos, and Natrue.

Vedeqsa scientists evaluated the activity of LAE in anti-dandruff applications. The authors performed suspension tests to compare the antimicrobial activity in vitro of several formulations against Malassezia furfur, yeast involved in the proliferation of dandruff. The results demonstrated that the action of the shampoo containing LAE was comparable to the shampoo containing the active zinc pyrithione and slightly superior to that of the shampoo containing the active piroctone olamine. In vivo assays were also performed. Thus, a dermatologist evaluated the dandruff severity of twenty volunteers before and after a four-week treatment. Shampoo containing LAE showed comparable or superior performance to the classic anti-dandruff active agents, with a better toxicological and eco-toxicological profile. The authors also evaluated the activity of LAE in anti-acne applications. Here, suspension tests were performed to compare the antimicrobial activity in vitro of several dermo-purifying gels against Propionibacterium acnes, a Gram-positive bacterium involved in acne formation. Results revealed that gels containing LAE had a quicker killing effect than gels containing other active ingredients such as salicylic acid or δ-gluconolactone. The in vivo activity of gel containing LAE was assayed in eleven volunteers with greasy and acne-prone skin for 28 days by applying 1 mL of the gel. The results showed a significant reduction in the number of pimples for each volunteer during the treatment. Furthermore, a 13.5% decrease in the average amount of sebum measured on volunteers showed a sebolytic effect of the gel containing LAE as an active.

== Periodontal diseases ==
LAE has potential in treating gingivitis, and the more advanced periodontitis. In a study comparing ethyl lauroyl arginate in 0.147% mouthwash to chlorhexidine 0.12% as an adjunctive therapy in the non-surgical treatment of periodontitis, the results showed there were no treatment-related adverse events. Total bacterial count and the specific pathogens were reduced at 4 weeks and 3 months by both mouthwashes with no statistical differences between them at neither periods of time. It was concluded that 0.147% LAE-containing mouthwash could be an alternative to the use of 0.12% chlorhexidine in the non-surgical therapy of periodontitis considering the similar clinical effects, more stable microbiological improvement and absence of adverse effects.

It is sold as the main active ingredient in Listerine Advanced Defence Gum Treatment and as one of the active ingredients in GUM Activital Mouthwash.

== Virucidal properties ==
Researchers from the Systems Immunity University Research Institute, Division of Infection & Immunity, School of Medicine in Cardiff, UK were studying the virucidal properties of several mouthwashes against SARS-CoV-2. The study, first published in November 2020, noted that mouthwashes containing LAE eradicated the virus completely, giving >5-log10 reduction in viral titres, surpassing the level required for EN14476.

"Two CPC-containing mouthwashes (Dentyl Dual Action and Dentyl Fresh Protect) and a mouthwash containing 23% v/v ethanol/LAE (Listerine Advanced DGT) eradicated the virus completely, giving >5-log10 reduction in viral titers and thus met EN14476 as a virucide." "Aqueous solutions of LAE below (3.3 mM) and above (9.9 mM) the critical micelle concentration (cmc, 4.9 mM), completely eradicated SARS-CoV2, mirroring the potent antiviral activity of Listerine Advanced DGT, which contains 3.3 mM LAE (Fig. 5B). This was seen with or without 23% ethanol inclusion, indicating that LAE is responsible for the antiviral activity of this product. To determine the potential effect of charge on molecular interactions with the viral lipid membrane, in addition to CPC and LAE (cationic surfactants), the effect of the anionic surfactant dodecylbenzensulfonate was tested and found to completely eradicate infectivity (Fig. 5B)."

The authors noted several studies on the impact of surfactant-based oral and nasal rinsing: "Furthermore, a recent small study suggested that oral rinsing could shorten hospital stay, whereas another study suggested that oral and nasal rinsing could reduce both disease and symptoms in health care professionals. Recently, World Health Organization included a recommendation that PVP-I could be used to reduce the risk of clinical transmission in dentistry."

== Mechanism of action ==
Due to its basic guanidine group, LAE is a cationic surfactant. The target of cationic surfactants is the bacterial cytoplasmic membrane, which carries a negative charge often stabilized by the presence of divalent cations such as Mg^{2+}and Ca^{2+}. Initially, the cationic surfactant crosses the cell wall (i.e., external cell envelopes) of bacteria. Then, the antimicrobial agent displays a high binding affinity for the outermost surface of the cytoplasmic membrane (i.e., inner cell envelope). Later, the cationic surfactant's alkyl chain penetrates into the membrane's hydrophobic core. This leads to a progressive leakage of cytoplasmic material, perturbating their metabolic processes, and the normal bacterial cycle is inhibited. Thus, cationic surfactants are considered a "membrane-active agent".

Dra. Manresa et al. investigated the effects caused by LAE in Salmonella typhymurium and Staphylococcus aureus. LAE caused disturbance in membrane potential and structural changes and loss of cell viability. However, no disruption of cells was detected. Similar effects were also observed on two food-related bacteria such as Yersina enterolitica and Lactobacillus plantarum. Here, flow cytometry, transmission electron microscopy, and potassium leakage assays demonstrated that LAE targets the cytoplasmic membrane causing loss of membrane potential and potassium ions.

== Antimicrobial properties ==
The following tables show the minimum inhibitory concentrations of LAE against different types of microorganisms, primarily pathogens, giving insight into LAE's broad spectrum antimicrobial activity and great effectiveness. Dr. Manresa evaluated the antimicrobial activity of LAE in the Faculty of Pharmacy of the University of Barcelona.

Further information concerning the antimicrobial properties of LAE is available at

== Regulatory status ==
On 1 September 2005, the United States Food and Drug Administration issued the No Objection Letter that LAE is Generally Recognized as Safe for use as an antimicrobial in several food categories at levels up to 200 ppm. Besides, the USDA (United States Department of Agriculture) approved its use in meat and poultry products. LAMIRSA submitted both petitions.

In July 2006 and ratified in July 2012, the Health Secretary of Mexico (Secretaría de Salud) published in its Official Journal that lauric arginate is an allowed substance to be used as a food additive for human consumption.

The EFSA (European Food Safety Authority) evaluated this new additive with a favorable opinion in April 2007 and, in July 2013, assigned it the number E-243. In May 2014, Regulation 506/2014 was published, authorizing a maximum dosage level of 160 ppm for its use in cooked meat products.

In August 2014, Health Canada amended the food legislation to include LAE as a preservative in various foods at a maximum dosage level of 200 ppm.

The Joint FAO/WHO Expert Committee on Food Additives (JECFA) evaluated LAE at its 69th meeting in June 2008. JECFA, a body dependent on WHO (World Health Organization), established an acceptable daily intake of 4 mg/Kg bw for the active material. Codex Alimentarius approved LAE use in several food matrixes up to 200 ppm in July 2011.

In March 2015, LAE was included in the IPA database (Inventory of Substances used as Processing Aids) of the CCFA (Codex Committee on Food Additives) as a processing aid in meat products, poultry, and game.

In March 2016, the CCFA issued a positive evaluation of LAE use in several food categories of meat and poultry. In July 2016, the Codex Alimentarius Commission included these approvals at the 39th meeting.

During the 50th session of the CCFA in March 2018, the proposed uses in food categories of fishery products were accepted. It is expected to be approved by Codex Alimentarius Commission at its 41st meeting scheduled for July 2018.

Other countries where the use of lauric arginate is also approved are Colombia (October 2009), Australia and New Zealand (April 2010), Vietnam (November 2012), Chile (August 2013), Israel (November 2014), Turkey (November 2013) and United Arab Emirates (April 2015), India (2011).

Most recently, the Food Safety and Standards Authority of India (FSSAI) included in 2018 similar uses and food categories previously recognized by CODEX in 2011. Finally, a request for the use of LAE as a processing aid antimicrobial treatment on raw meat was made to the Government of Canada (Health Canada), resulting in a Letter Of No Objection (LONO) issued in December 2022.

In addition to food applications, LAE has notable properties to be used as a cosmetic preservative/active ingredient for a wide range of cosmetic products.

As a cosmetic preservative, LAE was approved in the EU in 2009 according to the Cosmetic Directive to be used up to 0.4% for cosmetic products (except for lips, oral, and spray products) and up to 0.15% in mouthwashes (not children < 10 years). As an active cosmetic ingredient, it was also approved to be used up to 0.8% in soaps, anti-dandruff shampoos, and deodorants (not in spray).

In the same way as EU approval for cosmetic applications, LAE is also confirmed to be used in the US, Mexico, Canada, Australia, New Zealand, South Korea, and Japan, with similar applications and reference doses.

In conjunction with its antimicrobial features, the low toxicity makes LAE a product with a wide application within the food and cosmetics preservation fields. The addition of LAE means an important technological innovation toward manufacturing products with better preservation qualities.

== Metabolic and toxicological studies ==
To many customers, the claim, "no preservative added", often has the false connotation of improved quality. However, proper use of food preservatives can benefit the safety and quality of food.

A series of toxicological experiments carried out by Huntingdon Life Science, Ltd. confirmed the safety of LAE tests, included the metabolism of LAE in animals and humans, mutagenic, acute, subchronic, chronic, reproductive, and developmental toxicity. The results of these studies have been published in the prestigious scientific journal Food Chemical Toxicology.

=== Metabolism-Toxicokinetics of LAE ===
Rats were administered an oral dose of ^{14}C-LAE (arginine portion of LAE uniformly radio-labeled) to assess the absorption, distribution, metabolism, and excretion (ADME) of LAE.

Once ^{14}C -LAE was administered to rats, the biotransformation of LAE was followed through the absorption and excretion rates. The excretion rates were determined through the analysis of urine, faeces, and air exhalation, the routes of radioactivity elimination from the body. The following figure (Figure 1) summarises the excretion of radioactivity and the percentage retained in the carcass:

The results in Figure 1 show that approximately 50% of the ^{14}C -LAE administered was absorbed and remained in the carcass of rats, including the liver and gastrointestinal tract.

The next task was to identify and quantify the specific radioactive compounds present in the rats' plasma and define the toxicokinetics based on an in vivo study of metabolism.

Figure 2 reports the percentage of radioactive compounds present in samples of plasma extracted over 4.5 hours after administering ^{14}C-LAE to rats. LAE is rapidly metabolised to N^{α}-lauroyl-L-arginine (LAS) and then to arginine, which is more slowly metabolised to ornithine. Ornithine is transformed into endogenous products via the urea and citric acid cycles.

The metabolism experiments' results help to establish a biotransformation mechanism for LAE after ingestion. Figure 3 is the proposed pathway of LAE degradation by which it is rapidly hydrolyzed either by loss of the lauroyl side chain to form arginine ethyl ester and/or cleavage of the ethyl ester to form N^{α}-lauroyl-L-arginine (LAS).

Further hydrolysis of either intermediate results in the generation of arginine, which is then further hydrolyzed to ornithine and urea. Ornithine can be incorporated into the organisms via the urea and citric acid cycles until final degradation to CO_{2}. This metabolic pathway (Figure 4) and the supporting data were presented to the ISSX International Congress in Munich in 2001.
