= Solomonilla =

Scientific classification
- Kingdom: Animalia
- Phylum: Arthropoda
- Class: Insecta
- Order: Diptera
- Family: Tachinidae
- Subfamily: Dexiinae
- Tribe: Voriini
- Genus: Solomonilla; Özdikmen, 2007

Type species
- Illa mirabilis Baranov, 1938

Synonyms
- Illa Baranov, 1938

Genus of flies

Solomonilla is a genus of flies in the family Tachinidae.

== Species ==
- Solomonilla mirabilis (Baranov, 1938)

== Distribution ==
Solomon Islands.
