= Fazal Elahi Khan =

Pakistani politician

MPA Fazal Elahi Khan

Parliamentary Secretary in Environmental Department
- In office 3 September 2013 – 28 May 2018

Member of the Khyber Pakhtunkhwa Assembly
- In office 13 August 2018 – 18 January 2023
- Constituency: PK-79 (Peshawar-XIV)
- In office 31 May 2013 – 28 May 2018
- Constituency: PK-06 (Peshawar-VI)

Personal details
- Born: Peshawar, Khyber Pakhtunkhwa, Pakistan
- Party: PTI (2013-present)
- Occupation: Politician

Fazal Elahi Khan (Pashto: فضل الہی خان) is a Pakistani politician from Peshawar District, who served as a member of the Provincial Assembly of Khyber Pakhtunkhwa from May 2013 to May 2018 and from August 2018 to January 2023, belonging to the Pakistan Tehreek-e-Insaf. He also served as the Parliamentary Secretary in Environmental Department.

== Political career ==
Fazal Elahi was elected as the member of the Khyber Pakhtunkhwa Assembly on ticket of Pakistan Tehreek-e-Insaf from PK-06 (Peshawar-VI) in the 2013 Pakistani general election.
