= Choqa Elahi =

Choqa Elahi چقاالهي
- Village
- Location within Iran
- Coordinates: 34°30′23″N 46°43′52″E
- Country: Iran
- Province: Kermanshah
- County: Kermanshah
- Bakhsh: Kuzaran
- Rural District: Sanjabi

Population (2006)
  - Total: 125
- Time zone: UTC+3:30 (IRST)
  - Summer (DST): UTC+4:30 (IRDT)

Choqa Elahi (Persian: چقاالهي, also Romanized as Choqā Elāhī and Cheqā Elāhī; also known as Cheqālahī, Cheqālā’ī, and Chellai) is a village in Sanjabi Rural District, Kuzaran District, Kermanshah County, Kermanshah province, Iran. At the 2006 census, its population was 125, in 33 families.
