= Elahi Ardabili =

Iranian author and scholar

- Occupation(s): Author and scholar
- Known for: Religious teachings and translations

Elahi Ardabili (Persian: الهی اردبیلی, Kamāl al-Dīn Ḥusayn al-Ilāhī al-Ardabīlī; died 1543 CE) was an Iranian author and scholar.

== Early life and education ==
Elahi was born in Ardabil. After completing his preliminary education, he moved to Shiraz and Khorasan with the help of Shaykh Haydar and completed his education in the presence of the great scholars of his era, Jalaladdin Davani and Amir Ghiasaddin Shirazi.

He spent some years in Herat with Ali-Shir Nava'i and Prince Gharib Mirza Valad Soltan Mirza. After Prince Gharib's death, Elahi returned to Azerbaijan. In Ardabil he began teaching Islamic science and teachings and died in 1543 in Ardabil.

== Career highlights ==
He was the first scholar to translate writings of Shia Islam into the Persian language. He is the author of more than 30 books in Turkish, Arabic and Persian. He has written interpretations of the Qur'an in Persian and Arabic.
