= Illa (Arabic) =

The Arabic word illa is a negative word corresponding to the English except, only and but.

== Use ==
It is an often recurring phrase in the Qur'an, often used to give strength to statements by first negating all possibilities, and then referring to a subject. For example, in the Islamic Creed (Arabic: Shahada):

- Arabic text:

- أشهد أن لا إله إلاَّ لله ، وأشهد أن محمدًا رسول الله

- Romanization:

- 'ašhadu 'al-lā ilāha illā-llāh

- English translations:

- I testify that there is no god but God.

This can also be seen in the prayer La hawla wa la quwwata illa billah, There is neither change nor power except by means of God.

== See also ==
- Negation in Arabic
