= Karam Elahi Bandial =

Pakistani politician (born 1961)

Member of the Provincial Assembly of the Punjab
- In office 2008 – 31 May 2018

Personal details
- Born: 1 May 1961 (age 65) Khushab, Punjab, Pakistan
- Party: PMLN

Punjab Assembly Lahore

Karam Elahi Bandial is a Pakistani politician who was a Member of the Provincial Assembly of the Punjab, from 2008 to May 2018.

== Early life and education ==
He was born on 1 May 1961 in Khushab.

He graduated in 1981 from Government College, Lahore and has a degree of Bachelor of Arts.

== Political career ==
He ran for the seat of the Provincial Assembly of the Punjab as an independent candidate from Constituency PP-40 (Khushab-II) in the 2002 Pakistani general election, but was unsuccessful. He received 24,307 votes and lost the seat to Malik Saleh Muhammad Ganjial, a candidate of National Alliance.

He was elected to the Provincial Assembly of the Punjab as an independent candidate from Constituency PP-40 (Khushab-II) in the 2008 Pakistani general election. He received 26,494 votes and defeated Malik Hassan Nawaz Gunjial, an independent candidate.

He was re-elected to the Provincial Assembly of the Punjab as a candidate of Pakistan Muslim League (N) (PML-N) from Constituency PP-40 (Khushab-II) in the 2013 Pakistani general election. He received 45,854 votes and defeated Muhammad Saleh Muhammad Ganjial, an independent candidate.
