= Catherine Hezser =

Catherine Hezser is Professor of Jewish Studies at the School of Oriental and African Studies, University of London. She specialises in rabbinic Judaism, the early history of Judaism in the Near Middle East, and the social history of the Jews in Roman Palestine during late antiquity.

== Education ==
Hezser received her PhD from the Jewish Theological Seminary of America in 1992. Her doctoral thesis was Form, Function, and Historical Significance of the Rabbinic Story in Yerushalmi Neziqin. This was published the following year by Mohr Siebeck as a monograph. Before her PhD, she studied Jewish Studies, Theology and Philosophy at the universities of Münster and Heidelberg.

== Career and research ==
Hezser was a Senior Research Fellow at Kings College Cambridge, 1992-94 where she worked on a project on early Judaism and Christianity with Keith Hopkins. She received her Habilitation in 1997 from the Freie Universität Berlin. She was a Yad Hanadiv - Rothberg Foundation Fellow at Hebrew University of Jerusalem, and was then awarded a Heisenberg Professorship by the Deutsche Forschungsgemeinschaft. She was the Al and Felice Lippert Professor of Jewish Studies at Trinity College Dublin 2000-05, whilst also serving as the Director of the Herzog Centre for Jewish and Near Eastern Religions and Cultures. She has been at SOAS since 2005.

Hezser was visiting professor at the Faculty of Theology, University of Oslo in 2020. She has written, edited, and co-edited 15 books. In 2020, a petition supported a campaign to save her job as the only Chair in Jewish Studies at SOAS.

== Bibliography ==
- with Diana Edelman (eds.) (2021) The Use and Dissemination of Religious Knowledge in Antiquity. Sheffield: Equinox
- (ed.) (2020) The Oxford Handbook of Jewish Daily Life in Roman Palestine. Oxford: Oxford University Press
- (2018) Bild und Kontext. Jüdische und christliche Ikonographie der Spätantike. Tübingen: Mohr Siebeck
- (2017) Rabbinic Body Language: Non-Verbal Communication in Palestinian Rabbinic Literature of Late Antiquity. Leiden; Boston, MA: Brill
- with Uzi Leibner (eds.) (2016) Jewish Art in Its Late Antique Context. Tuebingen: Mohr Siebeck
- (2011) Jewish Travel in Antiquity. Tuebingen: Mohr-Siebeck
- (ed.) (2010) The Oxford Handbook of Jewish Daily Life in Roman Palestine. Oxford: Oxford University Press
- (2005) Jewish Slavery in Antiquity. Oxford: Oxford University Press
- (ed.) (2003) Rabbinic Law in Its Roman and Near Eastern Context. Tuebingen: Mohr-Siebeck
- (ed.) (2002) Representing the Shoah for the 21st Century. Tuebingen: Mohr-Siebeck
- (2001) Jewish Literacy in Roman Palestine. Tuebingen: Mohr-Siebeck
- with Peter Schaefer (eds.) (2000) The Talmud Yerushalmi and Graeco-Roman Culture. Vol. 2. Tuebingen: Mohr-Siebeck
- (1997) The Social Structure of the Rabbinic Movement in Roman Palestine. Tuebingen: Mohr-Siebeck
- (1993) Form, Function, and Historical Significance of the Rabbinic Story in Yerushalmi Neziqin. Tuebingen: Mohr-Siebeck.
- (1990) Lohnmetaphorik und Arbeitswelt. Das Gleichnis von den Arbeitern im Weinberg (Mt. 20:1-16) im Rahmen rabbinischer Lohngleichnisse. Goettingen: Vandenhoeck & Ruprecht.
