= Elahi =

Aramaic word meaning "My God"

Elahi (אֱלָהִי) is an Aramaic word meaning "My God". Elah means "god", with the suffix -i meaning "my." Being Aramaic and not Hebrew (there is no singular possessive for "god" in Biblical Hebrew), in the Old Testament, Elahi is found only in the books of Ezra and Daniel. It is best known for its transliteration in Mark 15:34, "ἐλωΐ ἐλωΐ" eloi eloi.

== Christian use ==
Some scholars believe Elahi may be the name of God that Jesus vocalized in his last words on the cross. Science historian Livio Catullo Stecchini and Jan Sammer write, "The limits of Mark‘s knowledge of Hebrew are revealed by the sentence Elo[h]i Elo[h]i Lama Sabachthani which he puts into the mouth of Jesus. It is a confused rendering into Greek lettering of the text of Psalm 22:2, (Note: By Masoretic numbering. In versions where the colophon is not counted, 22:1.) which reads in Hebrew eli eli lama azabtani and in Aramaic elahi elahi lema sebaqtani."

== See also ==
- Aramaic of Jesus
- Elohim
- Allah
- Semitic Languages
