= Bijoy Jain =

Indian architect and Norman R (born 1965)

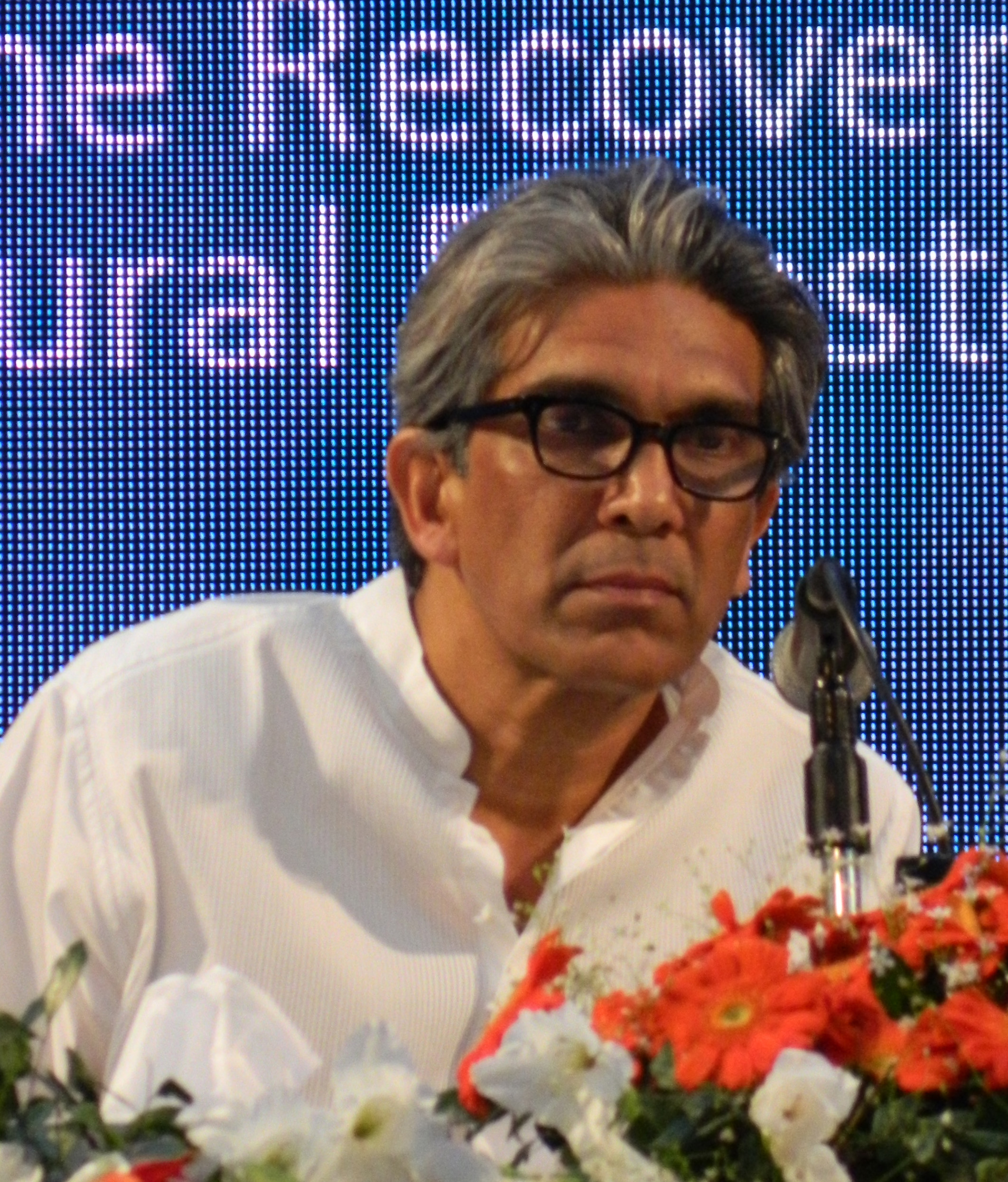
- Jain at CAA Conference 2013, Dhaka
- Born: 1965 (age 60–61); Mumbai
- Occupation: Architect
- Awards: Global Award for Sustainable Architecture
- Practice: Studio Mumbai

Bijoy Jain (born 1965) is an Indian architect and Norman R. Foster Visiting professor at Yale University.

== Biography ==
Bijoy Jain grew up in Mumbai and studied architecture at Washington University in St. Louis until 1990 and worked in Richard Meier office at Los Angeles and London between 1989 and 1995. He returned to India in 1995 and founded his own firm Studio Mumbai. Bijoy Jain was invited by Alejandro Aravena to the Venice Architecture Biennale in 2016 and to the ETH Zurich as a guest critic by Raphael Zuber in 2018.

== Awards ==
- 2009: Global Award for Sustainable Architecture from L’Institut Francais D’Architecture
- 2009: Design for Asia Award from the Hong Kong Design Center
- 2009: Nomination – Aga Khan Award for Architecture for Palmyra-Haus, Nandgaon
- 2012: Swiss Architectural Award
- 2020: Alvar Aalto Medal

== Publications ==
- 2023: See All This Art Magazine #32 Make yourself a home
