= Opera Village Africa =

Arts education project in Ouagadougou, Burkina Faso

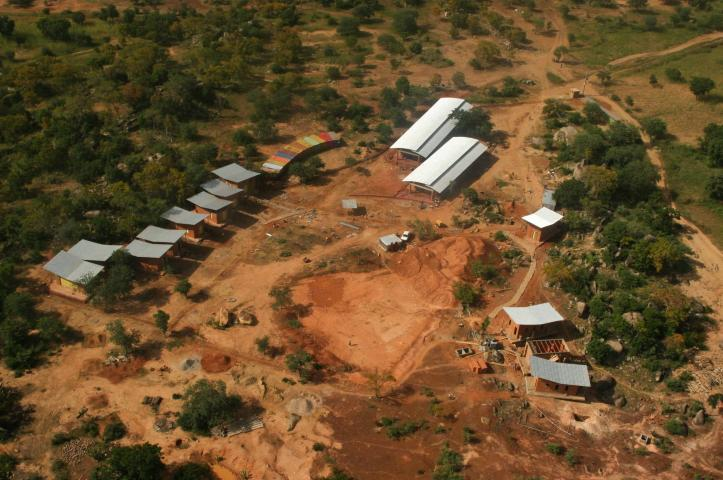
Aerial view

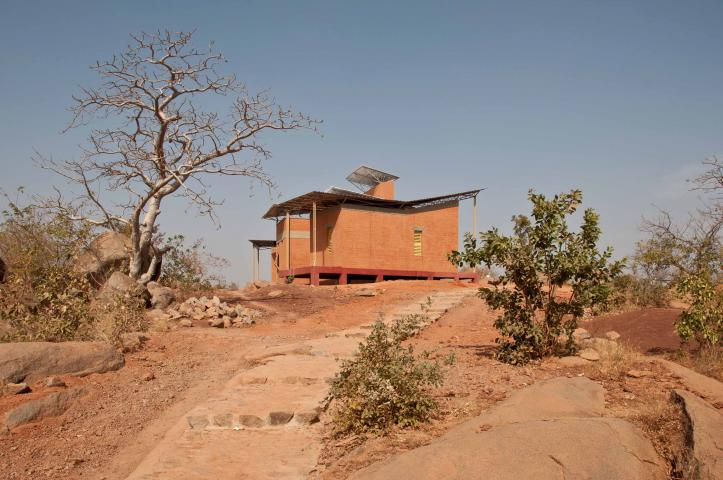
Teachers' houses

Opera Village Africa (French: Village-Opéra Afrique, German: Operndorf Afrika) is an arts education project located in Ouagadougou, the capital city of Burkina Faso. It was initiated by the German film and theatre director, actor, and artist, Christoph Schlingensief. It is operated by Festspielhaus Afrika as a non-profit GmbH (limited company) based in Germany. The first phase was completed in November 2011.

== Concept ==
The Opera Village's artistic projects are developed by people who are committed to the Opera Village and who develop themselves further in this process. Already during its initial phase, the Opera Village provides a space in which cultural encounters, workshops and exchange take place. Since the end of 2012, theatre performances, film shows and storytelling evenings have been taking place regularly; actual opera is not part of the curriculum.

== Buildings ==
To realise the project, in the year 2008 Christoph Schlingensief brought on board architect and development activist Diébédo Francis Kéré, who was born in Burkina Faso. Kéré brings together a traditional building style with ecological and sustainable concepts using sustainable materials. The buildings are built by the local population who have undergone construction training. Here, Kéré also places value on air conditioning, achieving cooling by using his specially developed construction materials. In 2010, the foundation stone was laid and the area was connected to the public water system and electricity grid. 2011 saw the opening of 16 buildings including the primary school, which takes on 50 new pupils every year. In addition to school subjects, the children are also taught film, art and music classes.

In April 2012, building work began on the hospital consisting of a primary medical care unit, a maternity ward and a dental care unit. It was opened in 2014. So that the Opera Village is able to attain long-term self-sufficiency, an alternative energy supply was installed for the hospital in the form of a solar energy plant which is to be installed in 2015. A football pitch has already been completed and a children's play area was supposed to be added in 2013. The "Festspielhaus" – a place of cultural encounter – at the centre of the grounds is planned to form the heart of the project.
