= Elisa Valero =

Spanish architect and professor

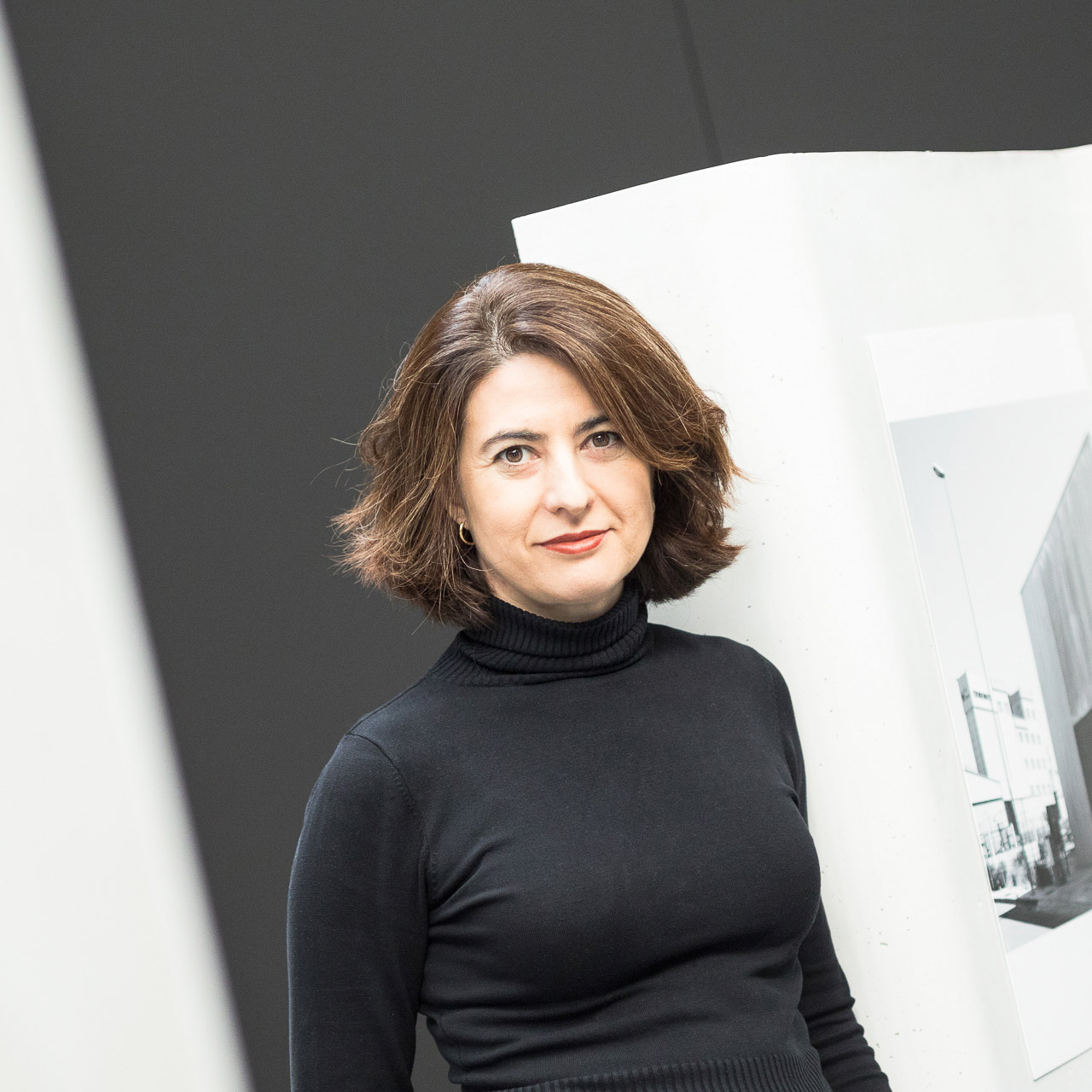
Elisa Valero

Elisa Valero Ramos is a Spanish architect and professor at the High Technical Architecture School of the University of Granada (UGR). Her work has been recognized in 2018 with the Swiss Architectural Award.

== Biography ==
=== Education ===
She studied architecture at the High Technical Architecture School of the University of Valladolid (UVa), where she won the prize for the best academic record of the 1995-96 course and she graduated in 1996 with an Extraordinary End-of-Degree Award. In 2000 she received her doctorate in architecture from the UGR; Later, she received a scholarship from the Academy of Spain in Rome in 2003.

=== Career ===
In 1996 she moved to Mexico to teach at the National Autonomous University of Mexico (UNAM); here she completed her first assignment, the rehabilitation of the Los Manantiales restaurant in Xochimilco by architect Félix Candela.

Since 1997 she has worked in the studio that bears her name, in Granada.

Since 2012 she is professor of Architectural Design at the High Technical Architecture School of the University of Granada, becoming the third female professor of Architectural Design in the history of Spain. In the same university, she leads the research group RNM909 "Efficient Housing and Urban Recycling"; she has carried out several projects related to architectural recycling and sustainability, researching new low-cost and low-energy construction systems.

Other lines of research she develops are about light in architecture and architecture for children, especially in pediatric hospitals. Since 2012, she has worked with the Aladina Foundation, a Spanish foundation that seeks to improve the lives of children with cancer.

She has supervised several PhD theses and research projects and is the author of nearly 200 works, including conference proceedings, book chapters and articles in scientific journals.

She is a visiting professor at the Academy of Architecture in Mendrisio.

== Main publications ==
- Housing, Melfi Libria, 2018
- Light in Architecture: The Intangible Material, Londra, RIBA publishing, 2015.
- Glosario de reciclaje urbano, General de Ediciones de Arquitectura, 2014.
- Diccionario de la luz, General de Ediciones de Arquitectura, 2012.
- La materia intangible, reflexiones sobre la luz en el proyecto de arquitectura, General de Ediciones de Arquitectura, 2009.
- Elisa Valero arquitectura 1998-2008. Monografía de obra propia, General de Ediciones de Arquitectura, 2009.
- La Universidad laboral de Almería, Colegio Oficial de Arquitectos de Andalucía Oriental, 2008.
- Ocio peligroso, introducción al proyecto de arquitectura, General de Ediciones de Arquitectura, 2006.

== Architectural work ==
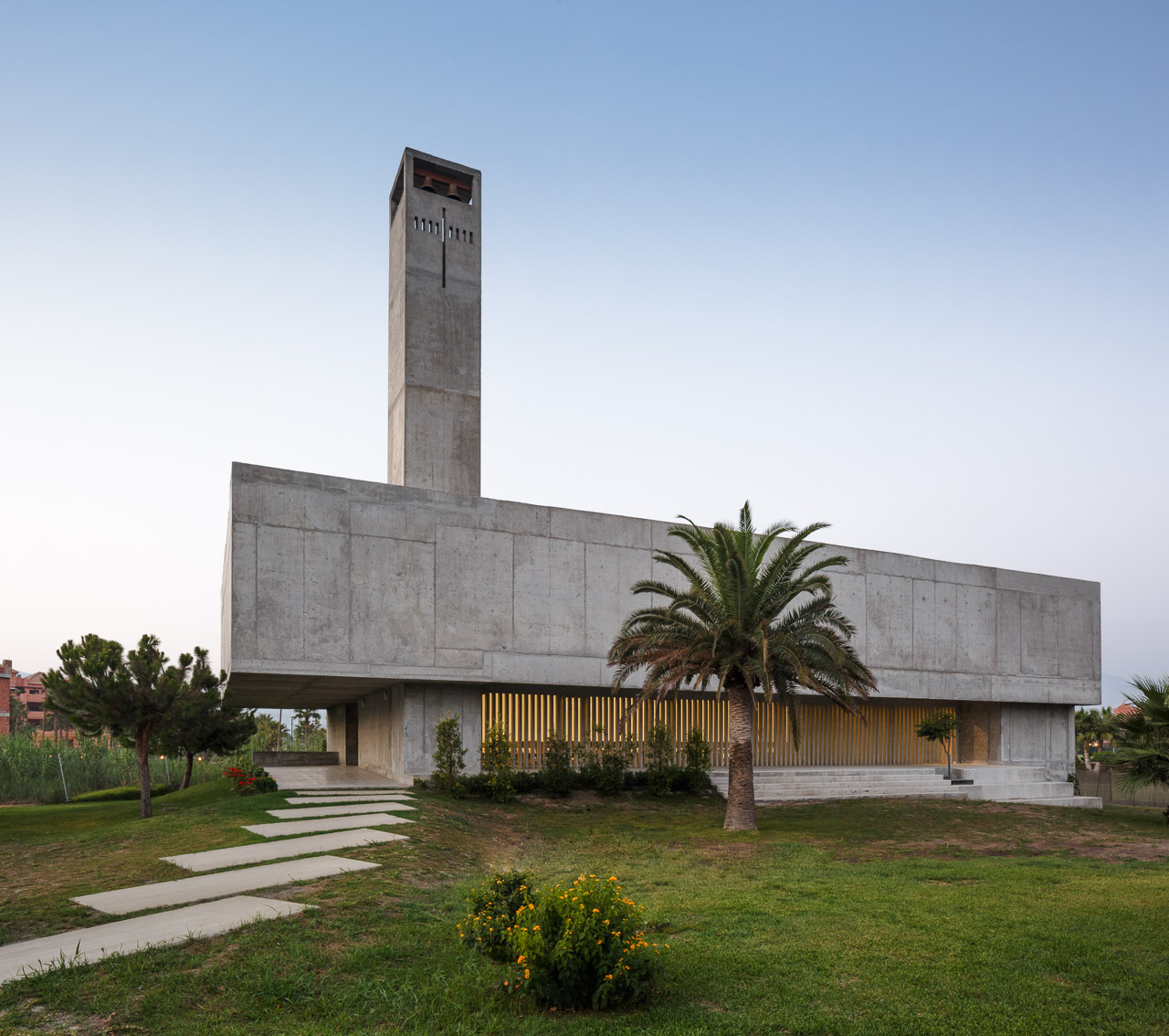
Church of Santa Josefina Bakhita in Playa Granada. Motril, Granada

- New Parent Room and refurbishment of Patio de los Valientes in Hospital Virgen del Rocío, Sevilla, 2019
- 8 experimental homes in Huertos de San Cecilio street, Granada, 2018
- Church of Saint Josephine Bakhita, in Playa Granada, Motril, 2016
- Children's school in the Serrallo neighborhood, Granada, 2011
- Art gallery Plácido Arango, Madrid, 2008
- Multipurpose social center in Lancha del Genil, Granada, 2006
- 13 self-built homes in Palenciana, Córdoba, 2003
- San Isidro House, bioclimatic housing in the historic center of Granada, 2003

== Awards and mentions ==
Among the awards received, there are the Honorable Mention of the arcVision Prize 2016, the Swiss Architectural Award 2017-2018 - first woman to win it - and the International Mention of the Prix des femmes architectes 2019. Other prizes are:

- Mention in the "Architecture" category at the ASCER Ceramics Awards (2019), for New Parent Room and refurbishment of Patio de los Valientes in Hospital Virgen del Rocío, Sevilla
- First Prize in the "Rehabilitation" category at the Tile Architecture Awards (2018) organized by HISPALYT, for the rehabilitation of the Exhibition Hall of the Santo Domingo Convent, Huéscar. In collaboration with Antonio Jiménez Torrecillas
- Finalist in the FAD Awards (2012) for the Children's school in the Serrallo neighborhood, Granada
- First Prize "Abitare il Mediterraneo" (2011) organized by the Regional Council of Architects of Sicily, in collaboration with UMAR (Union of Mediterranean Architects), under the patronage of CNAPPC (National Council of Architects, Town Planners, Landscape Architects and Restorers of Italy)
- Finalist IX Biennial of Spanish Architecture (2006) for the Multipurpose Social Center in Lancha del Genil, Granada
