= Swiss Architectural Award =

Architecture award

The Swiss Architectural Award is an international architecture award.

== History ==
The Swiss Architectural Award honors architects from all over the world whose work has made a significant contribution to contemporary architecture.

The Swiss Architectural Award was founded in 2007, is endowed with 100,000 Swiss francs and is awarded every two years to architects under the age of 50 who have completed at least three important works. Since the seventh edition (2020), the Swiss Architecture Prize has been sponsored by the Teatro dell'architettura Foundation, which inherited the BSI Architecture Foundation. The Chairman of the Teatro dell'architettura Foundation is Mario Botta. The prize is organized by the Università della Svizzera Italiana Mendrisio. Since 2024 the Award is supported by the Banca dello Stato del Cantone Ticino.

The jury consists of the chairman Mario Botta and other architects and architecture critics from USI Mendrisio, the EPFL Lausanne and the ETH Zurich. The nominees are selected by an international advisory board made up of architects and architecture critics.

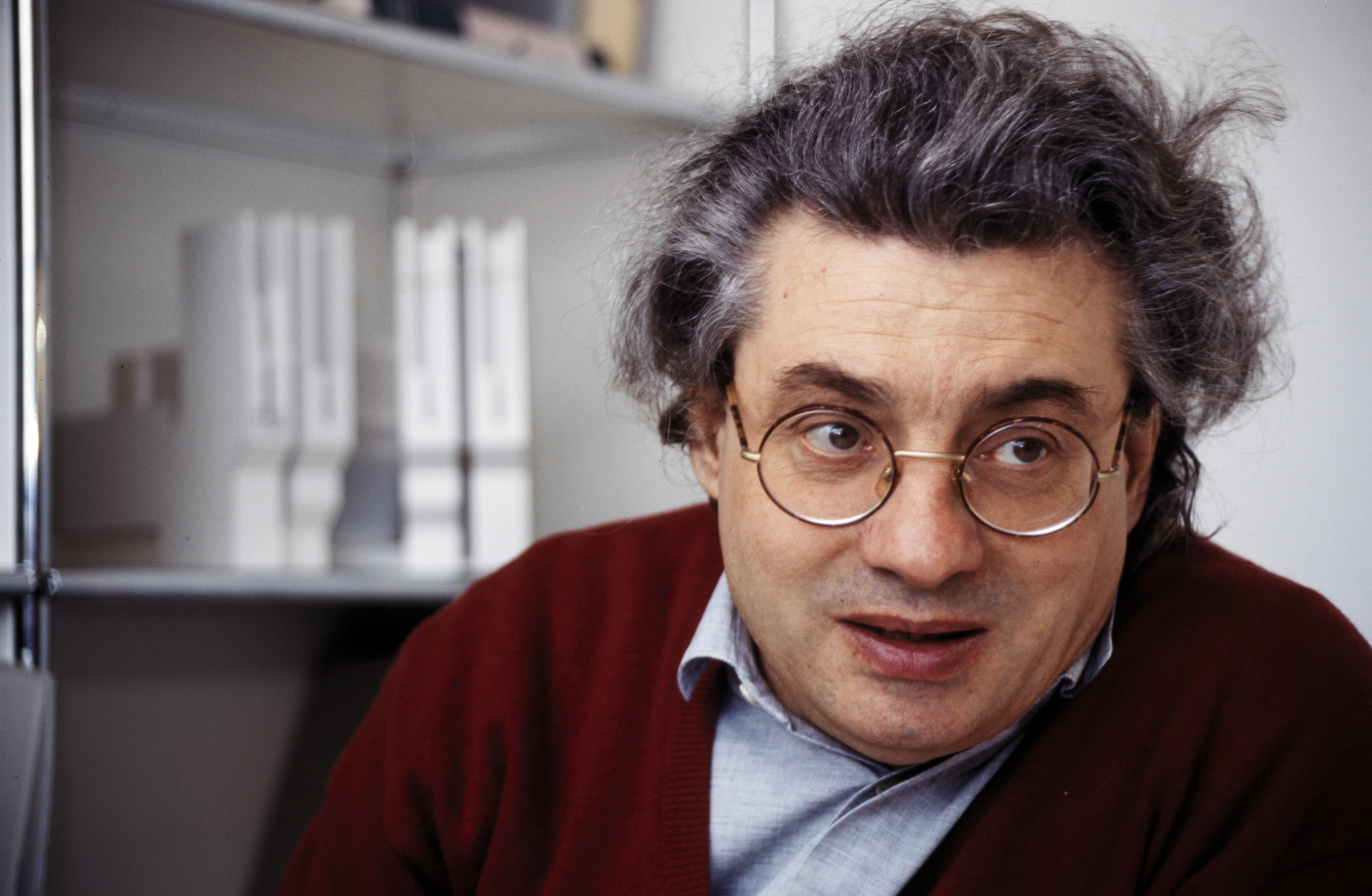
Mario Botta

== Prizewinner ==
=== 2022 ===
- Prizewinner: Xu Tiantian
- Nominees: Raphael Zuber, Atelier Masōmī – Mariam Kamara, Bernardo Bader, Barão Hutter, Giulio Basili, Bloco Arquitetos, Manuel Cervantes, dekleva gregoric architects, Domat, Estudio Flume, Estudio Macías Peredo, Graux & Baeyens, Grillovasiu, Go Hasegawa, Carla Juaçaba, Ryan Kennihan, LACOL Arquitectura Cooperativa, lopes brenna, Rozana Montiel, Nickisch Walder, RAMA estudio, Sugiberri, Ted’A Arquitectes, Terra+Tuma, Tropical Space, Xu Tiantian
- Advisory Board: Manuel Aires Mateus, Solano Benitez, Angelo Bucci, Marianne Burkhalter, Sean Godsell, Jun'ya Ishigami, Shelley McNamara, Valerio Olgiati, András Pálffy, Elisa Valero, Paolo Zermani
- Jury: Mario Botta (chairman), Walter Angonese, Stéphanie Bru, Dieter Dietz, Tom Emerson, Nicola Navone (Secretary)

=== 2020 ===
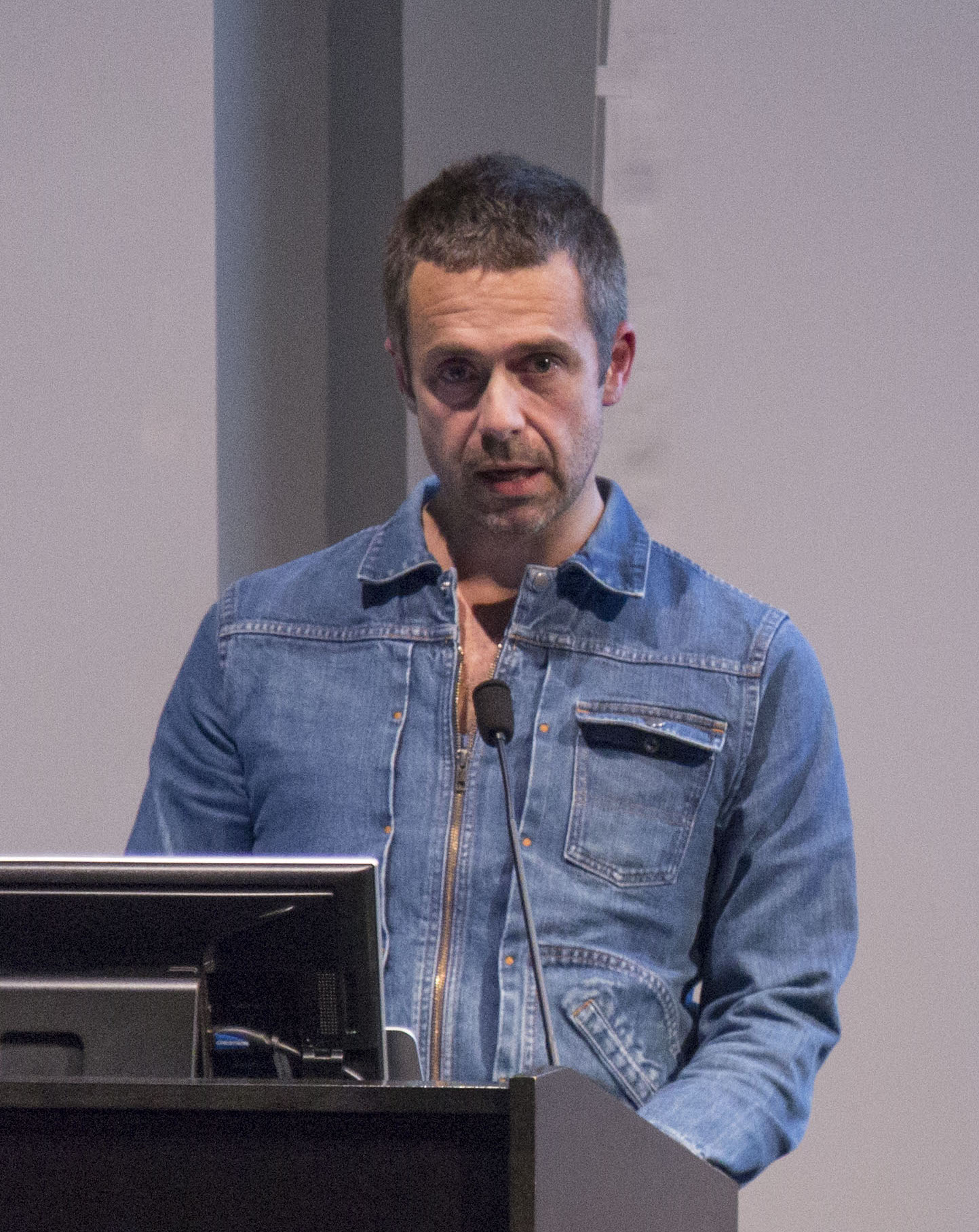
Alexandre Thériot

- Prizewinner: Bruther (Stéphanie Bru & Alexandre Thériot)
- Nominees: Al Borde, Arrhov Frick, Bernardo Bader, Barbas Lopes Arquitectos, Tatiana Bilbao, Bruther, Riccardo Butini, Carmody Groarke, Ricardo Carvalho, Kashef Mahboob Chowdhury / URBANA, DECA Architecture, Angela Deuber, Edition Office, Estudio MMX, Nick Gelpi, Guidotti Architekten, Carla Juaçaba, langarita-navarro arquitectos, MAPA, Shingo Masuda + Katsuhisa Otsubo, Daniel Moreno Flores, Erika Nakagawa, OFFICE KGDVS, Camilo Rebelo, RAW – Robust Architecture Workshop, Sabin Blanco Architects, SIAA_, Taylor and Hinds Architects, Ted’A Arquitectes, Terra+Tuma, Francesca Torzo, Christian Wassmann, Xu Tiantian - DnA Design and Architecture
- Advisory Board: Manuel Aires Mateus, Solano Benitez, Angelo Bucci, Marianne Burkhalter, Sean Godsell, Steven Holl, Junya Ishigami, Bijoy Jain, Shelley McNamara, Valerio Olgiati, Adolph Stiller, Elisa Valero, Paolo Zermani
- Jury: Mario Botta (chairman), Riccardo Blumer, João Luís Carrilho da Graça, Dieter Dietz, Christophe Girot, Nicola Navone (Secretary)

=== 2018 ===
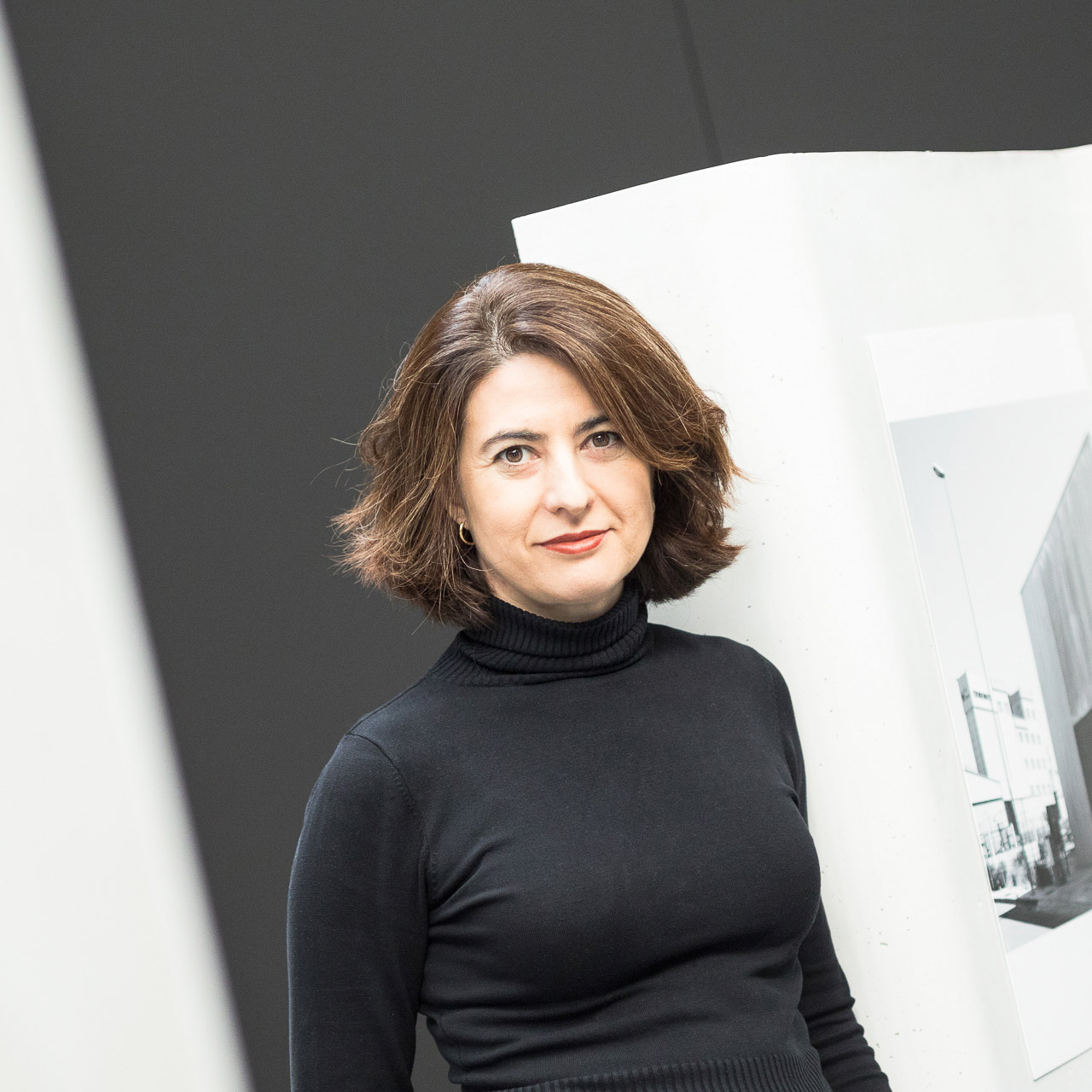
Elisa Valero

- Prizewinner: Elisa Valero
- Nominees: Al Borde, Arquitetos Associados, Barozzi Veiga, Baserga Mozzetti, Baukuh, Fernanda Canales, ChartierDalix, José Cubilla, Frida Escobedo, Gong Dong / Vector Architects, H + F Arquitetos, Anna Heringer, Akihisa Hirata, Anne Holtrop, Hua Li / TAO, Trace Architecture Office, Kumiko Inui, Carla Juaçaba, Anssi Lassila / OOPEAA – Office for Peripheral Architecture, Li Zhang / TeamMinus, Ling Hao, Rozana Montiel, Daniel Moreno Flores, onishimaki + hyakudayuki Architekten, Orkidstudio Architects, Oualalou + Choi, PAO – Volksarchitekturbüro, James Russell, Sami Arquitectos, SO-IL, Marina Tabassum, TNA Architects, Elisa Valero
- Advisory Board: Solano Benitez, Ole Bouman, Angelo Bucci, Gonçalo Byrne, Jean-Louis Cohen, Luis Fernandez Galiano, Sean Godsell, Toyo Ito, Bijoy Jain, Shelley McNamara, Valerio Olgiati, José Maria Sanchez Garcia, Li Xiaodong
- Jury: Mario Botta (chairman), Riccardo Blumer, An Fonteyne, Diébédo Francis Kéré, Paolo Tombesi, Nicola Navone (Secretary)

=== 2016 ===
- Prizewinner: Jun'ya Ishigami
- Nominees: Andrade Morettin Arquitetos, Alejandro Aravena / Elemental, Arquitecturia, Eduardo Castillo, Kashef Mahboob Chowdhury / URBANA, Santiago Cirugeda / Recetas Urbanas, DRDH Architects, Sou Fujimoto, HARQUITECTES, Go Hasegawa, Grainne Hassett / Hassett Ducatez Architects, Anna Heringer, Anne Holtrop, Hua Li - TAO, Trace Architecture Office, Jun Igarashi, Sebastián Irarrázaval, Junya Ishigami, Alexia León, Inês Lobo, Made in, Mokena Makeka / Makeka Design Lab, O-office Architects, OUALALOU + CHOI, Pezo von Ellrichshausen, Productora, Sami Arquitectos, Vo Trong Nghia, Zecc Architects
- Advisory Board: Solano Benitez, Ole Bouman, Gonçalo Byrne, Luis Fernández-Galiano, Sean Godsell, Toyo Ito, Bijoy Jain, Diébédo Francis Kéré, Xiaodong Li, Shelley McNamara, Paulo Mendes da Rocha, Valerio Olgiati, Smiljan Radic
- Jury: Mario Botta (chairman), Jean-Louis Cohen, Marc Collomb, Bruno Reichlin, José María Sánchez García, Nicola Navone (Secretary)

=== 2014 ===
- Prizewinner: José María Sánchez García
- Nominees: Raphael Zuber, Boyd Cody Architects, Arno Brandlhuber, Tom de Paor, Anne Feenstra, Toni Gironès, Hall McKnight, Go Hasegawa, Akihisa Hirata, Hollmén Reuter Sandman, Höweler + Yoon Architecture, Kumiko Inui, Johnstonmarklee, Carla Juaçaba, Lassila Hirvilammi Architects / OOPEAA, Office for Peripheral Architecture, LTL Architects, MAP Studio – Magnani Pelzel Associated Architects, onishimaki + hyakudayuki architects, Sameep Padora, Smiljan Radic, Camilo Restrepo, Rintala Eggertsson Architects, Mauricio Rocha, Sergison Bates Architects, Studio Weave, TYIN tegnestue Architects Trondheim
- Advisory Board: Solano Benitez, Barry Bergdoll, Ole Bouman, Luis Fernández-Galiano, Sean Godsell, Toyo Ito, Diébédo Francis Kéré, Shelley McNamara, Rahul Mehrotra, Mohsen Mostafavi, Valerio Olgiati, Eduardo Souto de Moura
- Jury: Mario Botta (chairman), Alberto Campo Baeza, Marc Collomb, Charles Kleiber, Bruno Reichlin, Nicola Navone (Secretary)

=== 2012 ===
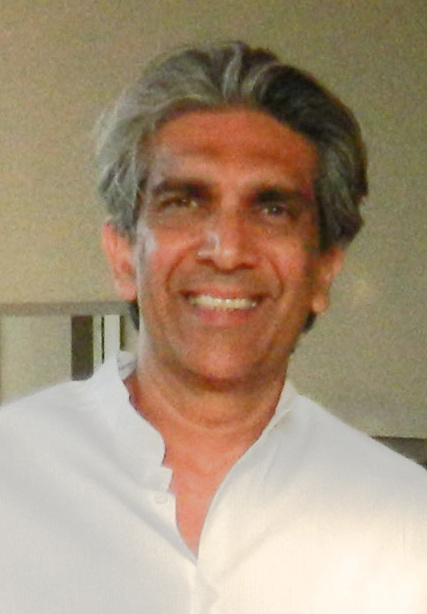
Bijoy Jain

- Prizewinner: Studio Mumbai
- Nominees: Alejandro Aravena, Atelier Bow-Wow, Nuno Brandão Costa, Angelo Bucci, Jan de Vylder, Inge Vinck und Jo Taillieu, Marcus Donaghy und William Dimond, Ecosistema Urbano, Liza Fior –MUF Architecture, Antón García-Abril, Anna Heringer, Zhang Ke, Zhang Lei, LTL ARCHITECTS, Gurjit Singh Matharoo, Alberto Mozó, Hiroshi Nakamura, Mauricio Pezo und Sofia von Ellrichshausen, Smiljan Radic, Camilo Rebelo, Enric Ruiz -Geli, José María Saez, Joaõ Pedro Serôdio und Isabel Furtado, Dominic Stevens, Studio Mumbai, Jonathan Woolf, Alejandro Zaera-Polo
- Beratungsgremium: Solano Benitez, Barry Bergdoll, Ole Bouman, Luis Fernández-Galiano, Kenneth Frampton, Sean Godsell, Kengo Kuma, Shelley McNamara, Rahul Mehrotra, Valerio Olgiati, Eduardo Souto de Moura, Wang Shu
- Jury: Mario Botta (chairman), Gonçalo Byrne, Marco Della Torre, Diebédo Francis Kéré, Mohsen Mostafavi, Nicola Navone (Secretary)

=== 2010 ===
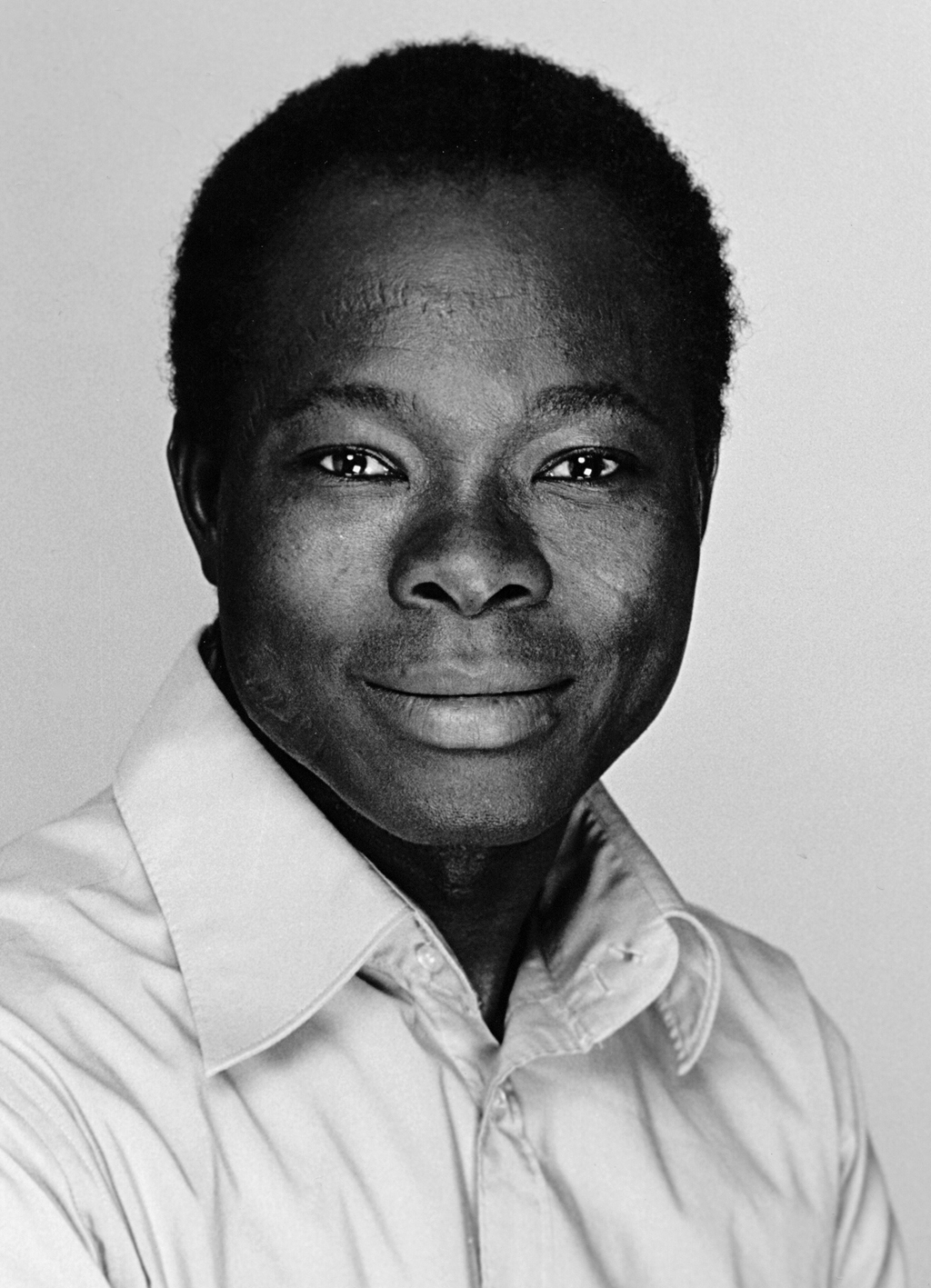
Diébédo Francis Kéré

- Prizewinner: Diébédo Francis Kéré
- Nominees: Iñaqui Carnicero, Ignacio Vila, Alejandro Virseda, Adam Caruso, Peter St. John, Davide Cristofani, Gabriele Lelli, João Pedro Falcão de Campos, Dietmar Feichtinger, Arturo Franco Diaz, Sosuke Fujimoto, José Fernando Gonçalves, Erich Hubmann, Andreas Vaß, Bjarke Ingels, Jun'ya Ishigami, Diebédo Francis Kéré, Christian Kerez, Andrea Liverani, Enrico Molteni, Fabio Mariani, Joao Mendes Ribeiro, MGM - José Morales, Sara de Giles Dubois, Juan G. Mariscal, Hiroshi Nakamura, nARCHITECTS - Eric Bunge, Mimi Hoang, Willem Jan Neutelings, Michiel Riedijk, Mauricio Pezo, Sofia von Ellrichshausen, Joshua Prinz Ramus, Bernhard Quirot, Jurij Sadar, Boštjan Vuga, Markus Scherer, José Selgas, Lucia Cano, URBANUS - Liu Xiaodu, Meng Yan, Wang Hui, Xu Tiantian - DnA Design und Architektur
- Advisory Board: Emilio Ambass, Laurent Beaudouin, Gonçalo Byrne, Alberto Campo Baeza, Massimo Carmassi, Kenneth Frampton, Dan S. Hanganu, Kengo Kuma, Boris Podrecca, Bruno Reichlin, Zhi Wenjun
- Jury: Mario Botta (chairman), Valentin Bearth, Solano Benitez, Barry Bergdoll, Luis Fernández-Galiano, Nicola Navone (Secretary)

=== 2008 ===
- Prizewinner: Solano Benitez
- Nominees: Solano Benitez, 3LHD Architekten, David Adjaye, Francisco und Manuel Aires Mateus, Jesus Aparicio, Gion A. Caminada, Alfonso Cendron, Dominique Coulon, Richard Francis Jones, Sean Godsel, Thomas Heidewick, Rick Freude, Albert Kalach, Francisco Mangado, Luis L. Mansilla, Emilio Tuñón Alvarez, Rahul Mehrotra, Miller & Maranta, Marco Navarra – NOWA, Büro dA - Monica Ponce de Leon, Nader Teherani, Valerio Olgiati, João Perloiro, João L. Ferreira, Paulo Perloiro, Paulo M. Barata, Pedro Appleton, Saša Randić, Idis Turato, João Alvaro Rocha, Enric Ruiz Geli - Wolke 9, SM.AO - Juan Carlos Sancho, Sol Madridejos, Beniamino Servino, Shuhei Endo, Das nächste UNTERNEHMEN, Antonio Jiménez Torrecillas, Wang Shu
- Beratungsgremium: Laurent Beaudouin, Gonçalo Byrne, Alberto Campo Baeza, Massimo Carmassi und Roberto Collovà, Kenneth Frampton, Dan S. Hanganu, Yung Ho Chang, Kengo Kuma, Paulo Mendes da Rocha, Boris Podrecca, Anant Raje, Bruno Reichlin
- Jury: Mario Botta (chairman), Emilio Ambasz, Valentin Bearth, Davide Croff, Zhi Wenjun, Nicola Navone (Secretary)
