= Xu Tiantian =

Chinese architect

- 徐甜甜
- Born: 1975 (age 50–51); Fujian, China

Xu Tiantian (Chinese: 徐甜甜) is a Chinese architect who is the founding principal architect of DnA Design and Architecture. She has engaged extensively in the rural revitalizing process in China. She has received numerous awards, such as the WA China Architecture Award in 2006 and 2008, the Moira Gemmill Prize for Emerging Architecture in 2019, and the 14th International Prize for Sustainable Architecture Gold Medal; in 2020, she was appointed an Honorary Fellow of American Institute of Architects. For Xu, architecture has the capacity to transform lives and to impact the society it serves while following the mandate of the times.

== Early life and education ==
Xu was born in 1975 in Fujian, China. She notes that her architectural interests likely were born out of her childhood home in Fujian – a large compound holding more than 100 people. The traditional home with layers of courtyards and corridors stands out in Xu's mind for its beauty.

Xu received her BArch from Beijing's Tsinghua University and her M.A. in urban design from the Harvard Graduate School of Design.

== Career and design approach ==
Growing up in China in the 1970s and 80s, Xu experienced the transformation of the urban landscape from traditional to modern. With China's Reform and Opening of the 1980s, the rural population of China's historically agrarian society began to pour into cities seeking new opportunities; the countryside was left with the elderly and children, unattended farmland, and run-down houses. Much of Xu's work represents a response to this transformation: she does not want to leave rural communities left behind. This focus on China's rural communities is evident in her interview for Many Voices: Architecture for Social Equity:

In China, rural people are still half of our population – as is true for most of the globe – so I have chosen to focus on rural communities. Many things are needed in rural areas to face this modern era, not just by modernisation but by approaching each rural context and history with sensitivity. The issues could be very different in different places – even our work changes very much from village to village. It's very important to respect the individuality of each project.

In calling for sensitive architectural interventions, Xu advocates for an approach known as "Architectural Acupuncture." This "Architectural Acupuncture" addresses holistically the social and economic revitalization of rural China by minimizing interventions, in order to promote long-term sustainable development of rural communities, without a dependence upon governmental or large-industry investments. She specifies:

What is a sensitive approach? It is acupuncture – to respect the issues and circumstances of the individual, and by extension, local agricultural production and architectural heritage. Acupuncture targets the specific points of the specific individual; it is neither random nor predetermined. You need to find out what the village is and what [interventions] it would be proud of – be it an agricultural factory, a heritage centre, a leisure/culture, or perhaps a bridge.

This approach has been described as a "multi-layered socio-economic healing process" producing prosperity that incentivizes life in rural regions.

=== Songyang ===
Xu's rural focus began with a commission for a hotel project on a tea plantation on a mountain in Songyang County, an agricultural county of some 400 villages located approximately 250 miles southeast of Shanghai. The work presented Xu's first substantial interaction with rural China. Songyang wanted to promote rural tourism and a form of nostalgia as part of an idea of national rejuvenation. At the time, Xi Jinping, the General Secretary of the Chinese Communist Party, had promoted "cultural self-confidence" and sought to develop rural areas in order to achieve a balance between the urban and rural.

Since 2016, Xu's work has continued to concentrate on Songyang. She has developed a series of thoughtful projects that promote the region's cultural heritage, such as a brown-sugar factory in the village of Xing (2016) that theatrically displays for visitors the artisanal process, and a memorial hall in Wang (2017), which tells the story of a legendary 14th-century scholar, Wang Jing, a native of the village. These projects not only have helped slow down the rural exodus from Songyang but also have attracted city dwellers, both tourists and new residents. These and other such "architectural acupunctures" are distributed across large parts of the county's territory in the form of relatively unassuming structures.

=== Songzhuang Art Center ===
Xu's examples of architectural acupuncture expand beyond Songyang and fully rural environments. On the edge of the East Sixth Ring Road in Beijing, the Songzhuang Art Center is the first public art facility within Songzhuang Art Colony, the largest art district in China. It provides a place where a growing number of artists who live in the neighbourhood are able to show their work and connect with other artists, as well as hold academic conferences. Completed in 2006, it was important to the architect that the structure take contextual clues from its surroundings. Xu describes the work in an essay titled, "Experimentation, Exchange, Life, and Art":

The red bricks used for the exterior of the museum and the grey paving tile in front of the museum that extend into the interior were references from the brick buildings and courtyards in the village. Reflecting traditional courtyards in the village, the individual art blocks of the museum were extruded from a rectangular envelope from a simple layout…The handrails of the staircase leading up to this classic space are made of a crisscross mesh of steel, evoking the fences in the existing village.

The architecture attempts to work within the spirit of the village, while also putting forth a neutral, minimal form in order to avoid "competition" with the artwork.

== Additional Works ==
- Huiming Tea Workshop, Jingniang County, 2019
- Rice Wine Factory, Songyang County, 2019
- Pine Pavilion, Songyang County, 2018
- Water Conservancy Centre, Songyang County, 2018
- Baitasi Hutong Gallery, Beijing, 2017
- Bamboo Pavilion, Songyang County, 2015

== Awards ==
Xu has received the WA China Architecture Award in 2006 and 2008, the Architectural League New York's Young Architects Award in 2008, the Design Vanguard Award in 2009 by Architecture Record, the Moira Gemmill Prize for Emerging Architecture in 2019, and the 14th International Prize for Sustainable Architecture Gold Medal.

She is an Honorary Fellow of the American Institute of Architects.

In 2022, she received the Swiss Architectural Award for three projects: the reuse of the Shimen Bridge over the Songyin River (2016–2017), the Tofu Factory in Caizhai Village (2017–2018), and the reuse of the Jinyun Quarries (2021–2022). She has taught design studio as a visiting professor at the Yale School of Architecture.

In 2025, Xu was awarded the Wolf Prize in Arts in the architecture category.
