= Gando, Burkina Faso =

Village in Boulgou Province, Burkina Faso

Coordinates: 11°50′30″N 0°29′13″W

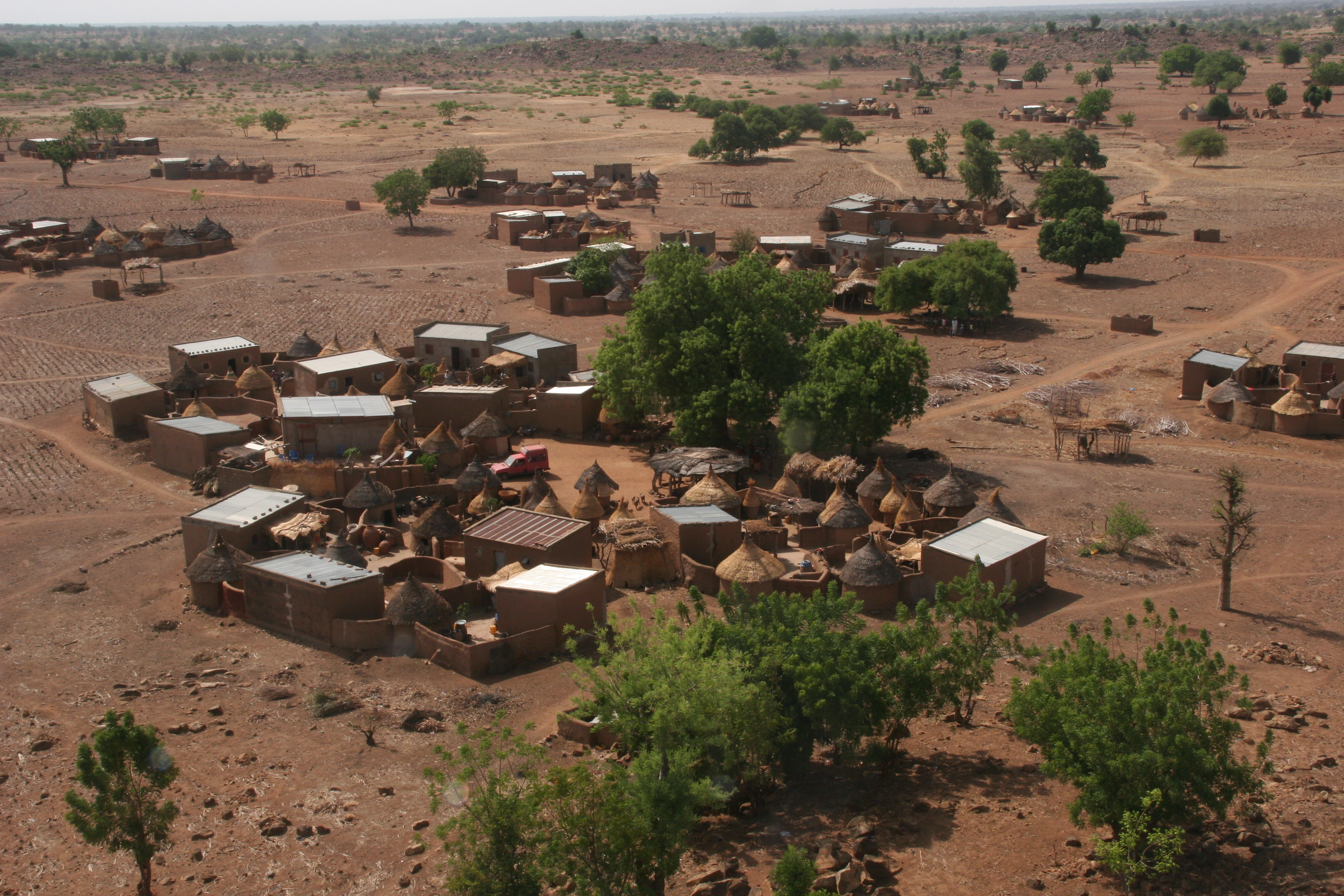
Gando village, 2000

Gando is a village in Burkina Faso, in the Centre-Est Region, the Boulgou province and the Department of Tenkodogo. Gando has about 2500 residents. The village became famous in 2004, when the architect Diébédo Francis Kéré, originating from Gando and living in Germany, received the prestigious Aga Khan Award for Architecture for the construction of the Gando primary school.

== Gallery ==
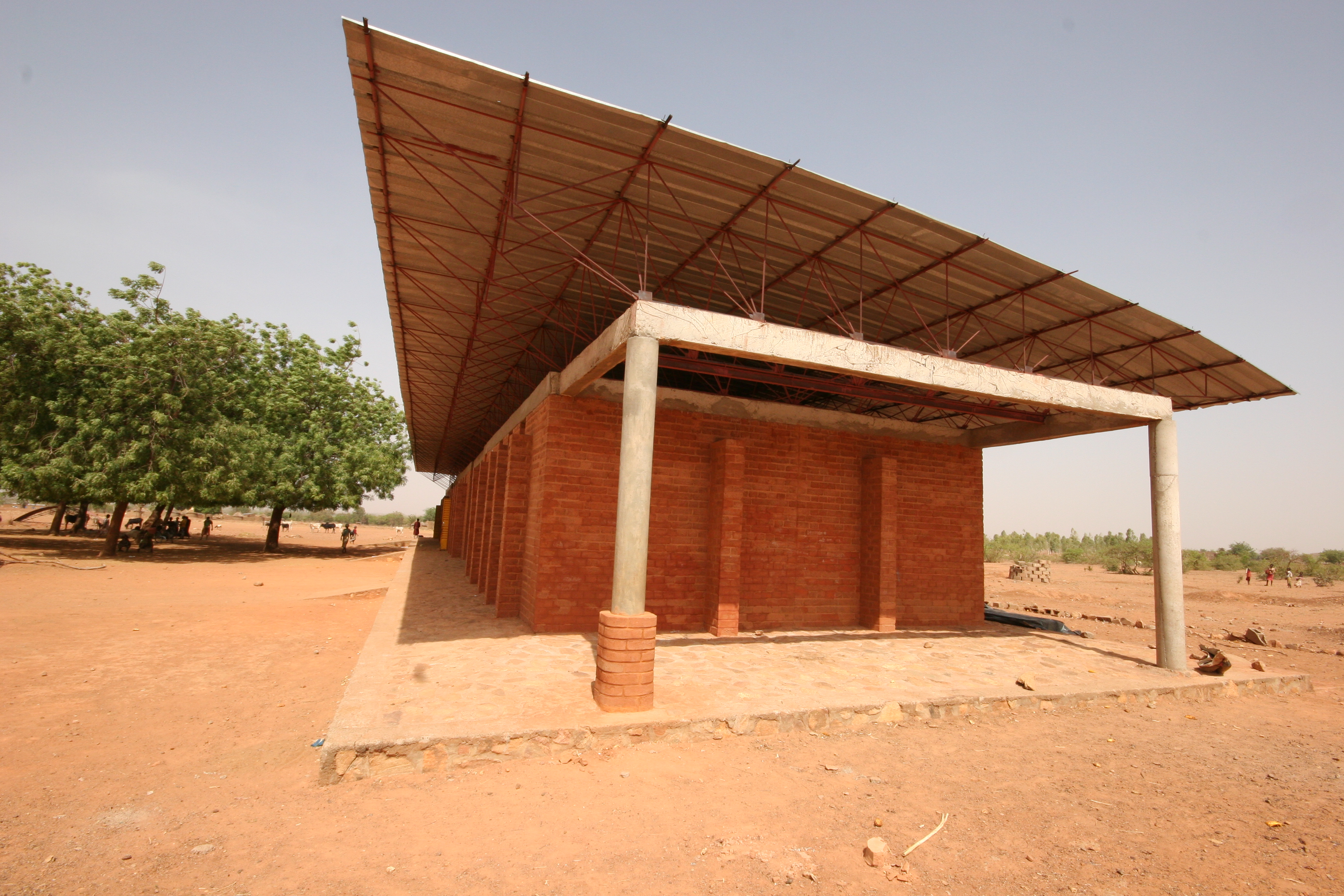
Primary School, Gando

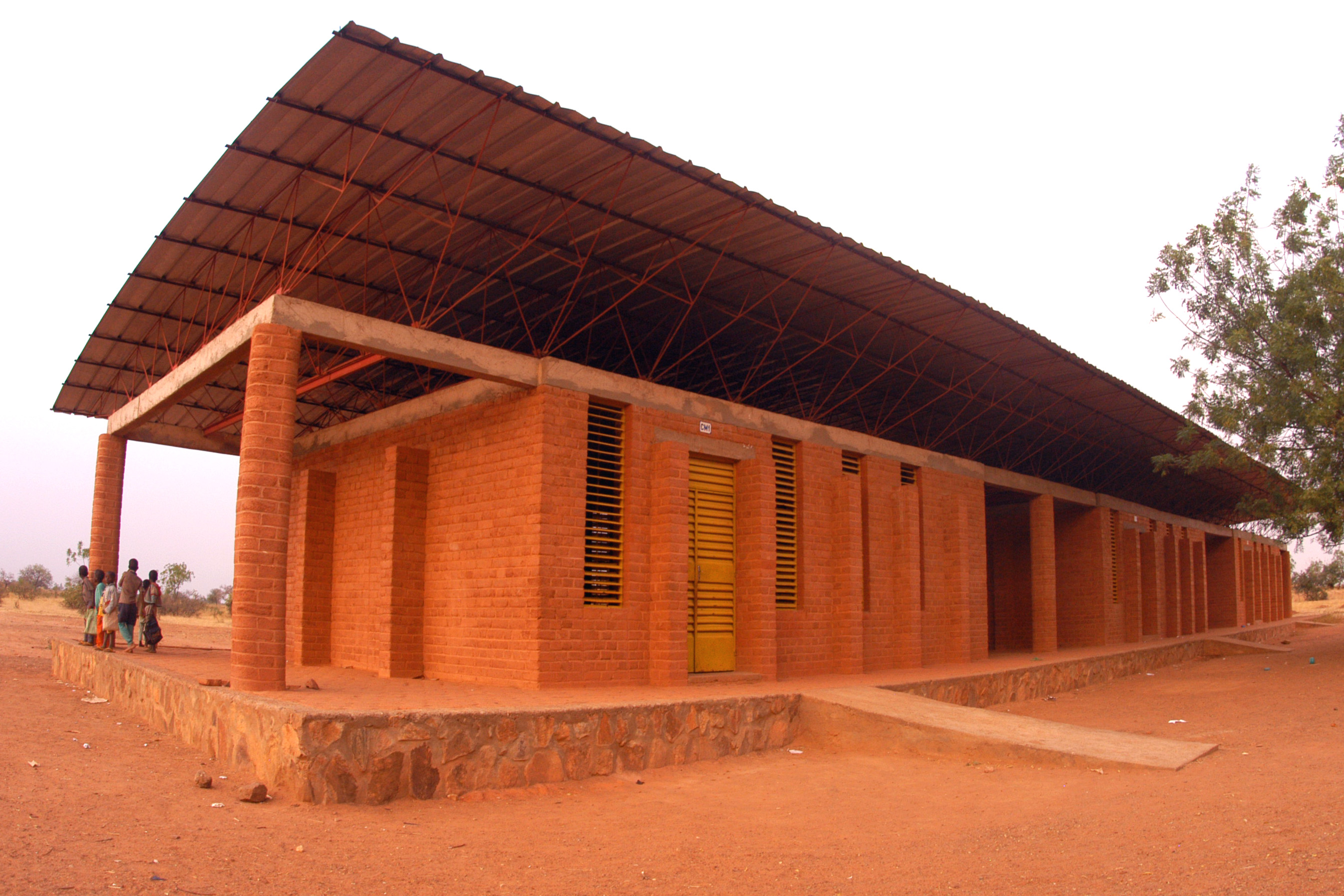
Gando primary school from Diébédo Francis Kéré.

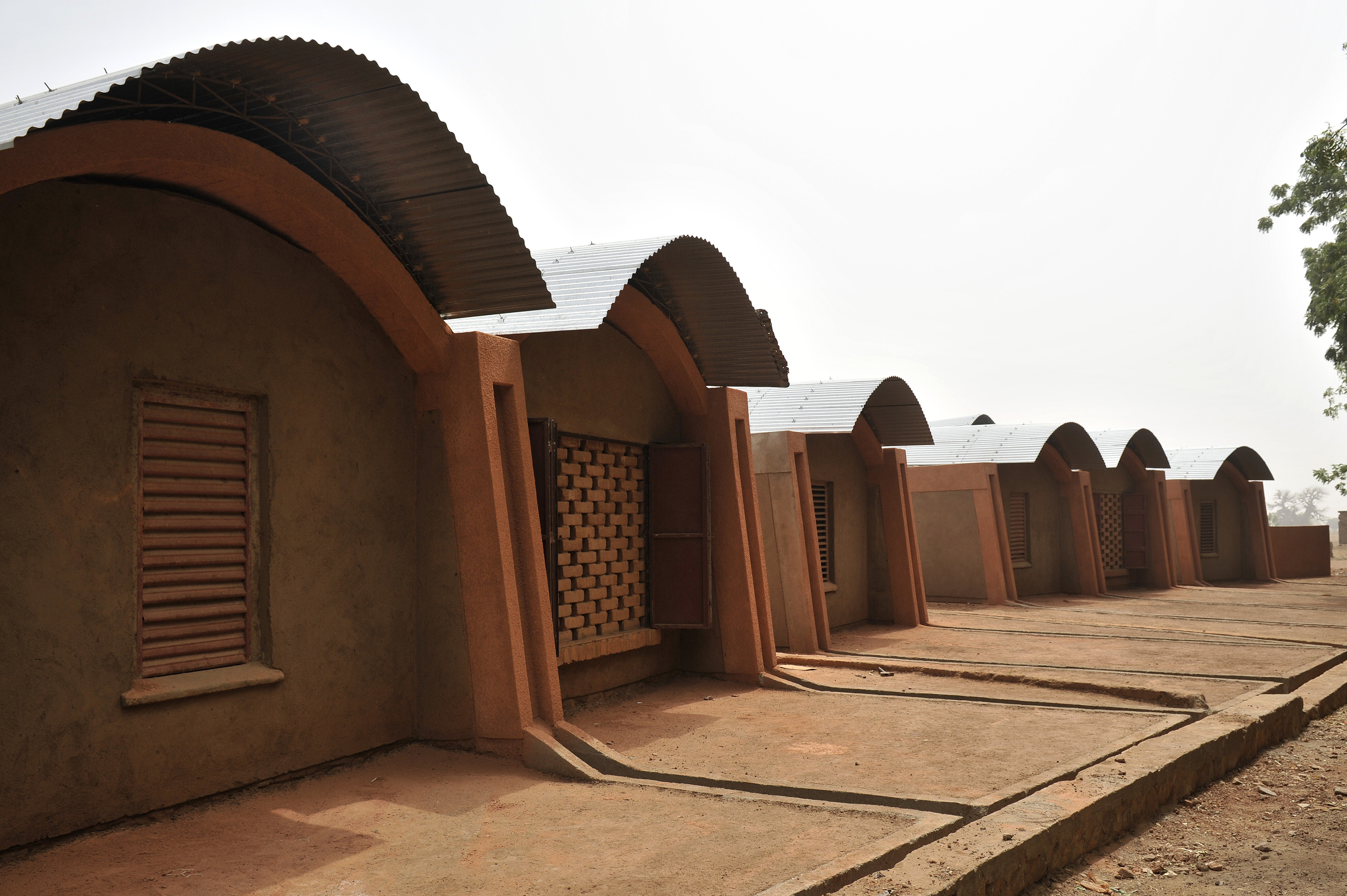
Gando teachers accommodation

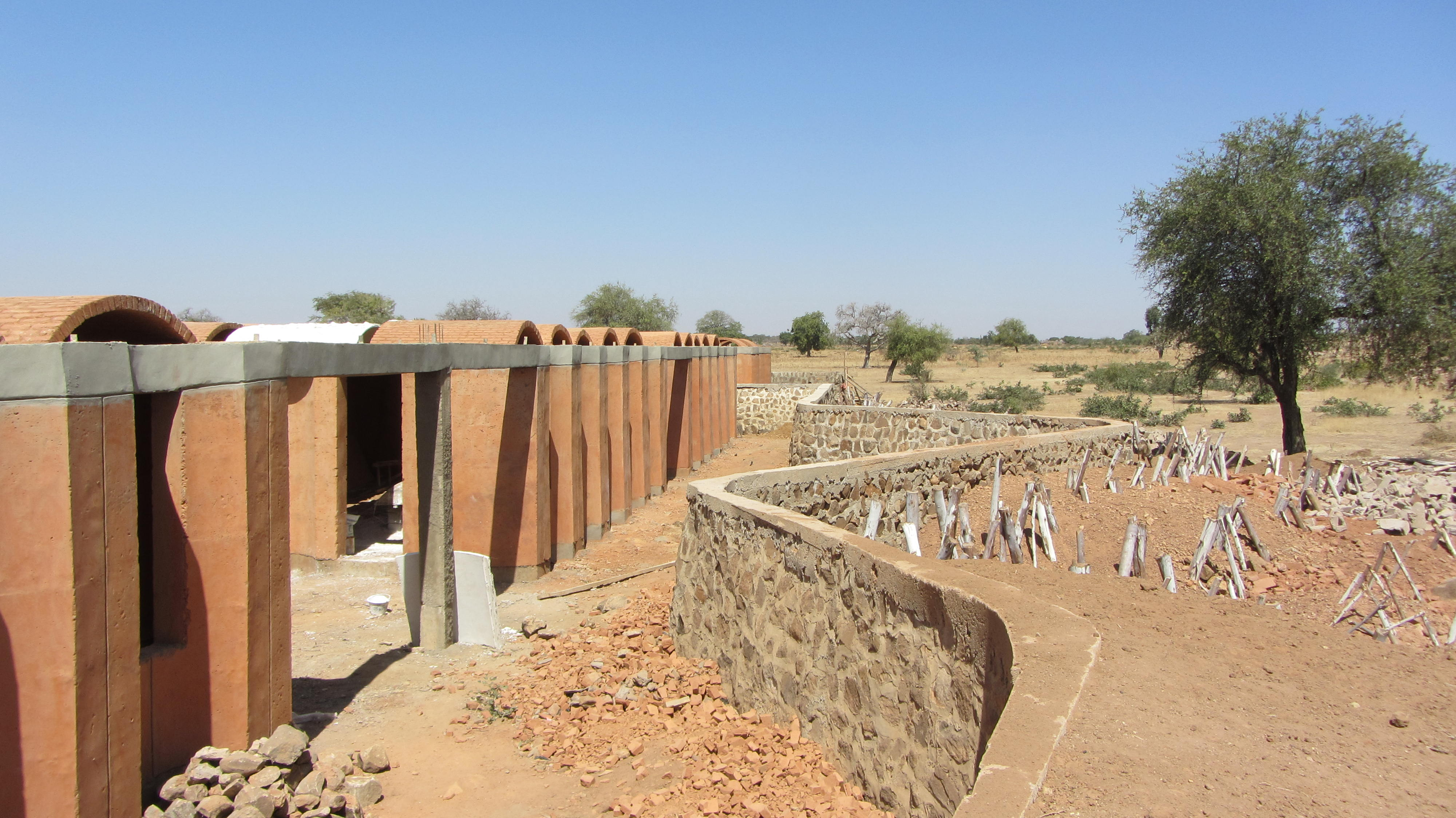
Gando secondary school detail

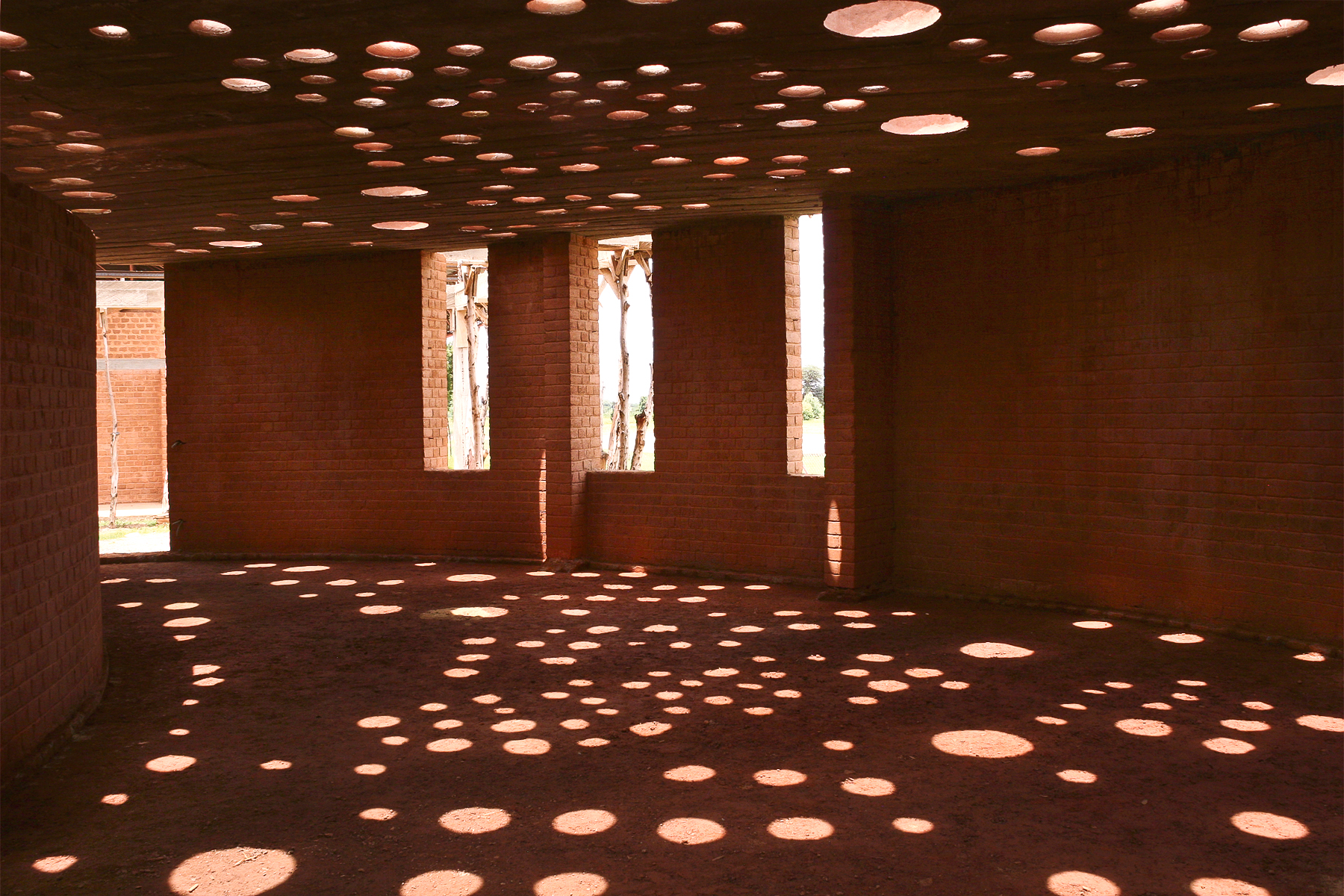
Detail of the primary school library

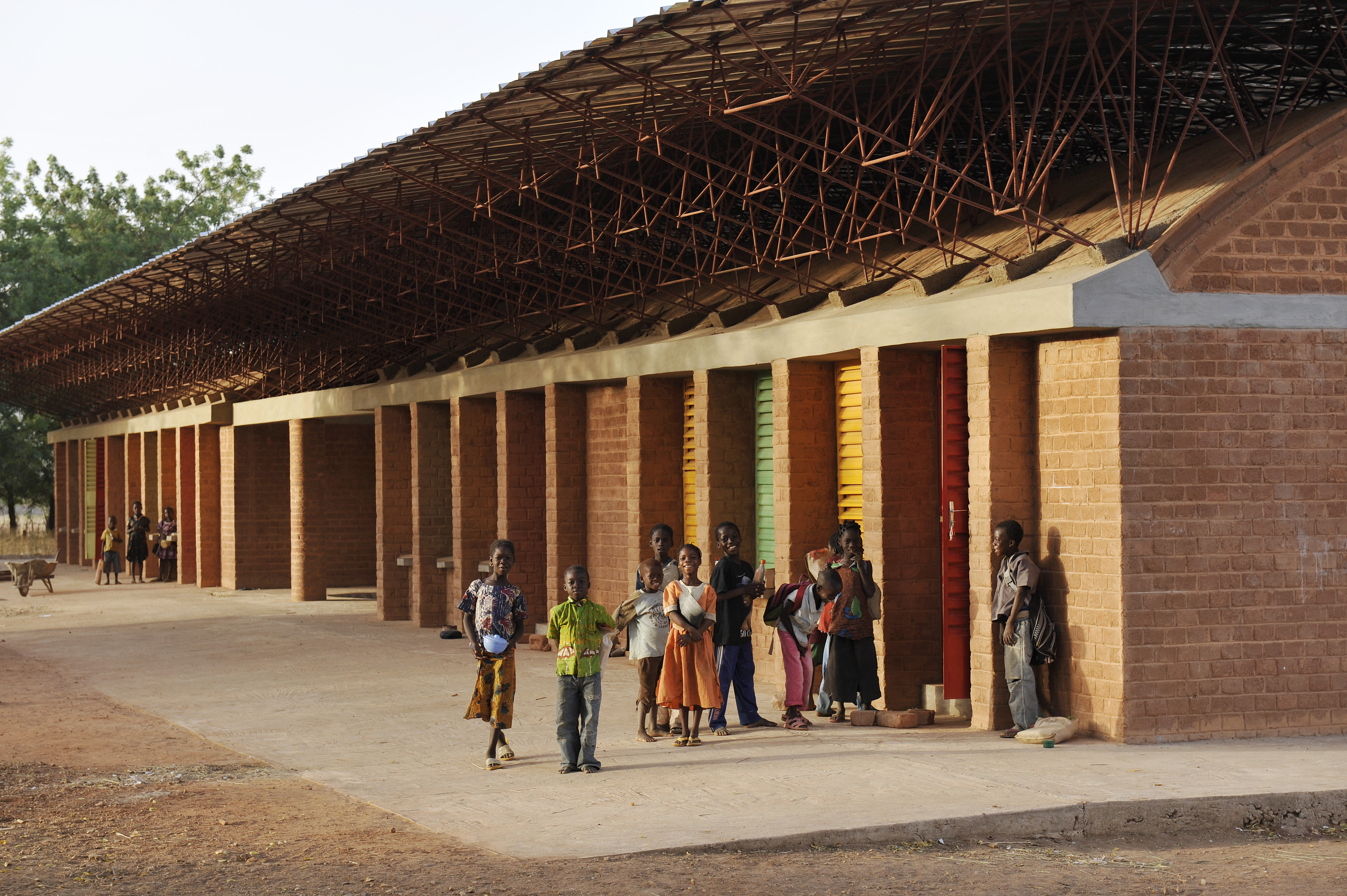
Primary school extension building
