= Diébédo Francis Kéré =

Burkinabé-German architect (born 1965)

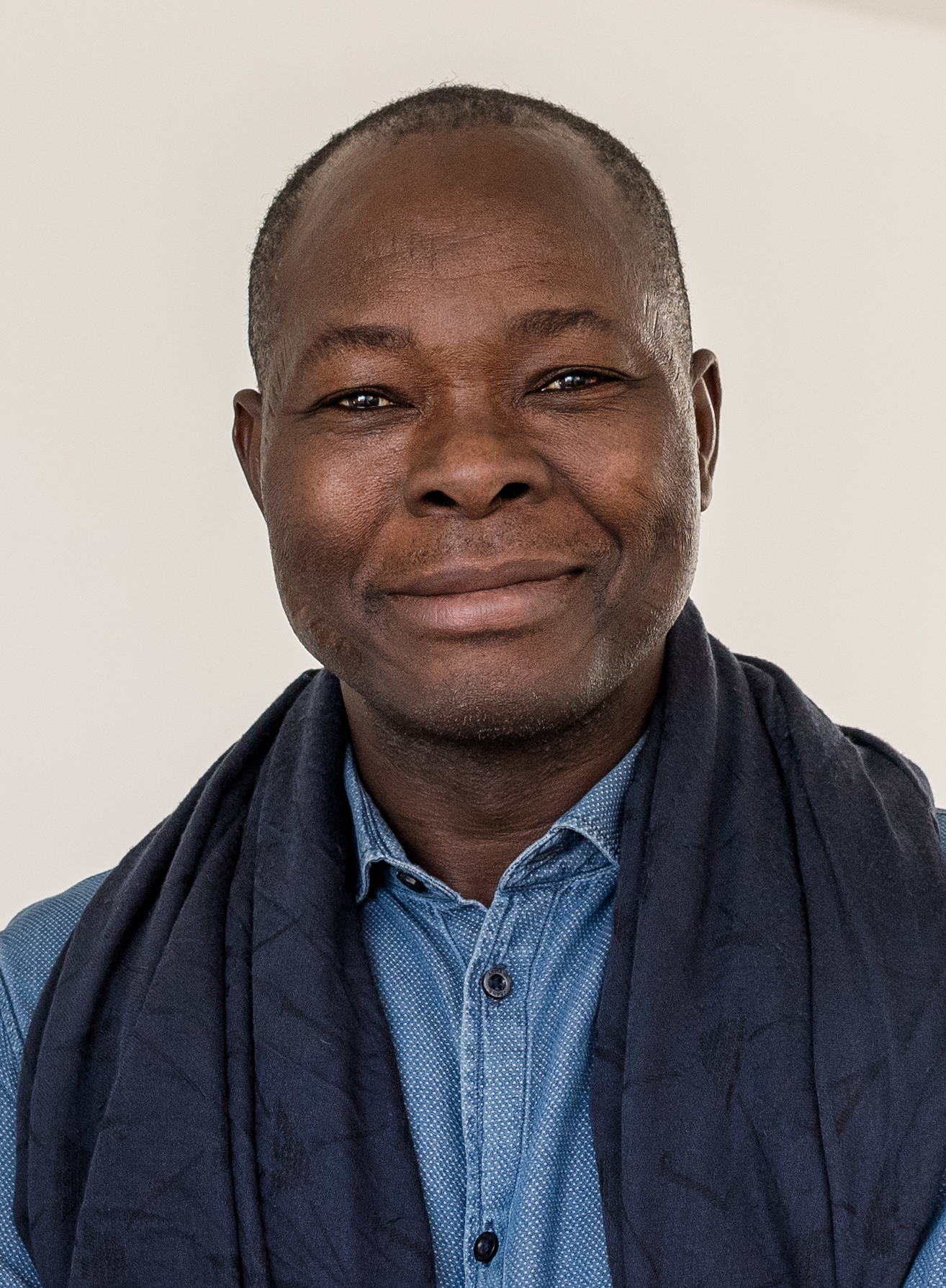
- Kéré in 2019
- Born: 10 April 1965 (age 61); Gando, Boulgou Province, Upper Volta (modern Burkina Faso)
- Education: Technische Universität Berlin
- Occupation: Architect
- Awards: Pritzker Architecture Prize; Aga Khan Award for Architecture; Global Award for Sustainable Architecture
- Practice: Kéré Architecture
- Buildings: Gando Primary School; Gando School Extension
- Projects: Gando Secondary School; Opera Village
- Website: www.kerearchitecture.com

Diébédo Francis Kéré (born 10 April 1965) is a Burkinabé-German architect, recognized for creating innovative works that are often sustainable and collaborative in nature. In 2022, he became the first native African to receive the Pritzker Architecture Prize. Educated at Technische Universität Berlin, he has lived in Berlin since 1985. Parallel to his studies, he established the Kéré Foundation (formerly Schulbausteine für Gando), and in 2005 he founded Kéré Architecture. His architectural practice has been recognized internationally with awards including the Aga Khan Award for Architecture (2004) for his first building, the Gando Primary School in Burkina Faso, and the Global Holcim Award for Sustainable Construction (2012 Gold).

Kéré has undertaken projects in various countries including Burkina Faso, Mali, Kenya, Uganda, Mozambique, Togo, Sudan, Germany, Italy, Switzerland, the US, and the UK. In 2017 the Serpentine Galleries commissioned him to design the Serpentine Pavilion in London. He has held professorships at the Harvard Graduate School of Design, Yale School of Architecture and the Swiss Accademia di Architettura di Mendrisio. In 2017 he accepted the professorship for "Architectural Design and Participation" at the Technical University of Munich, and a guest professorship at Bauhaus University, Weimar, in 2021.

== Early life and education ==
Kéré was born in the village of Gando, Burkina Faso. He was the first child in the village to be sent to school as his father, the village chief, wanted his eldest son to learn how to read and translate his letters. Since no school existed in Gando, Kéré had to leave his family when he was 7 years old to live with his uncle in the city. After finishing his education, he became a carpenter and received a scholarship from the Carl Duisberg Society to do an apprenticeship in Germany as a supervisor in development aid. After completing the apprenticeship, he went on to study architecture at Technische Universität Berlin, graduating in 2004.

During his studies he felt it was his duty to contribute to his family and to the community which had supported him, and to give the next generation the opportunity to follow in his footsteps. In 1998, with the help of his friends, Kéré set up the association Schulbausteine für Gando e.V. (now Kéré Foundation), which loosely translates as "Building Blocks for Gando", to fund the construction of a primary school for his village. His objective was to combine the knowledge he had gained in Europe, with traditional building methods from Burkina Faso. He completed his studies and built the first school in Gando as his diploma project in 2004, while also opening his own architectural office Kéré Architecture.

== Career ==
Kéré is known for involving community in his projects and for his innovative use of vernacular materials and techniques.

=== Teaching ===
Kéré has worked as a lecturer at Technische Universität Berlin. In spring 2011, he lectured at Virginia Tech, Washington University, and the University of Texas. The following summer he lectured at the University of Wisconsin in Milwaukee, and in autumn 2012 he was a visiting professor at Harvard. He also taught at the Accademia di Architettura di Mendrisio. Kéré accepted a newly created professorship for Architectural design and Participation at the Technical University of Munich in 2017. He was awarded a visiting professorship at the Yale School of Architecture. In 2021 Kéré took a position as guest professor at the Bauhaus University in Weimar, Germany.

=== Architecture and design projects in Gando ===
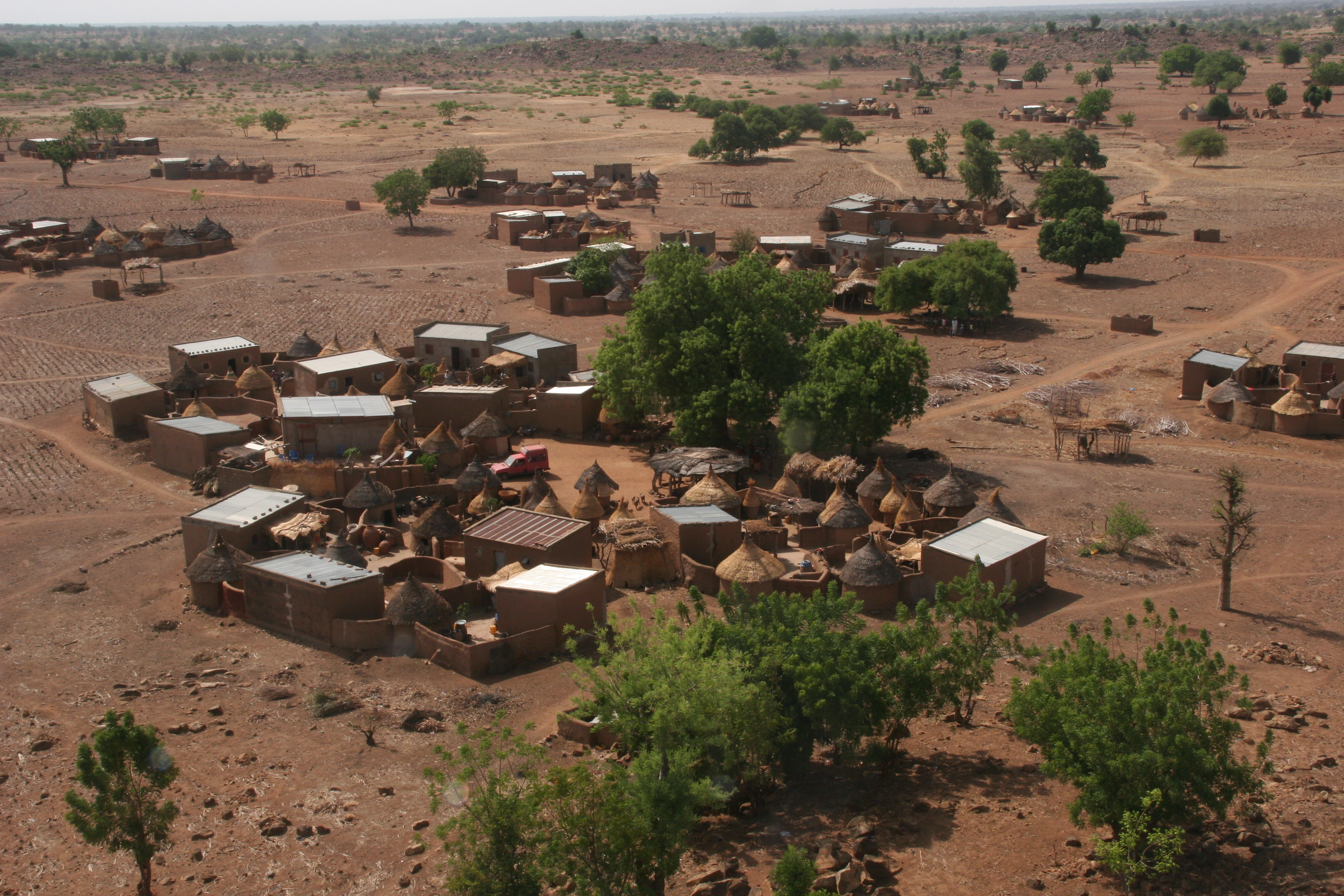
Gando, Burkina Faso

Kéré began working to design a school for his home village of Gando while he was enrolled at Technische Universität Berlin. The collaborative processes Kéré developed with Gando inhabitants and the innovative, local and ecological techniques and materials they created led Kéré to receive a Global Award for Sustainable Architecture in 2009.

Kéré's architecture was conceived of and built with the help of village inhabitants. The village, located at the south east of Ouagadougou, has approximately 3000 inhabitants who live in mud huts without access to running water or electricity. According to the UN Human Development Index in 2011, Burkina Faso is the 7th-least developed country in the world. Most residents are subsistence farmers, remaining dependent on the harsh climate which has restricted rainfall between October and June, and high daytime temperatures of 45 °C.

==== Gando Primary School ====
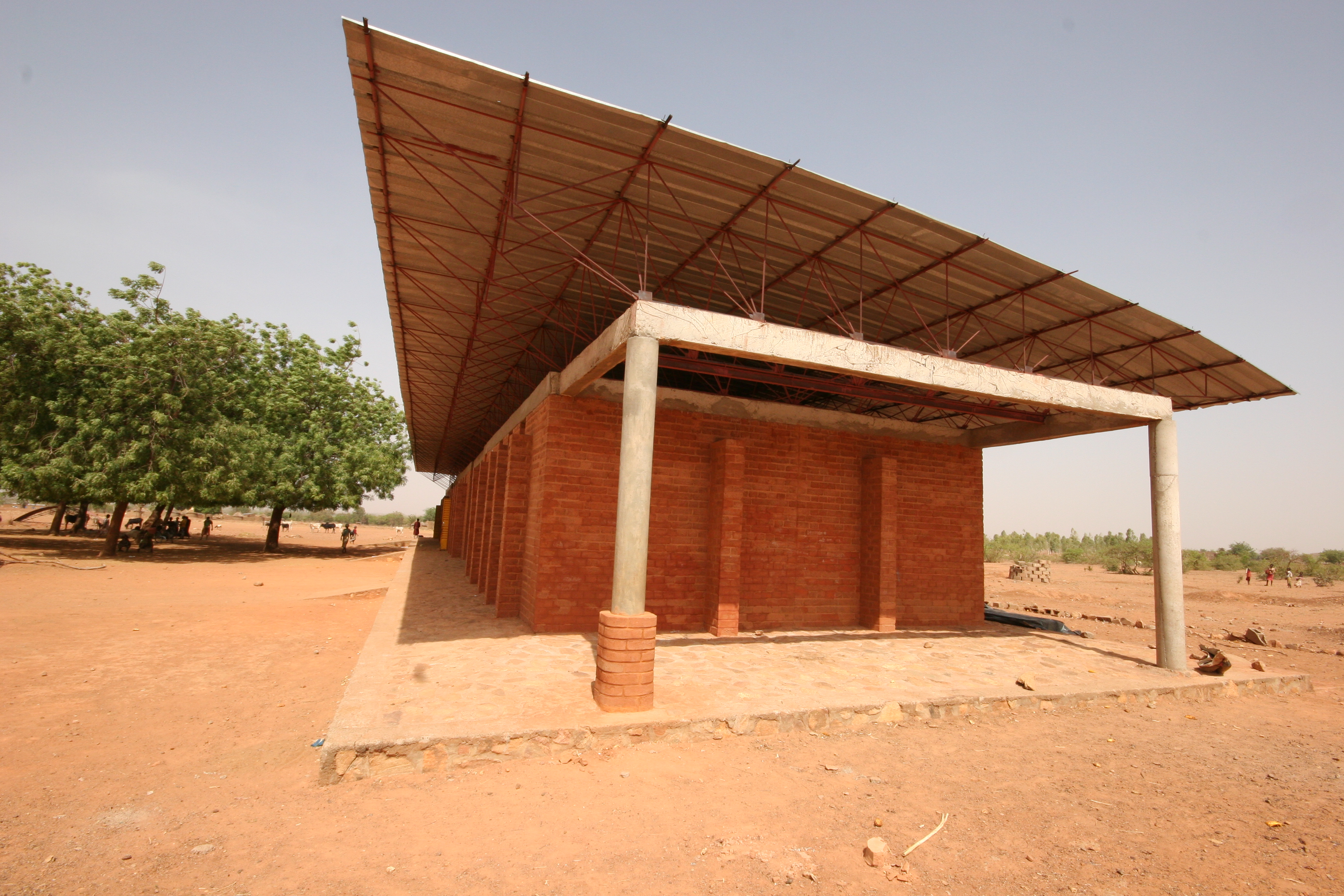
Primary school in Gando (2001)

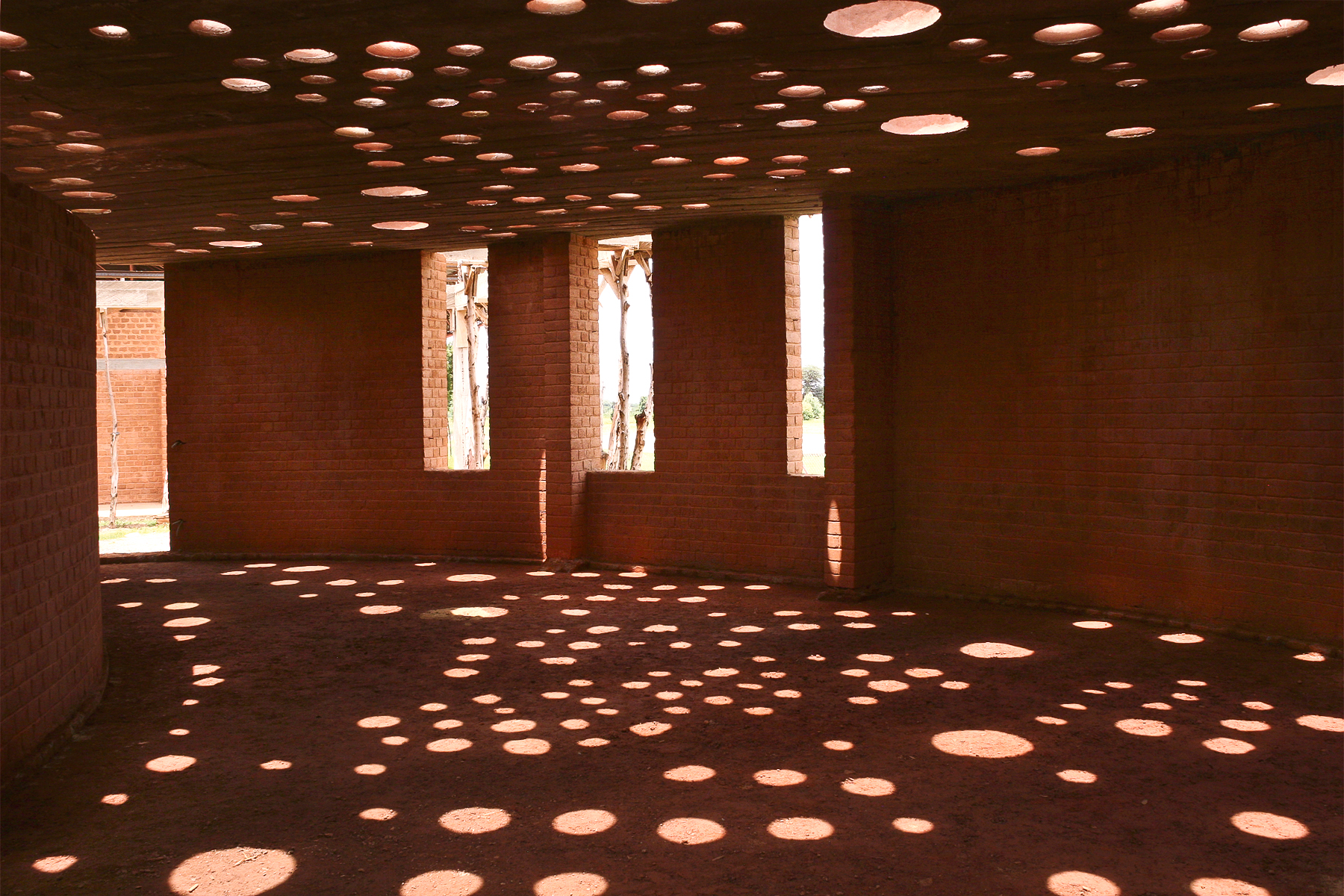
Public library (2012)

Kéré's primary school, the first for Gando, was completed in 2001. Schools in Burkina Faso are routinely built out of concrete, an expensive and energy consumptive material to produce, ill-suited to the local climate, as the interior becomes intolerably hot. Kéré wanted to use locally available resources and chose to build with earth in the form of mud bricks. Kéré's innovative design consisted of a wide, raised tin roof to protect the walls from rain, and allow air to circulate underneath for building cooling. The finished building was cooler and more pleasant inside than the conventional concrete school buildings. He won the Aga Khan Award for Architecture for the design in 2004.

Kéré drew preliminary building plans in the sand to communicate with villagers, many of whom were illiterate, and found they fully engaged with the project, with many generating their own suggestions for improvement. Kéré said, “Only those who are involved in the development process can appreciate the results achieved, develop them further, and protect them”. The entire population of Gando took part in the construction of the school. Village members received on-site training in construction techniques. Neighboring villages, impressed by Gando's community organization and achievement, set out to build their own schools.

A later addition to the primary school, completed by Kéré in 2012, contains a public library. As in the original building, locals took part in the construction, producing dozens of bottomless clay pots which are set into the roof to allow light into the library's reading room.

==== Gando Mango Tree Project ====
Kéré initiated a project of planting mango trees to better meet the communities' needs and address several major problems in the region including malnutrition. Kéré developed a strategy in which prior to planting the tree, a hole is filled with old bones and meat, and left for a few days. Over time, the bones and meat attract ants, which colonize the hole and eat the termites. This enables the trees to grow without needing any insecticide. For natural fertilizer, chickens are kept in the shade of the trees. Kéré then had residents place hand-made clay pots next to the trees, with drippers targeted directly to the roots, which gave the trees a small but constant supply of water. The clay pots prevent evaporation loss and only need to be filled once a week.

==== Gando Secondary School ====
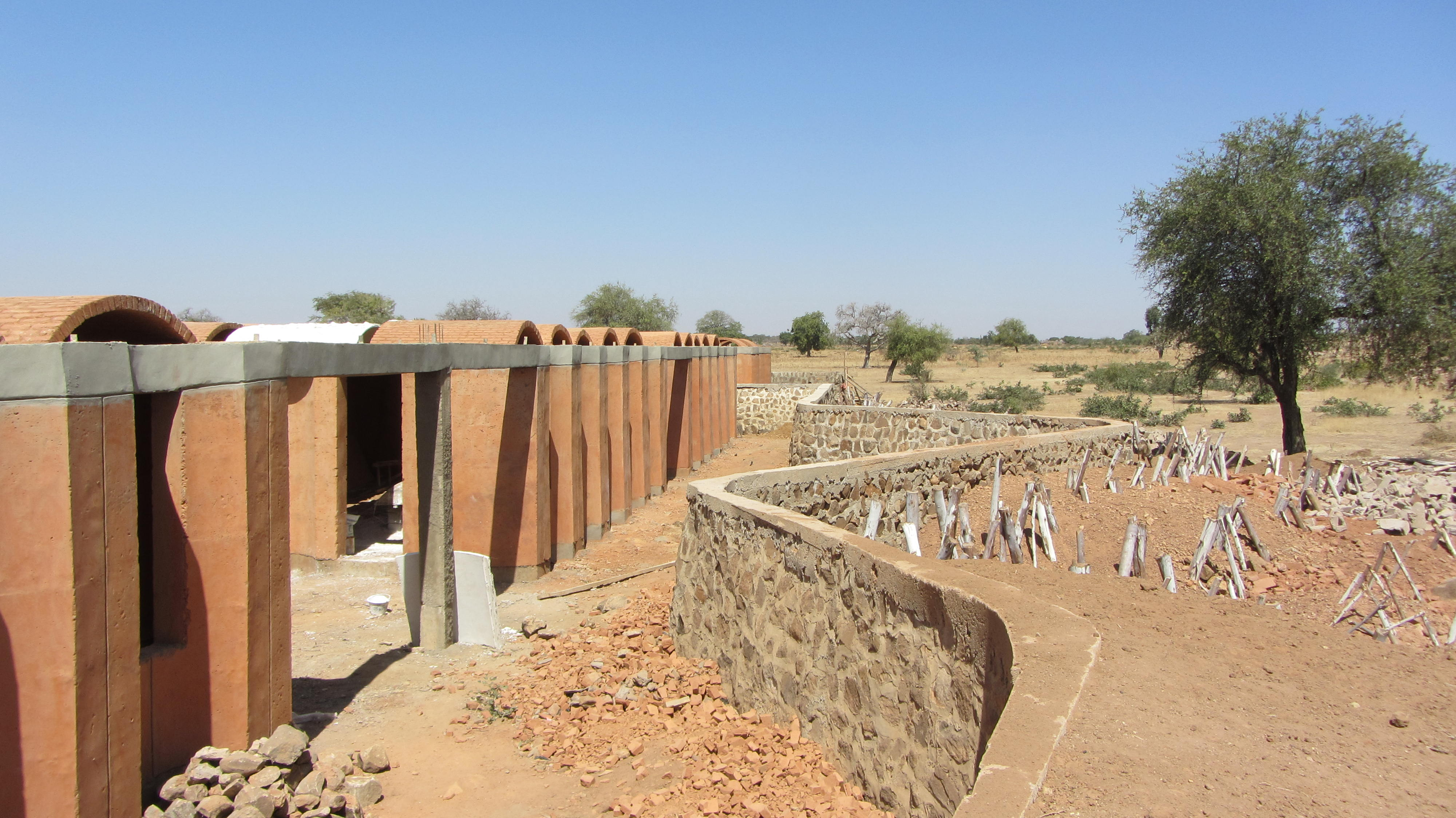
Secondary school in Gando

Construction of a secondary school designed by Kéré began in May 2011. The new building complex was designed to accommodate approximately 1000 students. The layout is inspired by the traditional rural households in Burkina Faso: the classrooms are set out in a circular fashion forming a protected courtyard, shielding it from the dust and sand brought by the Harmattan winds. The structure is open on its west side, allowing a cool breeze to enter the area, an innovative air-cooling system using only natural ventilation. The school is surrounded by a bank of earth, on which trees are planted. The trees provide shade, and rainwater is gathered to provide them with water. Perforated pipes are laid underneath the earth banks, and gather moisture. Wind cools down as it blows through the pipes, and emerges in the classrooms through holes in the floor, providing a zero emissions under-floor cooling system. This design won the 2012 Global Holcim Award for Sustainable Construction Gold.

The secondary school uses the same roof design as the primary school, with a wide corrugated iron roof raised above a clay ceiling. Air circulates between the ceiling and roof, heats up and rises, creating a suction current below. This causes the cool air from the under-floor pipes to rise, reducing room temperature by an estimated 6 – 8 °C. With simple yet effective methods such as these, the school requires little electricity both for construction and maintenance. In order to combat deforestation issues Burkina Faso faces, the secondary school used wood from eucalyptus trees for construction, and mango trees were planted in their place. The mango trees need less water, produce fruit and provide more shade than eucalyptus trees.

As with Kéré's other projects, the secondary school uses local manpower for construction. Specialists trained by Kéré supervise members of the local community, training them in the necessary building techniques. Rather than building the walls brick by brick, Kéré has devised a quicker way of pouring mud and a small quantity of cement into a mould.

==== Atelier Gando ====
Developed in 2014, the Atelier is a building which functions as a community center and on-site base for building projects. A group of students from the Accademia di Architettura di Mendrisio helped Kéré plan and build the first steps of the construction.

=== Other architecture and design projects ===
==== Dano Secondary School ====
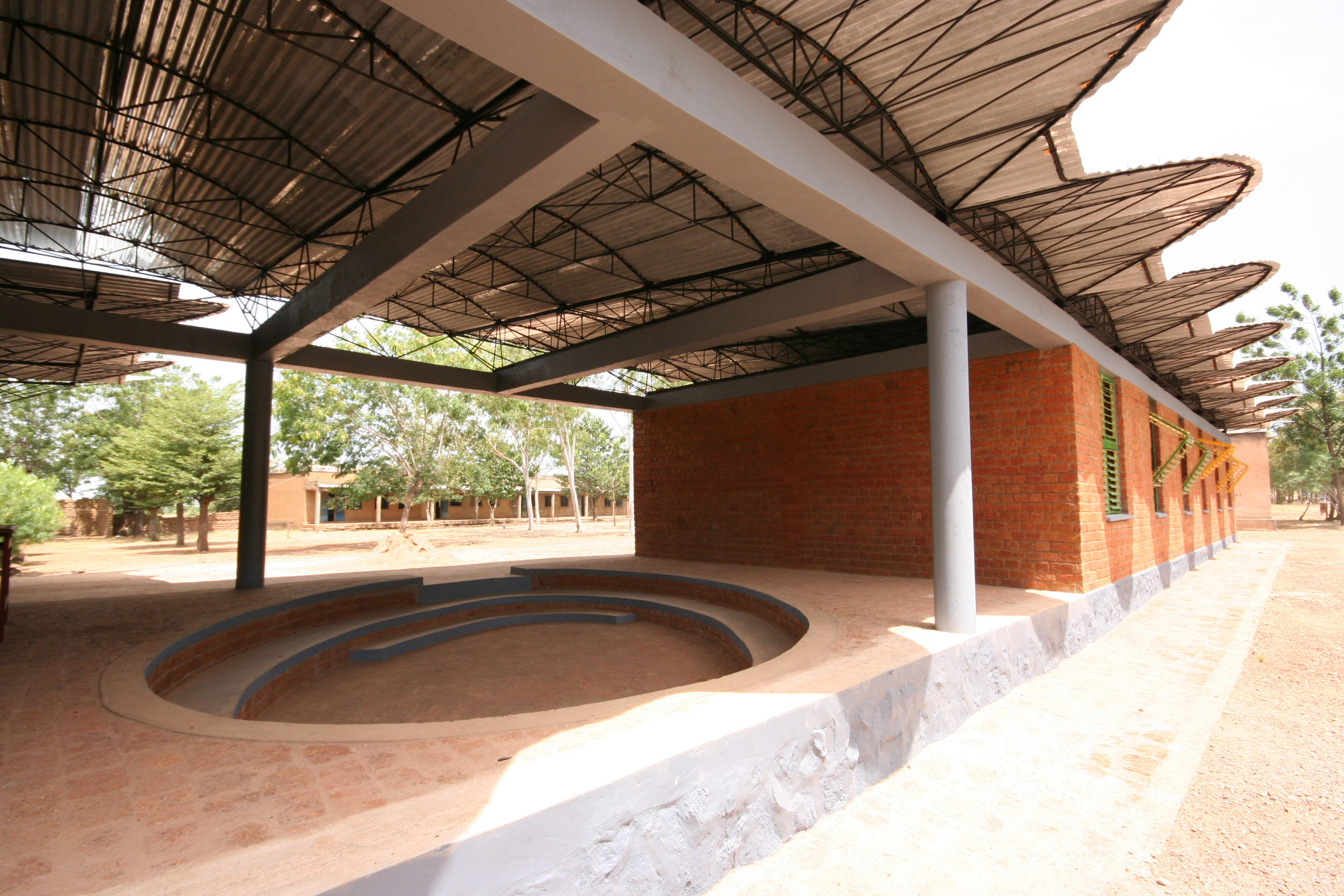
Secondary school in Dano, Burkina Faso

The secondary school project in Dano, Burkina Faso was inspired by Kéré's previous work in Gando. The excessive daytime heat was once again the major issue, but this time there were different local resources. Laterite stone, native to the region, was used as the main building material. The building was set at an east–west orientation which reduces direct solar radiation onto the walls, and the sharply protruding roof creates a lot of shade. The roof design with its system of natural ventilation allows the air to circulate between the mud brick ceiling and the raised tin roof. The building consists of three classrooms, a computer room and an office. There is also an amphitheatre designed for use during break times. Finished in 2007, the building work was largely done by people trained in the Gando school projects, giving them the opportunity to use and develop their skills, while also reducing construction costs.

==== Centre for Earth Architecture, Mopti ====
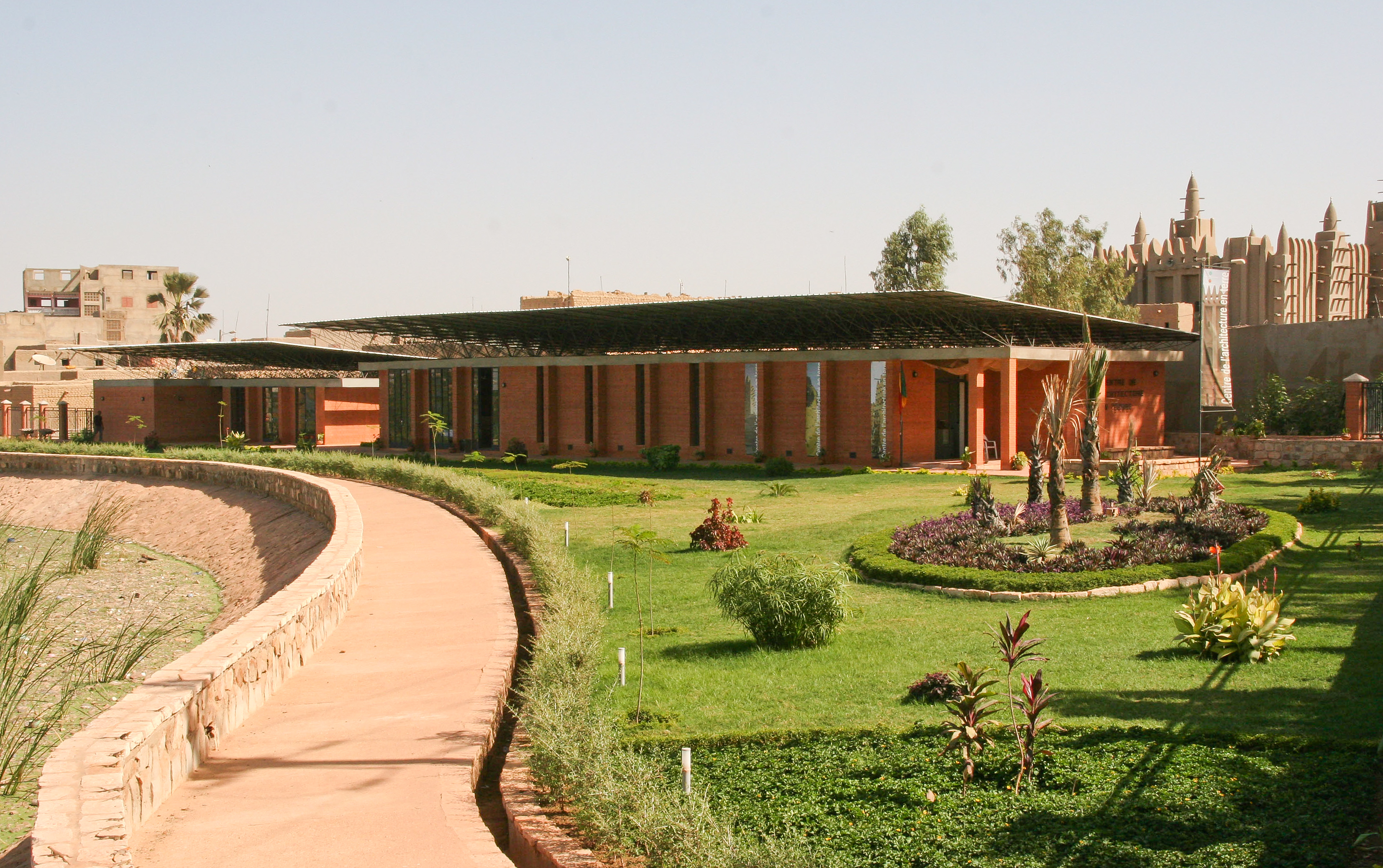
Centre for Earth Architecture in Mopti, Mali

The Aga Khan Trust for Culture has spent over 10 years renovating mosques in Northern Mali. Finished in 2010, the Centre for Earth Architecture in Mopti is part of this series of projects, following the restoration of the mosque and the construction of a new sewerage system. The centre is intended to be much more than an exhibition space: the building is the product of the same ancient building techniques used in the Great Mosques in Mopti, Timbuktu and Djenné. It demonstrates how a material that is a part of the area's heritage can be used in a modern context. The centre is made up of an exhibition hall, a community centre, public toilets and a restaurant, responding to the needs of the district management of Komoguel and visitors to the area, as well as the local community.

From the top of the flood barrier, it can be seen that the building is aligned with the mosque. The building has a simple structure and its height corresponds to the neighbouring buildings without compromising the view of the mosque. When viewed from across the lake the centre manages to maintain a connection with the mosque but does not dominate the view.

The centre is divided into three different buildings which are connected by two roof surfaces. Clay for the building was brought from 5 km away, so that the red colour would contrast with the colour of the local buildings, which are all made using traditional mud construction. The rusty red colour of the laterite clay is due to its high iron oxide content. All the walls and barrel vaults in the centre are made out of BTC (compressed earth blocks) and are not plastered or painted. These are very well suited to the climatic conditions as they create a natural temperature buffer, making indoor temperatures much more comfortable. The overhanging roof blocks keep the walls cool and provide shaded outdoor spaces. The building is naturally ventilated through openings in the walls and vaults, therefore, mechanical air conditioning is not needed. Most vernacular buildings in Mopti have wooden ceilings filled with clay. Kéré used a new system in this building that involves no wood – BTC vaults. He wants to promote the use of clay but to be sparing in his use of wood, as deforestation is a huge environmental issue in Mali.

==== Opera Village ====
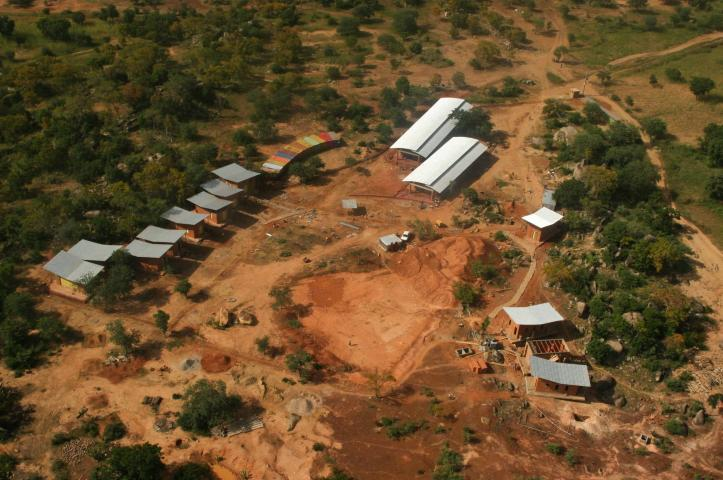
Construction of the Remdoogo Opera Village in Laongo, Burkina Faso

The Opera House for Africa project was initiated by German film and theatre director Christoph Schlingensief. Schlingensief brought Kéré on board to develop a housing prototype for people affected by flooding. The Remdoogo opera village was constructed on a 12-hectare site on a small rise in Laongo, one hour's drive from Ouagadougou and overlooking the West African landscape of the Sahel. A festival theatre, workshops, medical centre and guest houses were designed, as well as solar panels, a well, and a school for up to 500 children and teenagers with music and film classes. The stage and auditorium were designed and constructed in Germany and later transferred to the opera village. Kéré used Burkinabe fabrics to cover seat rows and interior walls.

Simple basic modules, which vary in quality and function depending on the equipment they house, comprise the entire village. Local people were employed to build the modules, and local materials such as clay, laterite, cement bricks, gum wood and loam rendering were used for construction. For reinforcing elements such as beams, columns, ring beams, and foundations, concrete was used. Due to the massive walls and large overhang of the roofs, air conditioning could be discounted in most buildings. The theatre hall was conceived as a place of encounter and exchange for people of different cultural and family backgrounds.

==== Zhoushan Harbour Development, China ====
The archipelago of Zhoushan in China is the site of an experimental urban rehabilitation project, led by the architect Wang Shu. Zhoushan is the Chinese capital of fishing, as it is situated at the entrance of the delta of the Yangtze River, and has a population of around one million. The aim of this project, started in 2009, was to transform the industrial harbour area, Putuo, into a touristic and cultural district. The architecture was designed to maintain a dialogue between modernity and the area's history and heritage. Sited on an island about 300 metres from the mainland, the chosen plot of land contains a dense assortment of buildings, docks and warehouses, built over several decades.

Kéré designed an exhibition gallery, an information centre, artists’ studios and a “cultural creativity garden” for the area. The scheme is designed around a platform that extends across the site all the way to the mountain, which borders the site to the west. This will serve as a space of transition between the man-made environment of the developed district and the natural environment beyond.

The best possible level of transparency is achieved by means of floor-to-ceiling glass elements. Sunlight gets into the rooms and there are unlimited views over the entire site. The southern and eastern facades are particularly exposed to the sun in summertime. Bamboo poles serve as exterior shades characterised by their natural irregular structure. Wood panels alternate with glass elements, thus the needs for both transparency and solar protection are met.

==== Medical Centre, Léo ====
In 2012, Kéré Architecture embarked on a new project to build a medical centre in Léo. Léo is a town in Sicily Province in Burkina Faso situated near the border with Ghana, around 150 kilometres south of the capital city, Ouagadougou. The population of Léo is 50,000, but the medical centre will also serve the villages in the surrounding countryside. A high staff turnover rate and lack of smaller, local clinics mean that the district hospital is often overstretched and struggles to serve the whole community. The charity “Operieren in Afrika” decided to raise funds to build a medical clinic in Léo for small, simple operations. They will provide scholarships to trained doctors and nurses to staff the clinic, which will maintain a connection with Germany.

As the project had limited funding, Kéré Architecture used pre-planned modules as the basis for the project. As in the Gando secondary school, the walls were constructed from cast earth and the roofs from the tin. The modules are arranged so that their roofs overlap, in order to provide more shade. In the final phase of the design, the space between the modules has become interior space. The “corridor” of space between the rows of modules is a wide, open circulation space, with benches for people to relax on and trees for shade.

==== International Red Cross and Red Crescent Museum, Geneva ====
Kéré at the 2024 World Economic Forum

Kéré was one of three architects chosen to design a permanent exhibition space at the International Red Cross and Red Crescent Museum, which opened in 2012 in Geneva, Switzerland. Each architect worked on a theme; Gringo Cardia (from Brazil) focused on “defending human dignity”, Shigeru Ban (from Japan) focused on “refusing fatality” and Kéré selected the theme “reconstructing the family link”.

Kéré contributed the dark entrance passage, bounded by hemp concrete walls, that encourages the visitor to consider the frightened and suffocating emotions of family tragedy during conflict. Central to this part of the exhibition is a tower, also made of hemp concrete, which is an architectural reference to a traditional hut for a nuclear family. It lets in very little light and has a Corten steel floor with a rusty appearance. This space is a memorial to tragedies such as the Srebrenica massacre. A Tree of Messages, with metal branches, was built to serve as a reminder of the cold contrast between nature and war. The connection between nature and the family is an important sub-theme in Kéré's part of the exhibition. The Room of Witnesses is a direct contrast to the tower as here the focus is on transparency and hope rather than darkness and despair. This space emphasizes the important role eyewitness testimony plays in humanitarian action.

== Other work ==
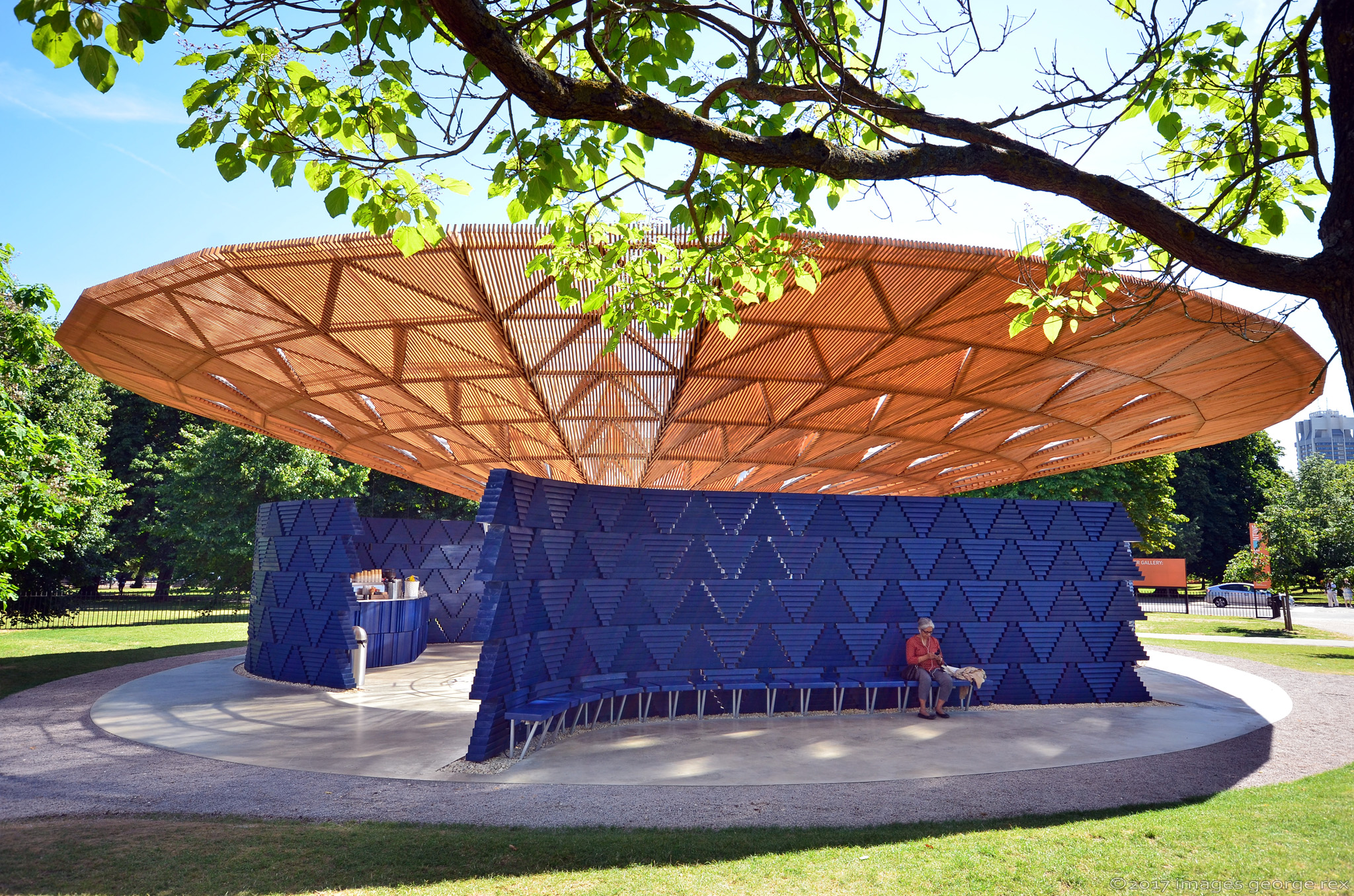
Serpentine Gallery Pavilion (2017) in London, the United Kingdom

Kéré has lectured and provided conceptual designs for projects in countries all over the world. His ideas were presented in the German Architecture Museum in Frankfurt and the Expo 2008. In Yemen he designed school building prototypes to fit the different climate regions of that country. Kéré designed a school and community centre for the village of Pouni in Burkina Faso.

From October 2010 until January 2011 models and photos of Kéré's projects were featured at an exhibition entitled ‘Small Scale, Big Change: New Architectures of Social Engagement', at the Museum of Modern Art in New York City. In June 2010, Kéré took part at the International Congress of Architecture and Society in Pamplona, entitled ‘Architecture: more for less'.

In 2014 Kéré participated to the exhibition Sensing Spaces at the Royal Academy of Arts. In 2016, his work was included in Alejandro Aravena's Venice Architecture Biennial, centered on low-tech construction techniques, traditional materials, and local knowledge. From November 2016 to March 2017 Kéré presented his first monographic exhibition "Francis Kéré. Radically Simple" in Munich at Architekturmuseum der TUM. In 2017, the Serpentine Galleries commissioned Kéré to design the Serpentine Pavilion in London.

Kéré designed Sarbalé ke, a vibrant installation consisting of 12 towers, for the art program of the 2019 Coachella Valley Music and Arts Festival.

In 2024, Kéré’s design proposal for the Las Vegas Museum of Art was granted approval. Construction is planned to begin before 2027, with projected completion in 2028.

== Prizes ==
- Aga Khan Award for Architecture (2004)
- Global Award for Sustainable Architecture (2009)
- Swiss Architectural Award (2010)
- Marcus prize for architecture (2011)
- Holcim Awards Gold 2011 Africa Middle East
- Global Holcim Awards 2012 Gold
- Schelling Architecture Award (2014)
- Kenneth Hudson Award for European Museum of the Year (2015)
- American Academy of Arts & Letters Arnold W. Brunner Memorial Prize (2017)
- Prince Claus Laureate Award (2017)
- Thomas Jefferson Medal in Architecture (2021)
- Pritzker Architecture Prize (2022)
- Praemium Imperiale(2023)
- Crystal Award from the World Economic Forum (2024)

== See also ==
- Laurie Baker
- Architecture for Humanity
- Anna Heringer
