= Patuakhali (disambiguation) =

Patuakhali is a city in Bangladesh. It may also refer to:

== Places ==
- Patuakhali District , district of Bangladesh in Barisal Division
- Patuakhali Sadar Upazila, Upazila in Barisal, Bangladesh

== Organizations ==
- Patuakhali Airport, naval air Base in Patuakhali, Bangladesh

== Institutions ==
- Patuakhali Science and Technology University, public university specified for Science and technology in Patuakhali, Bangladesh
- Patuakhali Medical College, government medical college in Patuakhali, Bangladesh
- Patuakhali Government College, educational institution in Patuakhali District
- Patuakhali Government Women's College, Bangladesh educational institution
- Patuakhali Government Jubilee High School, government funded secondary school in Bangladesh
- Patuakhali Government Girls' High School, government school in Patuakhali District

== Other uses ==
- Patuakhali Stadium, multi-purpose stadium located at Patuakhali, Bangladesh
- CGS Patuakhali, a Pabna-class riverine patrol craft of the Bangladesh Coast Guard
