= Lohalia Bridge =

- Coordinates: 22.347188°N 90.358101°E
- Carries: Vehicle
- Crosses: Lohalia River
- Locale: Patuakhali Sadar, Patuakhali
- Maintained by: Roads and Highways Department, Patuakhali

Characteristics
- Total length: 576.25 metres (1,890.6 ft)
- Width: 7.32 metres (24.0 ft)
- No. of spans: 14

Rail characteristics
- No. of tracks: 2

History
- Construction start: November 9, 2011; 14 years ago
- Construction end: June 30, 2023; 2 years ago
- Construction cost: 1.01 billion Bangladeshi Taka
- Opened: November 14, 2023; 2 years ago

Location
- Interactive map of Lohalia Bridge

Lohalia Bridge is a road bridge constructed over the Lohalia River, located on the eastern side of Patuakhali town in Bangladesh. The total length of the bridge is 575.25 metres (1,887.3 ft). Construction of the bridge began in 2011 and was completed in 2023.

== History ==
In 2008, the Local Government Division (LGD) initiated the construction of this bridge over the Lohalia River on the Galachipa–Kalgachhia road in Patuakhali. At that time, the estimated construction cost was 460 million Bangladeshi Taka. The work order for the bridge was issued on 9 November 2011, and construction began. At the outset, 4.951 acres (20,040 m^{2}) of land was acquired for the project, costing 37.52 million Bangladeshi Taka.

The bridge was initially scheduled to be completed in 2014. However, after completing 55% of the construction, work was halted on 1 October 2014 following an inter-ministerial meeting between the Local Government Division, the Rural Development and Co-operatives Division, and the Ministry of Shipping. Initially, the clearance height of the bridge from the river was 9.57 metres (31.4 ft). During project approval, the planned Port of Payra was not considered. With the future operation of cargo ships on the Lohalia River due to Payra Port, the bridge's low clearance became a concern, leading to the suspension of construction.

Later, considering the requirements Port of Payra, the bridge's clearance was increased to 13.5 metres (44 ft) above the river. Construction resumed in August 2019. The work was originally scheduled for completion in December 2020, but the COVID-19 pandemic caused delays and extensions.

On 30 June 2023, the Local Government Engineering Department completed the bridge construction. Former Prime Minister Sheikh Hasina inaugurated the bridge on 10 November 2023 via video conference from Ganabhaban.
