= Auliapur =

- Location in Bangladesh
- Coordinates: 22°41′N 90°29′E
- Country: Bangladesh
- Division: Barisal Division
- District: Patuakhali District
- Time zone: UTC+6 (Bangladesh Time)

Auliapur is a village in Patuakhali Sadar Upazila of Patuakhali District of southern-central Bangladesh.
