= Vocational school =

Higher-level learning institution providing education needed for specific occupations

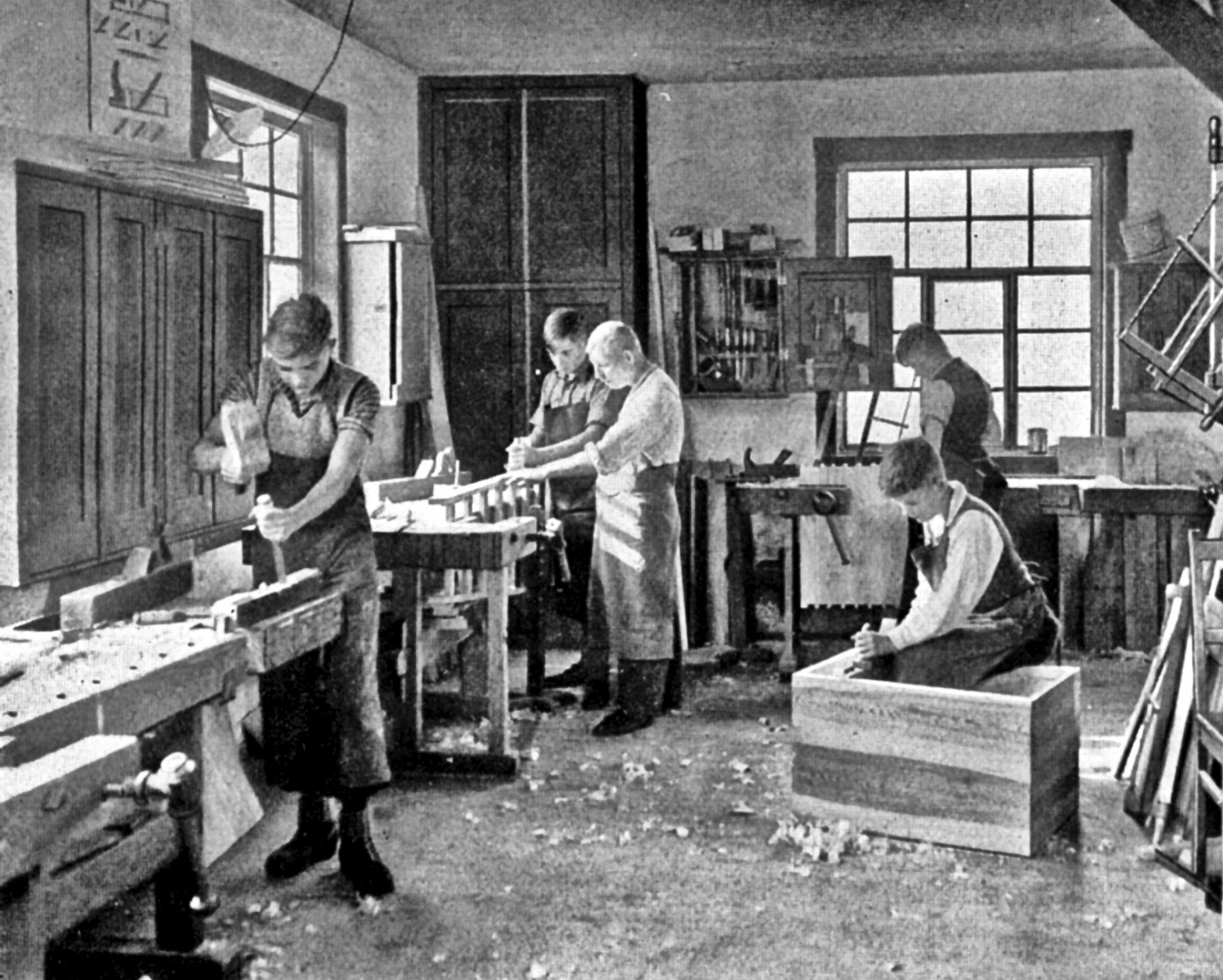
Students in a carpentry trade school learning woodworking skills, c. 1920

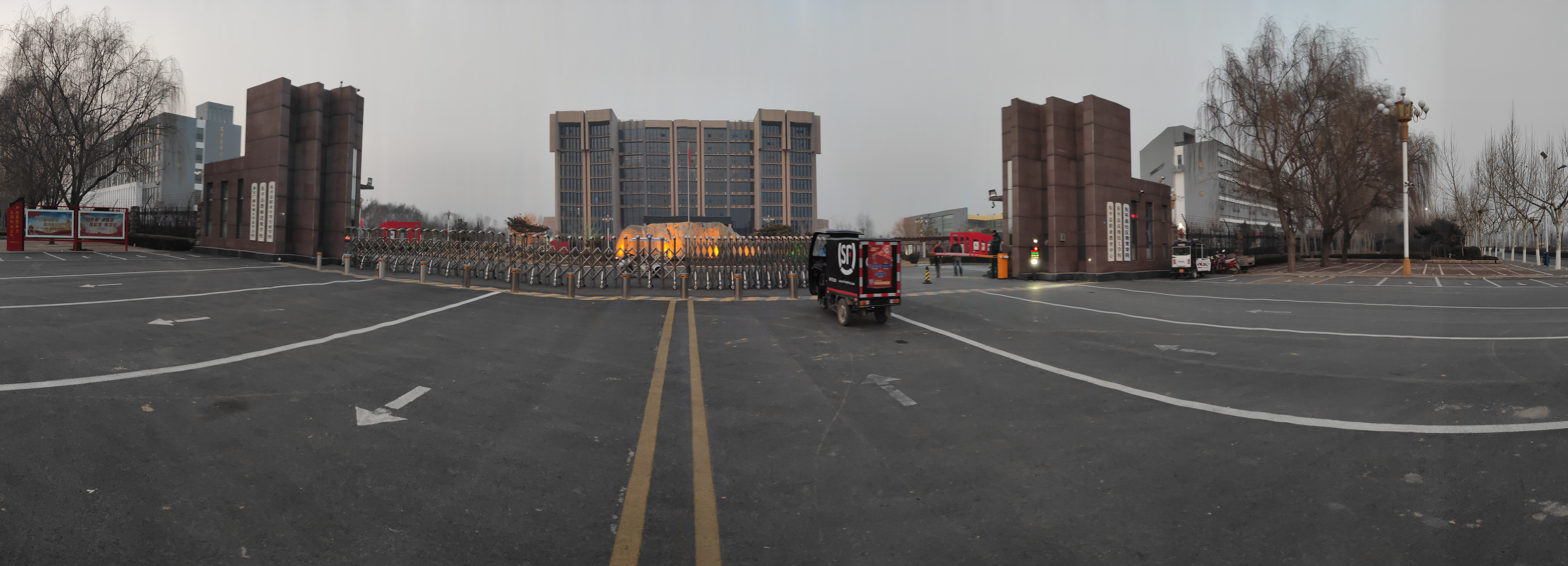
Dongping County Vocational Secondary School, China

A vocational school (alternatively known as trade school or technical school) is a type of educational institution, which, depending on the country, may refer to either secondary or post-secondary education designed to provide vocational education or technical skills required to complete the tasks of a particular and specific job. In the case of secondary education, these schools differ from academic high schools which usually prepare students who aim to pursue tertiary education, rather than enter directly into the workforce. With regard to post-secondary education, vocational schools are traditionally distinguished from four-year colleges by their focus on job-specific training to students who are typically bound for one of the skilled trades, rather than providing academic training for students pursuing careers in a professional discipline. While many schools have largely adhered to this convention, the purely vocational focus of other trade schools began to shift in the 1990s "toward a broader preparation that develops the academic" as well as the technical skills of their students.

== Terminology ==
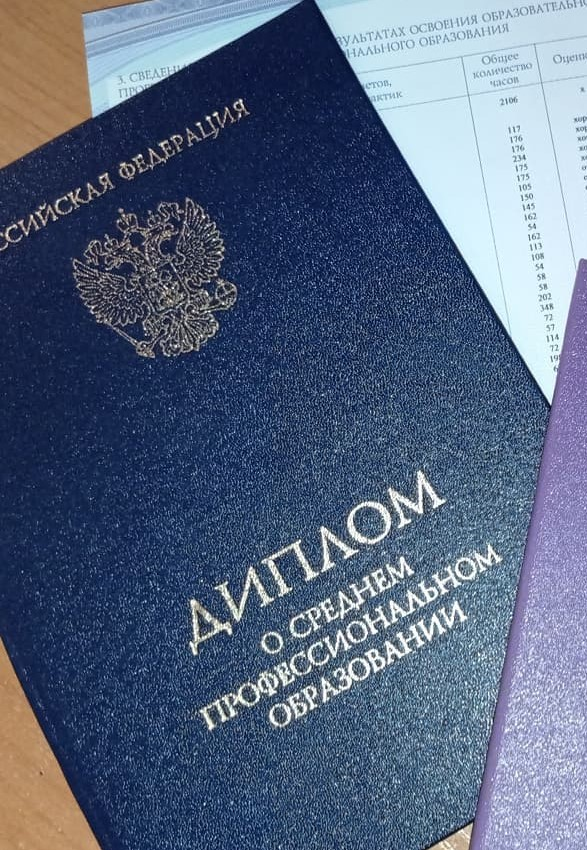
Diploma of secondary vocational education in Russia

This type of institution may also be called a trade school, career center, career college, or vocational college.

== By region ==
=== Oceania ===
==== Australia ====
Vocational schools were called "technical colleges" in Australia, and there were more than 20 schools specializing in vocational educational training (VET). This model of "technical college" has largely been superseded by vocational schools offering courses under a framework known as TAFE. Only four technical colleges remain, and these are now referred to as "trade colleges". At these colleges, students complete a modified year 12 certificate and commence a school-based apprenticeship in a trade of their choice. There are two trade colleges in Queensland; Brisbane, the Gold Coast, Australian Industry Trade College and one in Adelaide, St. Patrick's Technical College, and another in Perth, Australian Trades College.

In Queensland, students can also undertake VET at private and public high schools instead of studying for their overall position (OP), which is a tertiary entrance score. However these students usually undertake more limited vocational education of one day per week whereas in the trade colleges the training is longer.

=== North America ===
==== Canada ====
In Canada, vocational education is primarily offered at the post-secondary level through institutions commonly referred to as career colleges or polytechnic institutes. While the term "vocational school" was once widely used, it began to be phased out in the 1960s and 1970s in favor of more modern terminology.

During the 1960s and 1970s, many Canadian provinces transitioned away from standalone vocational high schools toward integrated secondary schools offering both academic and vocational tracks. This shift aimed to reduce educational stratification and provide students with broader post-graduation options.

Education in Canada is under provincial and territorial jurisdiction, resulting in diverse vocational training systems. For example, Ontario has a robust network of community colleges such as George Brown College, Centennial College, and Fanshawe College, offering diploma and certificate programs in skilled trades, health sciences, and technology. Quebec uses the CEGEP (Collège d’enseignement général et professionnel) system, which includes both pre-university and technical programs. In Alberta, institutions like the Southern Alberta Institute of Technology (SAIT) specialize in applied education in engineering, trades, and business.

Several prominent vocational and polytechnic institutions in Canada include:

- British Columbia Institute of Technology — Established in 1964, BCIT offers a wide range of applied technology programs and is a founding member of Polytechnics Canada.
- Southern Alberta Institute of Technology — Founded in 1916, SAIT is Canada's first publicly funded technical institute, offering over 110 programs in technology, trades, and business.
- Red River College Polytechnic — Manitoba’s largest applied learning institution, RRC Polytech offers over 200 programs and serves more than 21,000 students annually.
- Fanshawe College, based in London, Ontario, one of Canada’s largest colleges, serving over 43,000 students across multiple campuses.
- Centennial College — Ontario’s first public college, established in 1966, offering over 400 diploma, degree, and certificate programs.

Vocational training is also offered at the secondary level through specialized schools such as R.B. Russell Vocational High School in Winnipeg, which provide hands-on programs in automotive repair, culinary arts, construction, and other trades.

In recent years, vocational education in Canada has expanded to include online and hybrid delivery models, enabling greater flexibility for adult learners and working professionals.

==== United States ====
In the United States, there is a very large difference between career college and vocational college. The term career college is generally reserved for post-secondary for-profit institutions. Conversely, vocational schools are government-owned or at least government-supported institutions, requiring two full years of study, and their credits are usually accepted elsewhere in the academic world. In some instances, charter academies or magnet schools may take the place of the final years of high school. Additionally, most schools offer off-campus buildings, or partner with vocational schools in order for students to gain a certificate, as well as gaining the needed credit to graduate. With the dual enrollment, the student would graduate with both their high school diploma, as well as their vocational certificate.

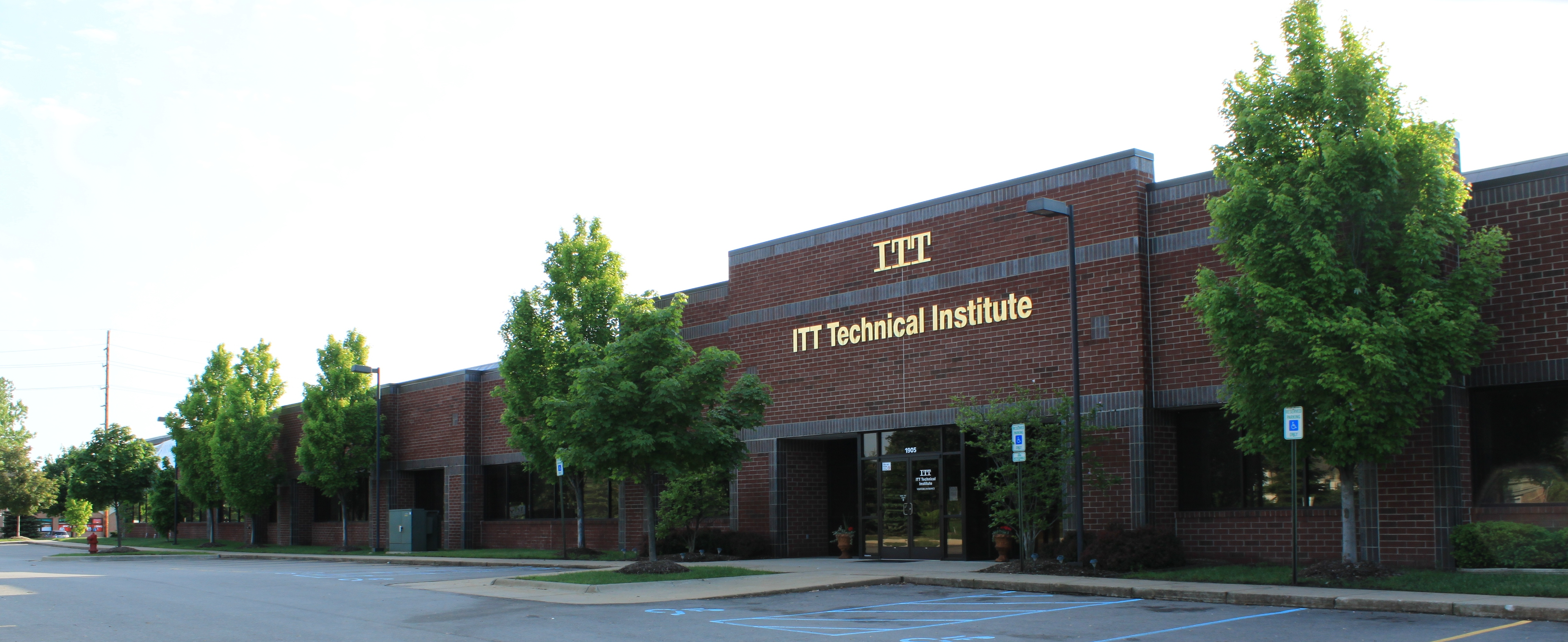
Educational institution of this type in Canton, Michigan, United States

Career colleges on the other hand are generally not government supported in any capacity, occupy periods of study less than a year, and their training and certifications are rarely recognized by the larger academic world. In addition, as most career colleges are private schools, this group may be further subdivided into non-profit schools and proprietary schools, operated for the sole economic benefit of their owners.

As a result of this emphasis on the commercialization of education, a widespread poor reputation for quality was retained by a great number of career colleges for over promising what the job prospects for their graduates would be in their field of study upon completion of their program, and for emphasizing the number of careers from which a student could choose.

Even though the popularity of career colleges has exploded in recent years, the number of government-sponsored vocational schools in the United States has decreased significantly.

The Association for Career and Technical Education (ACTE) is the largest American national education association dedicated to the advancement of career and technical education or vocational education that prepares youth and adults for careers.

Earlier vocational schools such as the California Institute of Technology and Carnegie Technical Schools (now known as Carnegie Mellon University) have gone on to become full degree-granting institutions.

=== Central and Eastern Europe ===
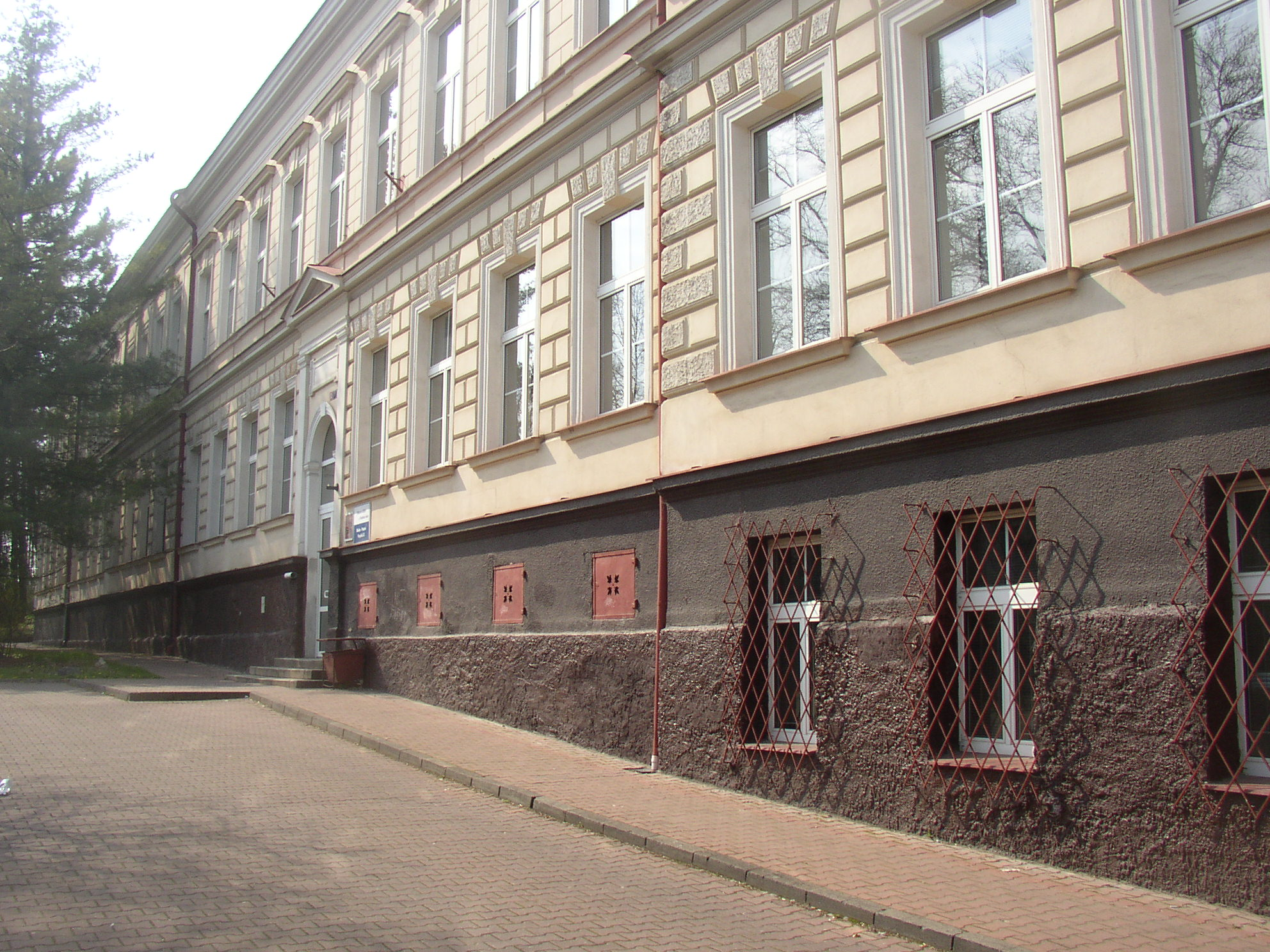
Vrapice Vocational School, Czech Republic

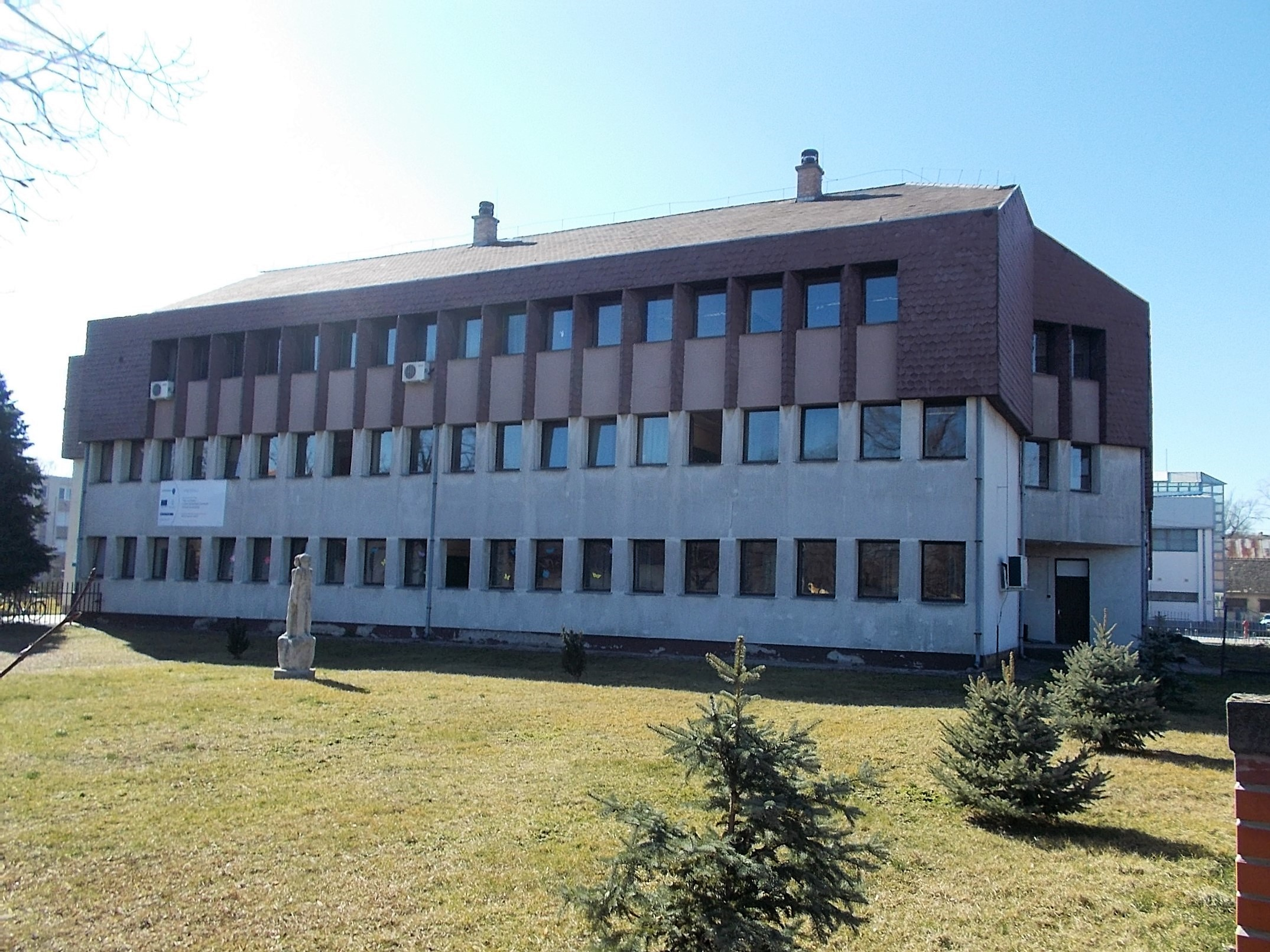
György Dózsa Vocational Secondary School, Kalocsa, Hungary

In Central and Eastern Europe, vocational education is represented in the forms of (professional) vocational technical schools often abbreviated as PTU, technical colleges (technikum) and technical high school.

Vocational school (college)

Vocational school or vocational college is considered a post-secondary education type school, but combines the coursework of a high school and junior college stretching for six years. In Ukraine, the term is used mostly for sports schools sometimes interchangeably with the term college. Such college could be a separate entity or a branch of bigger university. Successful graduates receive a specialist degree.

PTU

PTUs are usually preparatory vocational education and are equivalent to the general education of the third degree in the former Soviet education, providing a lower level of vocational education (apprenticeship). It could be compared to a trade high school. In the 1920-30s, such PTUs were called schools of factory and plant apprenticeship, and later 1940s - vocational schools. Sometime after 1959, the name PTU was established, however, with the reorganization of the Soviet educational system these vocational schools were renamed into lyceums. There were several types of PTUs such as middle city PTU and rural PTU.

Technicum

Technical college (technicum) is becoming an obsolete term for a college in different parts of Central and Eastern Europe. Technicums provided a middle level of vocational education. Aside of technicums and PTU there also were vocational schools (Russian: профессиональные училища) that also provided a middle level of vocational education. In 1920-30s Ukraine, technicums were a (technical) vocational institutes, however, during the 1930-32s Soviet educational reform they were degraded in their accreditation.

Institute

Institutes were considered a higher level of education; however, unlike universities, they were more oriented to a particular trade. With the reorganization of the Soviet education system, most institutes have been renamed as technical universities.

=== Southeast Europe ===
In ex-Yugoslavian countries (Croatia, Serbia, Bosnia and Herzegovina, Slovenia, Montenegro and North Macedonia) there are technical high schools that can have three or four years courses. If a person finishes three year course he will get a trade degree, or a technician degree if he finishes four. After technical high school a person can go to university. In Croatia there are two types of universities where people can continue their education: Classical universities (sveučilište) and Universities of applied sciences (veleučilište). In Universities of applied sciences, after three years students get a bachelors degree like in classical university, and after 5 years they get a professional specialist degree.

==== Greece ====
In Greece vocational school is known as Vocational Lyceum (2006–present), it was named Technical Vocational Lyceum (1985–1998). It is an upper secondary education school (high school) of Greece, with a three-year duration. Some have a wide range of majors, others only a few majors. Vocational majors are in Electrical Installation, Electronics and Automation, Meganotronics, Ventilation and Air-Conditioning Cooling, Nursing, Hairdressing, Graphic Design, Food Technology, Dental Technology, Aesthetic and Makeup, and others.

=== Western and Northern Europe ===
==== Finland ====
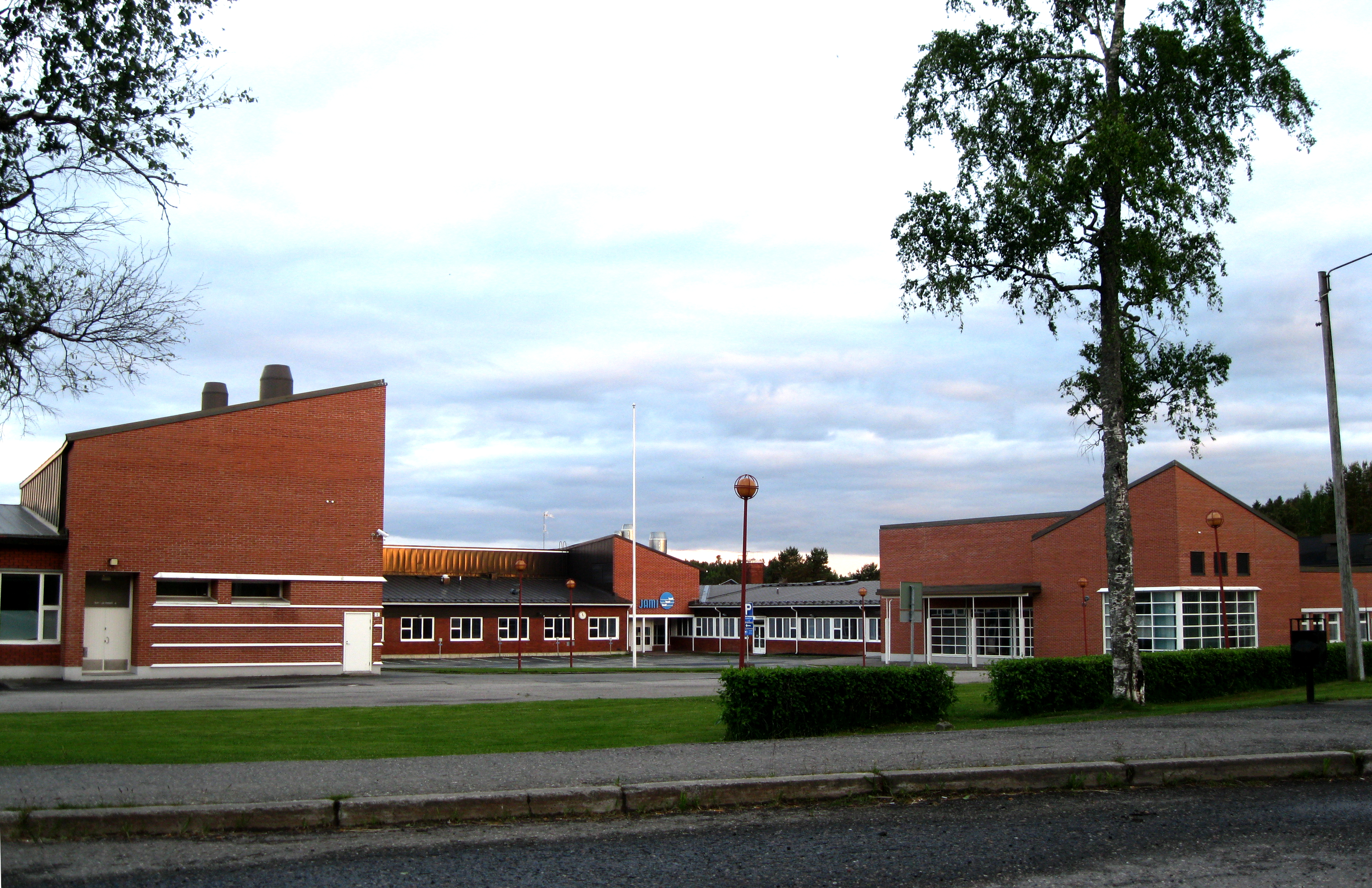
Vocational school in Lappajärvi, Finland

The Finnish system is divided between vocational and academic paths. Currently about 47 percent of Finnish students at age 16 go to vocational school. The vocational school is a secondary school for ages 16–21, and prepares the students for entering the workforce. The curriculum includes little academic general education, while the practical skills of each trade are stressed. The education is divided into eight main categories with a total of about 50 trades. The basic categories of education are

- Humanist and educational branch (typical trade: youth- and free-time director)
- Cultural branch (typical trade: artisan, media-assistant)
- The branch of social sciences, business and merchandise (typical trade: vocational qualification in business and administration (Finnish: merkonomi))
- Natural science (typical trade: IT worker (Finnish: datanomi))
- Technology and traffic (typical trades: machinist, electrician, process worker)
- The branch of natural resources and environment (typical trade: rural entrepreneur, forest worker)
- The branch of social work, health care and physical exercise (typical trade: practical nurse (Finnish: lähihoitaja))
- The branch of travel, catering and domestic economics (typical trade: institutional catering worker)

The vocational schools are usually owned by the municipalities, but in special cases, private or state vocational schools exist. The state grants aid to all vocational schools on the same basis, regardless of the owner. On the other hand, the vocational schools are not allowed to operate for profit. The Ministry of Education issues licences to provide vocational education. In the licence, the municipality or a private entity is given permission to train a yearly quota of students for specific trades. The licence also specifies the area where the school must be located and the languages used in the education.

The vocational school students are selected by the schools on the basis of criteria set by the Ministry of Education. The basic qualification for the study is completed nine-year comprehensive school. Anyone may seek admission in any vocational school regardless of their domicile. In certain trades, bad health or invalidity may be acceptable grounds for refusing admission. The students do not pay tuition and they must be provided with health care and a free daily school lunch. Tools and practice material are provided to the students for free. Any necessary books are also free for all students born during or after 2005.

In tertiary education, there are higher vocational schools (ammattikorkeakoulu which is translated to "polytechnic" or "university of applied sciences"), which give three- to four-year degrees in more involved fields, like engineering (see insinööri (amk)) and nursing. Having a vocational degree also qualifies a person to apply to a university.

In contrast to the vocational school, an academically orientated upper secondary school, or senior high school (Finnish: lukio) teaches no vocational skills. It prepares students for entering the university or a higher vocational school.

==== France ====
===== Lycée professionnel =====
In France, the lycée professionnel (LP, formerly known as a lycée d'enseignement professionnel (LEP)) grants a baccalauréat professionnel for students who do not plan to continue into higher education. Nearly 100 specialties are covered.

===== University Technical Institutes or IUT =====
In France, at post-secondary level, there are also university technical institutes (in French: "instituts universitaires de technologie") offering vocational bachelor's degrees.

==== Ireland ====
A vocational school in Ireland is a type of secondary education school which places a large emphasis on vocational and technical education; this led to some conflict in the 1960s when the Regional Technical College system was in development. Since 2013 the schools have been managed by Education and Training Boards, which replaced Vocational Education Committees which were largely based on city or county boundaries. Establishment of the schools is largely provided by the state; funding is through the block grant system providing about 90% of necessary funding requirements.

Vocational schools typically have further education courses in addition to the traditional courses at secondary level. For instance, post leaving certificate courses which are intended for school leavers and pre-third level education students.

Until the 1970s the vocational schools were seen as inferior to the other schools then available in Ireland. This was mainly because traditional courses such as the leaving certificate were not available at the schools, however this changed with the Investment in Education (1962) report which resulted in an upgrade in their status. Currently about 24% of secondary education students attend these schools.

In 2018, 26% of Leaving Cert students (over 30,000 people) sat the Leaving Certificate Vocational Programme.

==== Netherlands ====
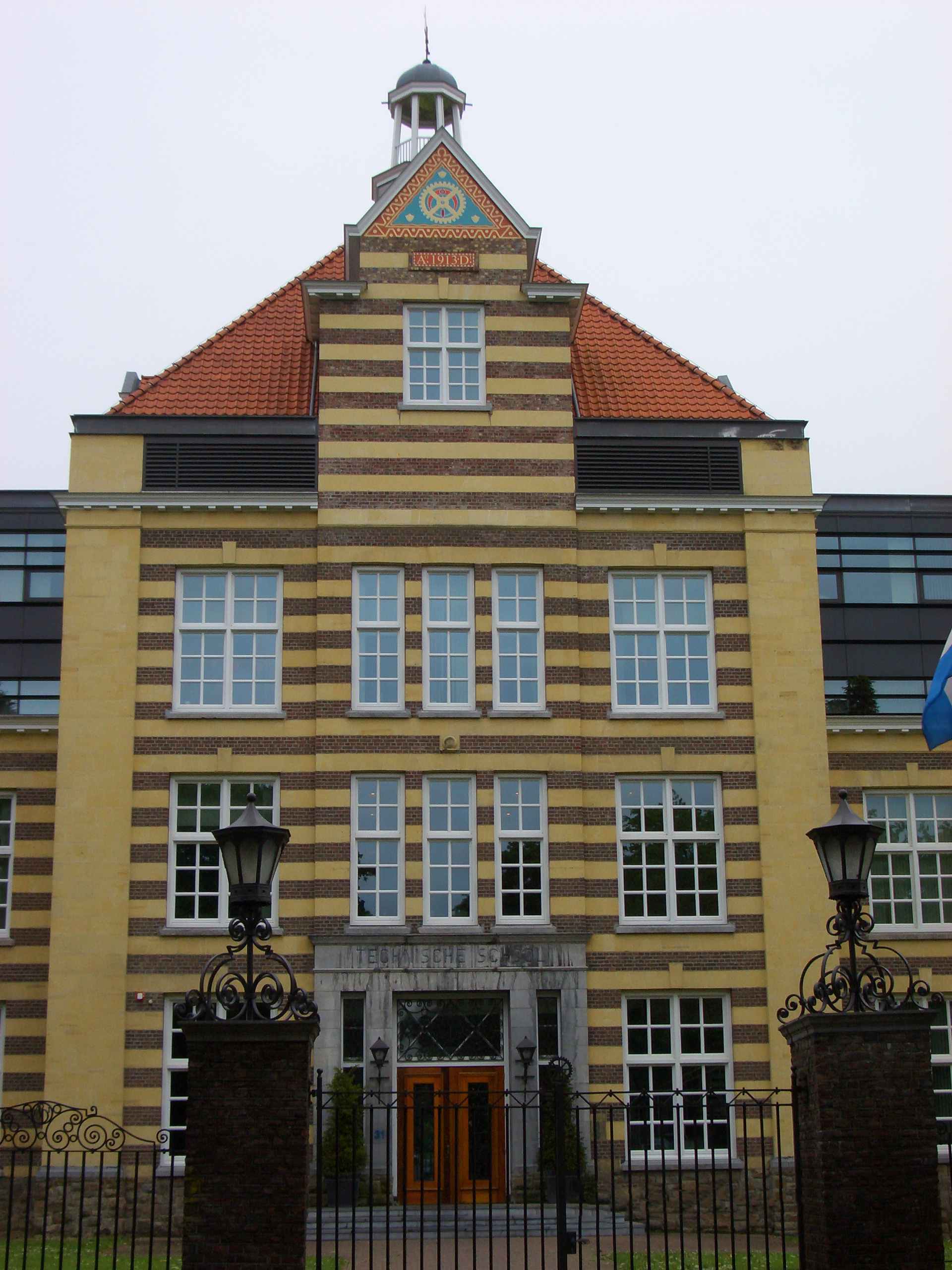
Ambachtschool

In the Middle Ages boys learned a vocation through an apprenticeship. They were usually 10 years old when they entered service, and were first called leerling (apprentice), then gezel (journeyman) and after an exam - sometimes with an example of workmanship called a meesterproef (masterpiece) - they were called meester (master craftsman). In 1795, all of the guilds in the Netherlands were disbanded by Napoleon, and with them the guild vocational schooling system. After the French occupation, in the 1820s, the need for quality education caused more and more cities to form day and evening schools for various trades. In 1854, the society Maatschappij tot verbetering van den werkenden stand (society to improve the working class) was founded in Amsterdam, that changed its name in 1861 to the Maatschappij voor de Werkende Stand (Society for the working class). This society started the first public vocational school (De Ambachtsschool) in Amsterdam, and many cities followed. At first only for boys, later the Huishoudschool (housekeeping) was introduced as vocational schooling for girls. Housekeeping education began in 1888 with the Haagsche Kookschool in The Hague.

In 1968 the Mammoetwet law changed all of this, effectively dissolving the Ambachtsschool and the Huishoudschool. The name was changed to LTS (Lagere technische school, lower technical school), where mainly boys went because of its technical nature, and the other option, where most girls went, was LBO (lager beroepsonderwijs, lower vocational education). In 1992 both LTS and LBO changed to VBO (voorbereidend beroepsonderwijs, preparatory vocational education) and since 1999 VBO together with MAVO (middelbaar algemeen voortgezet onderwijs, intermediate general secondary education) changed to the current VMBO (voorbereidend middelbaar beroepsonderwijs, preparatory intermediate vocational education).

=== Indian Subcontinent ===
==== India ====
In India vocational schools are mainly run by the government under the guidance of the Ministry of Skill Development and Entrepreneurship. Courses offered by the Government of India are Udaan, Polytechnics, Parvaaz, National Rural Livelihood Mission, Industrial Training Institutes, Aajeevika mission of national rural livelihood, Craftsmen Training Scheme. The Skill India movement has empowered the standards of all these institutions. Apart from these the Central Board of Secondary Education (CBSE) has included many vocational subjects in their senior secondary education.

==== Bangladesh ====
See also:BTEB

The Technical and Vocational Education System provides courses related to various applied and practical areas of science, technology and engineering, or focuses on a specific specialized area. Course duration ranges from one month to four years. The Technical Education Board controls technical and vocational training in the secondary level and also Two years HSC BM/Vocational in higher secondary level.

The Directorate of Technical Education (DTE) is responsible for the planning, development, and implementation of technical and vocational education in the country. Curriculum is implemented by BTEB. In the Technical Education System, after obtaining a Diploma-in-Engineering degree (four-year curriculum) from the institutes listed below, students can further pursue their educational career by obtaining a bachelor's degree from Engineering & Technology Universities. It normally it takes an additional two and a half to three years of coursework to obtain a bachelor's degree, although some students take more than three years to do so. They can then enroll in post-graduate studies. Students can also study CA (Chartered Accounting) after passing HSC or bachelor's degree and subject to fulfilling the entry criteria of the Institute of Chartered Accountants of Bangladesh (ICAB). According to Bangladesh Bank, there are 39 C. A firms in Bangladesh eligible for auditing banks and finance companies.

- Bangladesh Sweden Polytechnic Institute
- Barishal Polytechnic Institute
- BCMC College of Engineering & Technology
- Bogura Polytechnic Institute
- Brahmanbaria Polytechnic Institute
- Chittagong Polytechnic Institute
- Dhaka Polytechnic Institute
- Feni Polytechnic Institute
- Graphic Arts Institute
- Jessore Polytechnic Institute
- Khulna Polytechnic Institute
- Kushtia Polytechnic Institute
- Kishoreganj Polytechnic Institute
- Magura polytechnic institute
- Mangrove Institute of Science and Technology
- Mymensingh Polytechnic Institute
- Patuakhali Polytechnic Institute
- Rajshahi Polytechnic Institute
- Sylhet Polytechnic Institute
- Satkhira Polytechnic Institute
- Narsingdi Polytechnic Institute

=== East Asia ===
==== Japan ====
In Japan, vocational schools are known as senmon gakkō (専門学校). They are a part of Japan's higher education system. There are two-year schools that many students study at after finishing high school (although it is not always required that students graduate from high school). Some have a wide range of majors, others only a few majors. Some examples are computer technology, fashion and English.

== See also ==
- Technical college
- Vocational university – Degree-granting applied professional education institution
- Robert-Badinter School Complex
- François I school complex
