= Faiz Ahmed =

Faiz Ahmed may refer to:

- Faiz Ahmed (Hyderabad cricketer) (born 1978), Indian cricketer
- Faiz Ahmed (Railways cricketer) (born 1995), Indian cricketer
- Faiz Ahmad Faiz (1911–1984), Urdu poet
- Faiz Uddin Ahmed (born 1924), former civil servant in East Pakistan, later in Bangladesh
- Fayez Ahmed (civil servant), Bangladeshi civil servant
- Fayez Banihammad, 9/11 hijacker
- Faiz Ahmad, Afghan politician
