= Patuakhali Government College =

Patuakhali Government University College
- Type: Public
- Established: 1957
- Affiliations: National University, Bangladesh
- Principal: Professor Md. Nurul Amin
- Vice Principal: Professor Dr. Md. Matiur Rahman
- Students: Approximately 10,000+
- Location: Banani, Patuakhali – 8600, Patuakhali, Bangladesh; 22.353735°N 90.342285°E
- Campus: Urban
- Language: Bengali, English, Arabic
- Colors: White (Shirt); Black (Pants)
- Nickname: PGC
- Website: https://www.patuakhaligovtcollege.edu.bd/

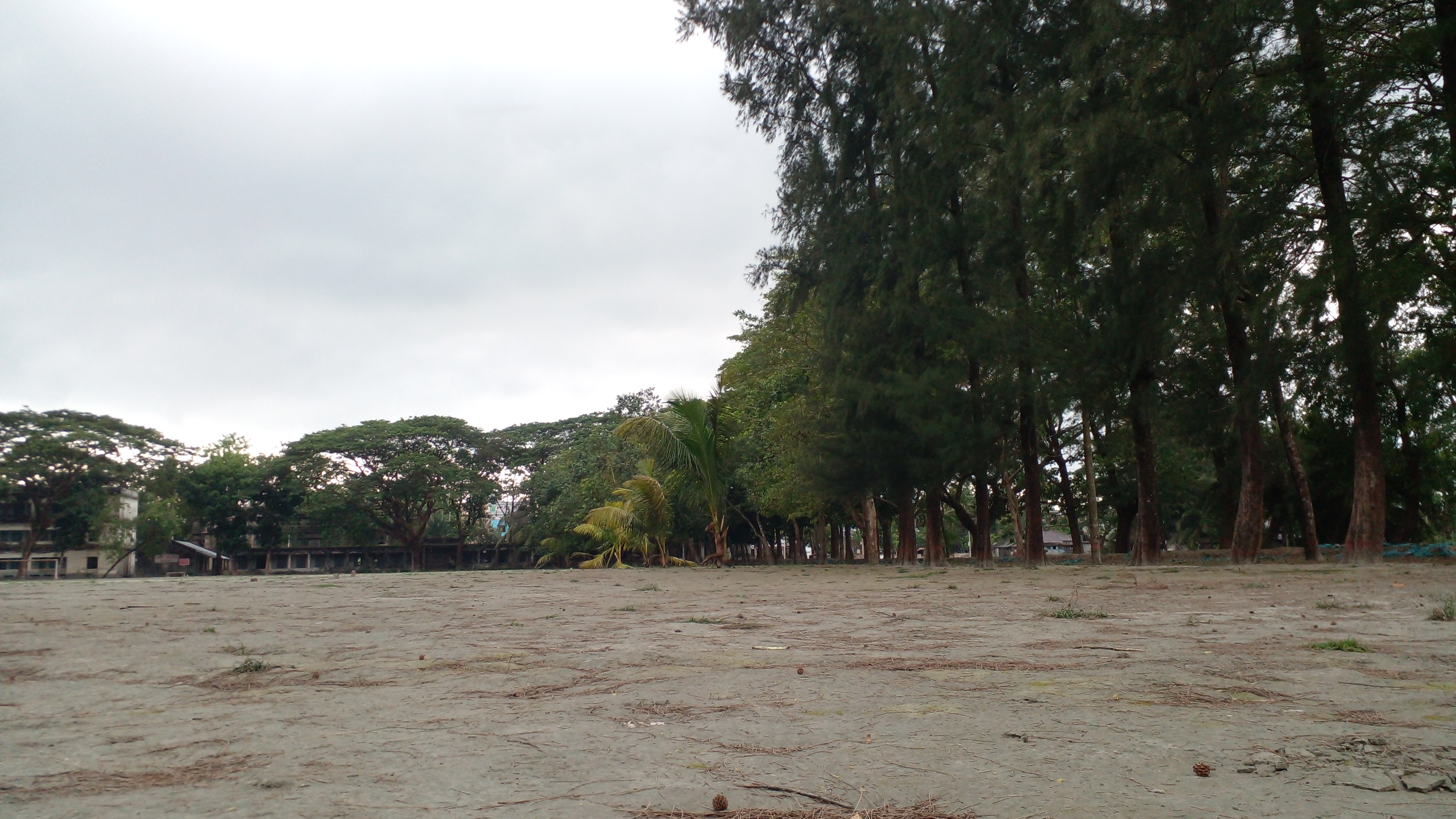
Patuakhali Government College Field

Patuakhali Government University College is one of the leading, traditional and oldest educational institutions in Patuakhali District, Barisal Division, Bangladesh. It is the oldest college in southern Bangladesh. The college offers courses at the Higher Secondary Certificate, Bachelor (Pass), Bachelor (Honours) and Master levels. At the higher secondary and degree levels, instruction is provided in three faculties—Science, Humanities and Business Education—under the control of the Board of Intermediate and Secondary Education, Barisal, while degree and postgraduate programmes are affiliated with the National University.

== History ==
In 1937, Sher-e-Bangla A. K. Fazlul Huq contested and won a seat in the Bengal Legislative Council from Patuakhali against Muslim League leader and Patuakhali zamindar Khaja Nazimuddin. It is said that during the election campaign, he promised the people of Patuakhali that he would establish a college in Patuakhali town. However, due to pressure from residents of Chakhar, he was unable to fulfill that promise.

In 1956, by-elections were held in one seat in Bhola and two in Pirojpur. On the occasion of the election, Prime Minister H. S. Suhrawardy held public meetings in Barisal, Pirojpur and Bhola. At the request of the local MLA and leaders, he pledged to establish a college each in Pirojpur, Patuakhali and Bhola, and a women's college in Barisal. To fulfill this pledge, an organizational committee for Patuakhali College was formed in 1956, convened by the Patuakhali sub-divisional administrator, with local MLAs and education enthusiasts as members. The college formally started its journey on 5 June 1957 with Syed Ahmed Ali appointed as the first principal.

== Donors at the time of establishment ==
1. Forman Ali Mallik, Tepura, Amtali – 10,000 taka
2. Nibaron Chandra Kabiraj, Laxmipur, Dashmina – 6,000 taka
3. Hashem Ali Mallik, Tepura, Amtali – 2,000 taka
4. Nurul Haq Razmiya, Patuakhali – 1,200 taka
5. Motahar Sikder, Amtali – 1,000 taka
6. Abul Hossain Talukdar – 1,000 taka

== Infrastructure ==
There are departments such as Islamic History & Culture, English, and many others. Its EIIN number is 102596.

== Facilities ==
The college maintains a library, a computer laboratory, and a science research laboratory. Facilities for sports and cultural activities are also available to students.

== Notable alumni ==
Former students of the college include:

- KM Nurul Huda, former Chief Election Commissioner
- Fayez Ahmed, former secretary of public administration ministry
- Abdul Malek, former information secretary
