= Baher Char =

Baher Char may refer to:

- Baher Char, Barisal, Bangladesh
- Baher Char, Chittagong, Bangladesh
