= Patuakhali Medical College =

Government medical college in Patuakhali, Bangladesh

- পটুয়াখালী মেডিকেল কলেজ
- Other name: PkMC
- Type: Government Medical College
- Established: 2014; 12 years ago
- Academic affiliations: University of Dhaka
- Principal: Dr. MD. Ziaul Karim
- Director: Principal
- Students: 300+
- Undergraduates: 300+
- Location: Medical College Road, Patuakhali, Patuakhali District, Bangladesh; 22.3629°N 90.3271°E
- Campus: Urban(4.87 acres)
- Language: English
- Nickname: PkMC
- Website: pkmc.college.gov.bd

Patuakhali Medical College (PkMC) (Bengali: পটুয়াখালী মেডিকেল কলেজ) is a government medical school in Bangladesh, established in 2014. It is affiliated with University of Dhaka as a constituent college. It is located in Patuakhali town of Patuakhali District.

It has an annual intake of 100 students for its five-year course of study leading to a Bachelor of Medicine, Bachelor of Surgery (MBBS) degree. A one-year internship after graduation is compulsory for all graduates.

The college is associated with 250-bed Patuakhali General Hospital.

== History ==
The government of Bangladesh established Patuakhali Medical College in 2014, along with new medical colleges at Rangamati, Jamalpur, Manikganj, Tangail, and Sirajganj. Instruction began in 2015.

Students at the college demonstrated in 2015, calling for the reinstatement of the "carry on" examination system. The Bachelor of Medicine, Bachelor of Surgery (MBBS) degree programme is divided into four parts by the first, second, and third professional examinations. If a student fails one of these exams, they may sit it again six months later. Under the 2002 "carry on" system, students could continue taking classes in the next academic session while preparing to retake an exam. This system was strongly favored by medical students, but strongly opposed by their teachers. The Bangladesh Medical and Dental Council eliminated "carry on" in 2013, after which students who failed a professional exam were not allowed to continue classes until they had passed it, causing them to lose up to a year in the process.

== Campus ==
The college is located in Patuakhali town of Patuakhali District, within the compound of 250-bed Patuakhali General Hospital. The hospital began as a 50-bed sadar (district headquarters) hospital. It was expanded in 1979, 2003, and 2005 to 100, 150, and 250 beds respectively. There are plans to convert it to a 500-bed medical college hospital.

A chronic shortage of doctors due to understaffing at the hospital has been reported since 2008. As of November of that year, only 24 of 33 physician positions at the hospital were filled. In June of the following year only 17 of the posts were occupied. The number of long standing vacancies led the Patuakhali Development Foundation to form a human chain to demand action. By 2010, the hospital's approved staffing level had risen to 58 doctors, but the number of positions filled had risen only to 18. The situation deteriorated further until, in 2014, only 16 doctors were serving.

== Organization and administration ==
The founding principal of the college is MA Mannan. Dr. MD. Ziaul Karim is the current (9th) principal of the college.

== Academics ==
The college offers a five-year course of study leading to a Bachelor of Medicine, Bachelor of Surgery (MBBS) degree. After passing the final professional examination, there is a compulsory one-year internship. The internship is a prerequisite for obtaining registration from the BMDC to practice medicine.

Admission for Bangladeshis to the MBBS course at all medical colleges in Bangladesh is controlled centrally by the Directorate General of Health Services (DGHS). It administers an annual, written, multiple choice question admission exam simultaneously across the country. It sets prerequisites for who can take the exam, and sets a minimum pass level. DGHS has varied the admission rules over the years, but historically candidates have been admitted based primarily on their score on this test. Grades at the Secondary School Certificate (SSC) and Higher Secondary School Certificate (HSC) level have also been a factor, as part of a combined score or as a prerequisite for taking the exam. DGHS also admits candidates to fill quotas: freedom fighters descendants, tribal, foreign, and others. Admission for foreign students is based on their SSC and HSC grades. As of July 2014, the college is allowed to admit 100 students annually.

== Clubs, Associations and extracurricular activities ==
- PkMC Debating Club
- Medicine Club
- SANDHANI
- PkMC Adventure Society

In Patuakhali Medical College national days like Independence Day, Victory Day of Bangladesh, International Mother Language Day and festivals like New Year, Pahela Baishakh, Saraswati Puja are observed with various programs.

== Principals ==
| Serial No. | Name | Term of office | |
|---|---|---|---|
| 1. | M.A. Mannan | 19 June 2014 | 20 June 2017 |
| 2. | Mahmudur Rahman | 20 June 2017 | 02 January 2019 |
| 3. | S M Abul Hasan | 02 January 2019 | 14 October 2019 |
| 4. | Mahbubur Rahman (Acting) | 14 October 2019 | 06 November 2019 |
| 5. | Md. Golam Rahman | 06 November 2019 | 12 August 2020 |
| 6. | Md. Faizul Bashar | 12 August 2020 | 05 August 2023 |
| 7. | Md. Moniruzzaman Shahin | 5 August 2023 | 24 Jun 2026 |
| 8. | Dr. F.M. Atiqur Rahaman | 24 Jun 2026 | 28 July 2026 |
| 9. | Dr.Md. Ziaul Karim | 28 July 2026 | Present |

== Vice-Principals (PKMC) ==
| Serial No. | Name | Term of office | |
|---|---|---|---|
| 1. | Dr. MD. Mahmudur Rahman Professor (Gynae & Obs) Current Charge | 15 September 2015 | 20 June 2017 |
| 2. | Dr. S.M. Abul Hassan Associate Professor (Eye) Current Charge | 20 December 2017 | 02 January 2019 |
| 3. | Dr. Mahamudur Rahman Associate Professor (Gynae & Obs) | 5 January 2019 | 5 June 2021 |
| 4. | Dr. Md. Mostafizur Rahman Professor (Pediatrics) Current Charge | 9 September 2021 | 25 October 2024 |
| 4. | Dr. F. M. Atiqur Rahaman | 25 October 2024 | 24 Jun 2026 |

== See also ==
List of medical colleges in Bangladesh
