= Patuakhali-7 =

- Former constituency for the Jatiya Sangsad
- District: Patuakhali District
- Division: Barisal Division

Former constituency
- Created: 1973
- Abolished: 1979
- Last MP: Abdul Barek Mia

Patuakhali-7 was a constituency represented in the Jatiya Sangsad (National Parliament) of Bangladesh. It was located in Patuakhali District.

== History ==
The Patuakhali-7 constituency was created for the first general elections in independent Bangladesh, held in 1973. The constituency was abolished in 1979.

== Members of Parliament ==
Election	Member	Party
1973	Abdul Barek Mia	Bangladesh Awami League
Constituency abolished
