= Latif Municipal Seminary =

Latif Municipal Seminary, Patuakhali
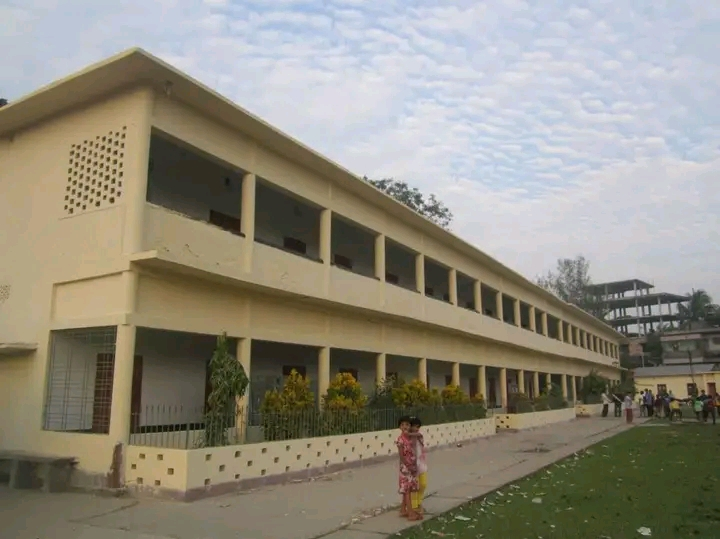

Location
- Patuakhali Municipality, Patuakhali, Barisal Division; Bangladesh
- Coordinates: 22.3584°N 90.3440°E

Information
- Type: Private school
- Motto: Come to learn, go to serve.
- Established: 1916
- School board: Board of Intermediate and Secondary Education, Barisal
- Session: January–December
- Headmaster: Md. Zahir Hossain (Selim)
- Teaching staff: 30
- Grades: Grades 6 to 10
- Gender: Boys
- Enrollment: 750
- Language: Bengali
- Campus size: 10 acre
- Color
- Sports: Football, Cricket
- EIIN: 102480

Latif Municipal Seminary is a traditional, century-old, educational institution in Patuakhali District, Bangladesh.

== History ==
The school began on 1 January 1916 in a small tin shed with just sixteen students. At present, the institution has about 750 students enrolled. Founded in 1916 as the third educational institution of the subdivision, Latif Municipal Seminary originally offered classes from grade one to grade ten. In 1975, when primary education was nationalized, grades one through five separated from Latif Municipal Seminary to become ‘Latif Government Primary School’, which remains located on the same campus. It is known that in 1916, motivated educationist K. M. Abdul Latif—then the Subdivision Magistrate and Administrator of Patuakhali Municipality—initiated the founding of the school. Besides him, community benefactors such as Rai Bahadur Sham Chandra Simlai, Bihari Lal Sengupta, and Ramdhan Chakraborty played key roles in its establishment. The school was named in honour of K. M. Abdul Latif.

During the Liberation War, the school played a significant role, including serving as a training center for freedom fighters.

In 2016, the school reached its centenary. The centennial celebration was held on 22 and 23 December 2016, featuring processions, cultural events, and memorial sessions.

== Institutional structure ==
The school operates in a single session (shift) from Saturday to Thursday (currently Sunday to Thursday) from 10:00 AM to 4:00 PM. Each grade is divided into four sections. Under the supervision of experienced and skilled teachers, the institution provides high-quality education.

== Infrastructure ==
With a history of over 109 years, the school campus now includes three academic buildings and one administrative building. The campus has an auditorium, a mosque, a garage, and a spacious playground in front.

== Educational facilities ==
The school offers one science laboratory, one library, one computer laboratory, and one auditorium. Annual sports competitions are organized each year, and educational trips are arranged for the students.

== Co-curricular activities ==
Several clubs and teams are active for students, including:

- Bangladesh Scouts
- Bangladesh Red Crescent
- Debating Club
- Music Club
- Cricket team
- Football team

== Accommodation ==
Although the school once provided boarding facilities, currently none are available.

== Admission ==
The school offers education from grades 6 to 10. Generally, students are admitted to grades 6–9 during the designated admission period of the year. Prospective applicants must apply according to the prescribed procedure.

== Student dress ==
The official uniform comprises a white shirt (either full- or half-sleeved), black full pants, white sneakers (cads), and socks. A monogrammed badge of the school is affixed to the left pocket of the shirt.

== Sports ==
The school actively participates in sports. In the 2022 National School Football Championship, the team became divisional champions and advanced to the national level.
