= Government Jubilee High School =

Government Jubilee High School may refer to:

- Government Jubilee High School, Sunamganj, a school in Sunamganj, Bangladesh
- Patuakhali Government Jubilee High School, a school in Patuakhali, Bangladesh
