= Satin Sen =

Indian Independence activist (1894 - 1955)

- Born: Satindranath Sen; 15 April 1894; Faridpur District, Bengal Presidency (present-day Bangladesh)
- Died: 25 March 1955 (aged 60); Dacca, East Bengal, Dominion of Pakistan (present-day Bangladesh)
- Organization: Jugantar
- Movement: Indian independence movement

Satindranath Sen, commonly known as Satin Sen (15 April 1894 – 25 March 1955), was a revolutionary in the Indian independence movement in the Indian subcontinent. He was a prominent leader both in the anti-British struggle and in movements against the Pakistani government. A staunch opponent of Partition, he led various movements and lived as a lifelong revolutionary.

== Early life and background ==
Satindranath was born on 15 April 1894 in Kotalipara, Faridpur in Bengal Presidency (now in Bangladesh). His father, Nabin Chandra Sen, was a Muktar at the Barishal court. While studying at Jubilee High School in Patuakhali, young Satīndranāth was inspired by the swadeshi songs of bard Mukunda Das and left home to seek guidance from Mahatma Ashwini Kumar Dutta. The latter sent the ten-year-old back home. Influenced later by friend Sudhir Kumar Dasgupta, he began practicing revolutionary discipline. In Barishal’s Shankar Math, he met Swami Progyanananda and joined the Jugantar revolutionary group. After passing his matriculation from Jubilee High School in 1912, Satīn briefly attended St. Columba’s College in Hazaribagh, then Bangabasi College in Kolkata. He left studies in his fourth year to devote himself fully to revolutionary activities.

== Revolutionary activities ==
Under the leadership of revolutionary Narendra Nath Ghosh Chowdhury, Satīndranāth participated in a swadeshi robbery near Shibpur in Krishnanagar, Nadia district on 30 September 1915. He was arrested and sentenced to four years in prison. After release, he worked in Patuakhali on nonviolent organization. During the 1920 Non-cooperation Movement, he formed a youth brigade, organized boycotts of British goods, and was arrested again. In protest of humiliations in Barishal jail, he undertook a 61-day hunger strike. After release in 1923, he and friends bought land in Patuakhali to establish a national school, where he taught.

In 1924 at the Barishal district Congress conference in Pirojpur, he took charge, walking across the district to counter communal tension fomented by the government. In 1926, he led movements for abolishing Union Board taxes and the Patuakhali Satyagraha, which included parading before mosques with drums and music to assert the right of processions.

Though his movements in Patuakhali succeeded, he was arrested again in 1929. At Lahore jail, alongside revolutionary Jatin Das who was on hunger strike demanding prisoners’ rights, Satīn began an indefinite hunger strike. At Subhas Chandra Bose’s request, he ended it. His action created uproar in Barishal and many local youths voluntarily started serving prison terms. The British authorities released him on bail. He gained prominence among national leaders for organizing student civil disobedience in Kolkata, leading to another arrest. Released in March 1931, he was expelled from Barishal. In 1932 he was arrested again during the second civil disobedience movement and sent to Deuli jail camp, where he protested against disorder in the camp. After his 1937 release, he worked for the daily Kesari in Kolkata. Later he returned to Barishal and during World War II, went to Bhola subdivision for relief work. But when wartime taxes became coercive revenue collection, he obstructed fund gathering and forced refund of some money. For this, he was arrested on 13 August 1942 under the Defence of India Act and imprisoned preventively until 1945.

In 1946, he was elected member of the Bengal Legislative Assembly, defeating Jogendranath Mandal by a large majority. A fierce opponent of Partition, he remained in his district after independence and became a member of Pakistan’s provincial managerial body.

During the violent riots in East Pakistan in 1950, the District Magistrate demanded a peace declaration from him. He refused and was imprisoned in solitary confinement. Though not directly involved in the Language Movement, he was arrested and released a year later.

In a dramatic turn in Pakistani politics, he was arrested again on 1 July 1954. He died in detention on 25 March 1955 at Dhaka Medical College Hospital.

== Role in Patuakhali ==
The Bengal Administrative Report of 1925–26, citing a government press release dated 19 January 1927, records that on 10 May 1926, Hindus defied tradition by holding a procession on the road leading to the Patuakhali district board mosque, even though no festival was underway. That year, public sacrifice of cows during Qurbani occurred openly; in response Satīn Sen decided to organize a procession with drums in front of the mosque as a secular assertion. On 30 August 1926, the procession took place; several participants were arrested. Daily processions followed, leading to repeated arrests, though only fines were imposed. On 19 November 1926, the District Magistrate appointed two Hindu Mahasabha members, two maulanas, and one chairman to negotiate. But Satīn Sen was arrested that day for organizing another procession.

In March 1927, communal tensions arose around the Dol festival in Lakhutia. Responding to calls from the Hindu community, Satīn Sen attempted to go there. Upon learning this, Mr. Blandy and the SP arrested him over tea. In 1927, when Hindus marched past Kulakathi mosque with drums to visit Ponabalia’s Shiva temple, police opened fire killing 19 Muslims. Satīn Sen led a group of his youth organization at the front of the pilgrims’ procession in response.
