= Fayez Ahmed (civil servant) =

Bangladeshi civil servant

Member Bangladesh Public Service Commission
- In office 7 January 2020 – 8 October 2024
- Appointed by: President of Bangladesh
- President: Mohammad Abdul Hamid

Senior Secretary Ministry of Public Administration
- In office 3 July 2018 – 31 December 2019
- Prime Minister: Sheikh Hasina
- Preceded by: Mozammel Haque Khan
- Succeeded by: KM Ali Azam

Personal details
- Born: 1 January 1961 (age 65) Patuakhali Sadar Upazila, Patuakhali District
- Spouse: Tahmina Sultana
- Education: Sher-e-Bangla Agricultural University
- Profession: Civil servant

Fayez Ahmed is a retired Bangladeshi civil servant who most recently served as a member of the Bangladesh Public Service Commission (BPSC). Prior to that, he was Senior Secretary at the Ministry of Public Administration, where he concluded his distinguished civil service career. Before joining the Ministry of Public Administration, he served as Secretary of the Health Education and Family Welfare Division under the Ministry of Health and Family Welfare.

== Early life and education ==
Fayez Ahmed was born on 1 January 1961 in Bhaila village, Vhuria Union, Patuakhali Sadar Upazila, Patuakhali District into a respected Muslim family. His father, the late Fazlul Karim Molla, was a social worker and education enthusiast who donated his property to establish the Fazlul Karim Molla School. Ahmed completed his primary education in Patuakhali and later graduated with honors in Agriculture from Sher-e-Bangla Agricultural College (now Sher-e-Bangla Agricultural University). He also obtained a master's degree in Government and Politics.

== Career ==
Ahmed joined the Bangladesh Civil Service in 1987 under the Agriculture cadre, and in 1988, he switched to the Administration cadre. From 1998 to 2001, he served as Assistant Private Secretary and later Private Secretary to the State Minister of the Ministry of Textiles and Jute. From 2002 to 2006, he was the Upazila Nirbahi Officer of Hossainpur Upazila in Kishoreganj District. Between 2009 and 2012, he served as Deputy Commissioner and District Magistrate of Rajbari and Chattogram.

He also served as Joint Secretary at the Ministry of Environment and Forests and as Additional Secretary at the Ministry of Health and Family Welfare. Before his appointment to the Ministry of Public Administration, he was Secretary of the Health Education and Family Welfare Division. Over his 33-year career, he served with dedication in both the Bangladesh Secretariat and the field administration. On 3 July 2018, he was appointed Senior Secretary to the Ministry of Public Administration.

On 1 January 2020, the President of Bangladesh appointed him as a member of the Bangladesh Public Service Commission for a five-year term. He resigned from BPSC on 8 October 2024. After the fall of the Sheikh Hasina-led Awami League government, he was accused in a murder case related to the death of a protestor by a Bangladesh Nationalist Party politician.

== Personal life ==
His wife, Tahmina Sultana, serves as a Director at the Directorate General of Health Services. They have one son and one daughter.
