= Lohalia River =

Coordinates: 22°20′N 90°25′E

Location
- Country: Bangladesh
- Region: Barisal Division
- District: Barisal District, Patuakhali District

Physical characteristics
- Source: Tentulia River
- Mouth: Rabnabad River
- Length: 93 km (58 mi)

Lohalia River is a river located in the Barisal and Patuakhali districts of southwestern Bangladesh. The river is 93 kilometers long, with an average width of 325 meters, and it has a meandering nature. According to the Bangladesh Water Development Board (BWDB), the Lohalia River has been assigned the identification number “Southwestern River No. 84.”

== Course ==
The Lohalia River originates from the Tentulia River in the Durgapasha Union area of Bakerganj Upazila in Barisal District. It then flows through several unions of the same district — Duhal, Kabai, Kanchipara, Hanuya, Muradia, Lohalia, Amkhola, Gajalia, Golkhali, and Dakuya — before reaching the Chalitabunia Union of Galachipa Upazila in Patuakhali District, where it joins the Rabnabad River. The river widens downstream compared to its upstream portion. Water flow is observed throughout the year, allowing small and medium-sized vessels to navigate it. During the monsoon season, the water flow increases significantly, causing nearby areas to flood. The river is influenced by tidal effects and is recognized by the Bangladesh Inland Water Transport Authority as a third-class navigable route.

Due to encroachment, pollution, and waste dumping, the river is currently under threat.

== See also ==
- List of rivers of Bangladesh
