= Abdul Barek Mia =

Bangladeshi politician

Member of Bangladesh Parliament
- In office 1973–1976

Personal details
- Political party: Awami League

Abdul Barek Mia (Bengali: আব্দুল বারেক মিয়া) is a Awami League politician and a former member of parliament for Patuakhali-7.

== Career ==
Mia was elected to parliament from Patuakhali-7 as an Awami League candidate in 1973.
