= Abdul Hady Talukdar =

Abdul Hady Talukdar (26 October 1905 – 17 July 1985) was a Bangladeshi academic administrator, educationalist, politician, and former registrar of University of Dhaka.

== Early life ==
Talukdar was born on 26 October 1905 into the zamindar family of Patuakhali. He graduated from Barisal Zilla School in 1924 after finishing his Matriculation Examination. He completed his Intermediate in arts in 1926 from Brojomohun College. He completed his B.A. in 1929 and M.A. in 1930 in philosophy from University of Dhaka. In 1932 he went to University College London to study philosophy. He finished another M.A. in philosophy in 1935. He married Begum Nurunnahar Chowdhury, member of Ulania zamindar family, in 1939.

== Career ==
Talukdar joined University of Dhaka as a lecturer in the Department of Philosophy. In the University of Dhaka he served in various bodies including the Academic Council, Committee on Courses in Philosophy, and the Executive Council from 1945 to 1954. He was appointed the Registrar of the University of Dhaka in 1945 and served as the register till 1968. He was awarded the Sitara-i-Imtiaz, the third highest award for civilians in Pakistan, by the government of Pakistan which he renounced after the 1969 uprising in East Pakistan. He served in the committee on establishment of the Islamic University of Bangladesh. He was the president of the Bangladeshi branch of Islamic Academy of Cambridge. He established a number of schools and madrassas.

== Death ==
Talukdar died on 17 July 1985.
