= Baher Char, Barisal =

Baher Char
- Location in Bangladesh
- Coordinates: 22°29′N 90°23′E
- Country: Bangladesh
- Division: Barisal Division
- District: Patuakhali District
- Time zone: UTC+6 (Bangladesh Time)

Baher Char is a village in Patuakhali District in the Barisal Division of southern-central Bangladesh.
