= Patuakhali Government Women's College =

Bangladesh educational institution

- Location: Patuakhali, Barisal Division, Barisal, Bangladesh; 22.3618°N 90.3457°E

Patuakhali Government Women's College is a traditional educational institution in Patuakhali District of Barisal Division, Bangladesh. The college was established in 1966.

== Background ==
In 1956, by-elections were held in one seat in Bhola and two in Pirojpur. Huseyn Shaheed Suhrawardy held public meetings in Barisal, Pirojpur, and Bhola. Responding to demands from local MLAs and community leaders, he pledged to establish one college each in Pirojpur, Patuakhali, and Bhola, and a women's college in Barisal. As part of this effort, the organizing committee of Patuakhali College was formed in 1956, and the college began operations on 5 June 1957. Initially, it operated on the current site of Patuakhali Government Women's College, although the women's college itself was not yet established. The women's college was formally established in 1966.

== Infrastructure ==
The EIIN number of the institution is 102593. To foster contemporary knowledge and science, the college houses a well-stocked library, computer lab, and science research laboratory. For the physical, mental, and cultural development of students, sports equipment and cultural programs are available.
