= Patuakhali Government Girls' High School =

Government school in Patuakhali District, Bangladesh

Coordinates: 22.3607°N 90.3467°E

- Patuakhali District, Barisal Division; Bangladesh

Information
- Type: Government school
- Motto: Rise, women, rise like the flame
- Established: 1919; 1946 (renamed)
- School board: Board of Intermediate and Secondary Education, Barisal
- School district: Patuakhali
- Session: January–December
- Headmaster: Rafiqul Islam
- Grades: 3rd–10th
- Gender: Female
- Age: From 7 to 17
- Language: Bengali
- Sports: Football, Cricket

Patuakhali Government Girls' High School is an educational institution in Patuakhali District, Bangladesh.

== Infrastructure ==
The school was initially established in 1919 as Kalitara Girls' School and adopted its present name in 1946. At present, the school has four academic buildings including the administrative (main) building.

== Notable alumni ==
- Nargis Ara Haque, former MP
