= Patuakhali Polytechnic Institute =

Government Polytechnic Institute of Bangladesh

- পটুয়াখালী পলিটেকনিক ইনস্টিটিউট
- Other names: PPI
- Type: Government polytechnic
- Established: 1989
- Affiliations: BTEB
- Location: Patuakhali, Patuakhali, Bangladesh; 22.3529°N 90.3374°E
- Website: www.ppi.gov.bd

Patuakhali Polytechnic Institute (Bengali: পটুয়াখালী পলিটেকনিক ইনস্টিটিউট) is one of the oldest polytechnic institutes in Bangladesh.

== Departments ==
- Civil Technology
- Electrical Technology
- Electronics Technology
- Computer Technology
- Refrigeration & Air-Conditioning Technology

== See also ==
- Dhaka Polytechnic Institute
