= Secondary School Certificate =

Public examination for school students in India, Bangladesh and Pakistan

The Secondary School Certificate (SSC), Secondary School Leaving Certificate (SSLC), or matriculation examination or just simply matric exam is a public examination in Bangladesh, India, Pakistan, Maldives, and Nepal conducted by educational boards for the successful completion of the secondary education exam in these countries. Students of 10th grade/class ten can appear in these. It is equivalent to the year 10 of the GCSE in England or the first two years of high school in the United States.

== Bangladesh ==
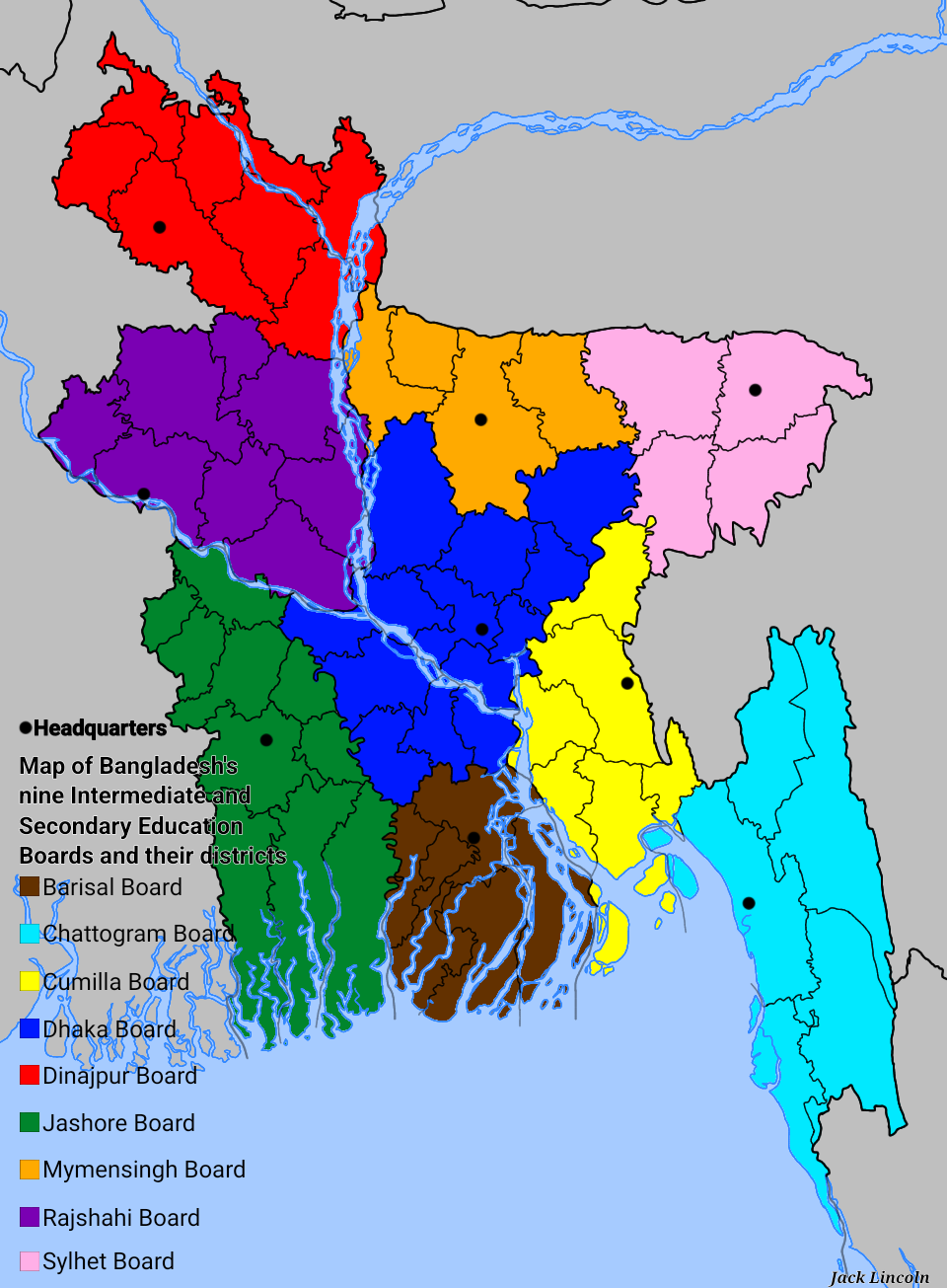
Map of Bangladesh's nine Intermediate and Secondary Education Boards and their districts

The SSC exam is a national-level public examination. This exam marks the end of a student's secondary education. The exam is conducted by various education boards. These boards include the Dhaka Board, Chittagong Board, Rajshahi Board, Barisal Board, and 5 others. Each board is responsible for different regions of the country. Success in this exam is very important. This exam determines eligibility for higher secondary education (Classes 11 and 12). It also plays a significant role in shaping a student's academic and professional future.

== India ==
The Secondary School Certificate (SSC) or Secondary School Leaving Certificate (SSLC) is a certification obtained by high school students upon the passing of a secondary examination at the end of study at the secondary school level in India. The SSC or SSLC is obtained on passing the "Class 10th Public Examination" which is commonly referred to as "Class 10th Board Examinations" in India. The SSC is also known as matriculation in many states of India. The SSC exam is considered one of the most important exams in India. The percentage of your SSC exams determines which field the child will opt for. The SSC exams form a base for HSC exams, which students appear for 2 years after the SSC exams. The exam is also known as board exams. Students of the SSC Board appear for the SSC Board Exams.

== Pakistan ==
The Secondary School Certificate is a public exam for classes 9 and 10 separately. The Class 9 exam is called SSC part-1 and the class 10 exam is called SSC part-2. This exam is conducted by government boards, officially known as Boards of Intermediate and Secondary Education, or simply BISE. Provincial boards conduct the exams at the provincial level, and the Federal Board of Intermediate and Secondary Education conducts the exams at the federal level. Every province has its own boards stationed in the main districts of the provinces. Exams are usually held in March and April. Groups include the science group and the arts/humanities group at the SSC level. In the early 2000s, computer science was added as an option in place of biology, and that is the only option science students can opt for. Upon clearing both the SSC Part-1 and SSC Part-2 examinations, students are awarded the official secondary school certification (SSC) qualification.

== Maldives ==
Secondary School Certificate examinations for Dhivehi and Islam are mandatory for Maldivian students studying in Grade 10. This certificate is checked when accepting job applications in the Maldives for Maldivians.

== See also ==
- Matriculation
- Higher Secondary Certificate (HSC), grade 12
- General Certificate of Secondary Education (GCSE)
- GCE Ordinary Level
- Cambridge International Examinations (CIE)
- Junior School Certificate (JSC), Bangladesh
- Senior Secondary School Certificate (SSC), grade 12 certificate granted in Nigeria through the Senior Secondary School Examination
