= Patuakhali Government Jubilee High School =

Coordinates: 22.3621°N 90.3444°E

- পটুয়াখালী সরকারি জুবিলী উচ্চ বিদ্যালয়
- Patuakhali; Bangladesh

Information
- School type: Government funded secondary school
- Motto: জ্ঞানই শক্তি (Knowledge is Power)
- Established: 1887; 139 years ago
- School board: Board of Intermediate and Secondary Education, Barisal
- Session: January–December
- Headmaster: Mohammad Alauddin
- Grades: 3-10
- Gender: Male
- Age: 7 to 17
- Language: Bengali
- Campus: Patuakhali
- Sports: Football, cricket
- EIIN: 102477

Patuakhali Government Jubilee High School, established in 1887, is one of the oldest schools in Bangladesh. It is located in Patuakhali District.

== History ==
=== Origins ===
In 1876, Axmoy Kumar Dey donated land for a school near the present district post office. There was established Patuakhali Entrance School, for students up to class eight.

At that time the present school location was farmland. In 1884, Sub Divisional Officer (SDO) Foyz Uddin Hossen allotted property for a more permanent structure, and constructed an eight-room, single storied building there. Instruction shifted to the new building on the occasion of the Golden Jubilee of Queen Victoria in 1887, and the school took the name Patuakhali Jubilee High English School in remembrance of the event.

In 1912, the Indian government put the school under the authority of the Education Department. Calcutta University, which regulated and controlled secondary education in Bengal, recognized the school in 1917.

=== Nationalization ===
In 1952, the school enlisted in the Uplift Scheme. In 1962, it participated in the Multilateral Scheme. It took its current name when it was nationalized on 15 November 1968.

== Present day ==
In January 2013, the school observed its 125th anniversary. Former alumni have held important positions in Bangladesh, including Minister Shahjahan Mia, Justice Mohammed Nizamul Huq and Additional Deputy Attorney General MK Rahman.
