= Ratan Lal Chakraborty =

- Born: 1951; Backergunge District, East Bengal, Dominion of Pakistan
- Died: 1 December 2020 (aged 68–69); Dhaka, Bangladesh
- Occupation: Professor

Ratan Lal Chakraborty (1951 – 1 December 2020) was a Bangladeshi researcher and historian.

== Early life ==
Ratan Lal Chakraborty was born in 1951 in Patuakhali, then part of East Bengal, Pakistan. His father Suresh Chandra Chakraborty was a schoolteacher by profession.

== Career ==
Ratan Lal Chakraborty edited about 35 research books. Notable among his works are Bangladesher Swadhinata Sangrame Dhaka Bishwavidyalay, The Black August 1975, and Rajarosh. Until his death, he was serving as the editor of the book History of Dhaka University, published to mark the university's centenary. Throughout his career, he was a professor in the Department of History at both University of Dhaka and Jahangirnagar University.

== Death ==
Ratan Lal Chakraborty died of COVID-19 on 1 December 2020 while undergoing treatment at Popular Medical College Hospital in Dhaka. Earlier, on 7 November, he was admitted to the hospital due to diabetes and kidney-related complications.
