= Faiz Uddin Ahmed =

Bangladeshi civil servant (born 1924)

- ফায়েজ উদ্দিন আহমেদ

4th Chairman of Bangladesh Public Service Commission
- In office 22 December 1982 – 31 May 1986
- Appointed by: Ahsanuddin Chowdhury
- President: Ahsanuddin Chowdhury; Hussain Muhammad Ershad
- Preceded by: M. Moydul Islam
- Succeeded by: S. M. Al Hussaini

Personal details
- Born: 1924
- Citizenship: Bangladesh

Faiz Uddin Ahmed (born 1924) is a Bangladeshi former civil servant, originally at the provincial level in East Pakistan, later in Bangladesh. He was the fourth chairman of the Bangladesh Public Service Commission (BPSC).

== Career ==
Ahmed was recruited into the provincial East Pakistan Civil Service (EPCS) in 1948.

Ahmed joined the Provisional Government of Bangladesh in 1971. He was appointed secretary of the Establishment Division of the Cabinet Secretariat in September 1978. In December 1982, he became chairman of the Bangladesh Public Service Commission, a post he held until 1986.
