= Board of Intermediate and Secondary Education, Barisal =

Coordinates: 22.716808°N 90.347369°E

The Board of Intermediate and Secondary Education, Barisal
- মাধ্যমিক ও উচ্চ মাধ্যমিক শিক্ষা বোর্ড, বরিশাল
- The logo of Board of Intermediate and Secondary Education

Board overview
- Formed: 1999; 26 years ago
- Jurisdiction: Government of Bangladesh
- Headquarters: Notullaha Bad, Kashipur, Barisal
- Board executive: Prof. Abbas Uddin Khan, Chairman
- Parent department: Ministry of Education
- Website: barisalboard.gov.bd

The Board of Intermediate and Secondary Education in Barisal, Bangladesh, is an autonomous organization mainly responsible for holding JSC, SSC and HSC and for providing recognition to the newly established non-government educational institutions and also for the supervision, control and developments of those institutions. It started the operation in 1999.

== Background ==
The Board of Intermediate and Secondary Education, Barisal (here in after referred as BISE) started its operation in 1999. It is an autonomous and self-regulating organization in the field of educational administration and management in Bangladesh. Considering the growing demand for both qualitative and quantitative education in the country, the BISE-Barisal is trying to develop it as a center of excellence in the field of educational administration. Its focuses are improvement inspection and providing assistance in forming managing committees of schools and colleges, controlling student enrollment in schools and colleges, improvement in physical education and sportsmanship of students and organization of three important public examinations-J.S.C. (Junior School Certificate) S.S.C. (Secondary School Certificate) and H.S.C. (Higher Secondary Certificate) Examinations of Barisal division. It also gives scholarships to meritorious students based on the results.

== Mission ==
The prime objective of the Board is to ensure proper patronage of a relevant education to students both at Secondary and Higher Secondary level. In order to justify its object Board is focused on the proper development of schools/colleges up to the standard commensurate with national expectation. Recruitment of qualified teachers together with the development of infrastructure facilities also features Board's priorities. We also insist on instilling the values of our national & traditional heritage linguistic aspiration, cultural and historical direction through the formulation of proper syllabus and curriculum in order for the mental and intellectual development of the students in the long-term national interest. The Board is therefore focused on improvement in the quality of inspection of schools and colleges. For proper of running of school and college administration, it provides support to forming Managing Committees for schools and Governing Bodies for colleges. It also gives scholarships to meritorious students based on individual academic performances.

== District under Barisal Education Board ==
- Barguna District
- Barisal District
- Bhola District
- Jhalokati District
- Patuakhali District
- Pirojpur District

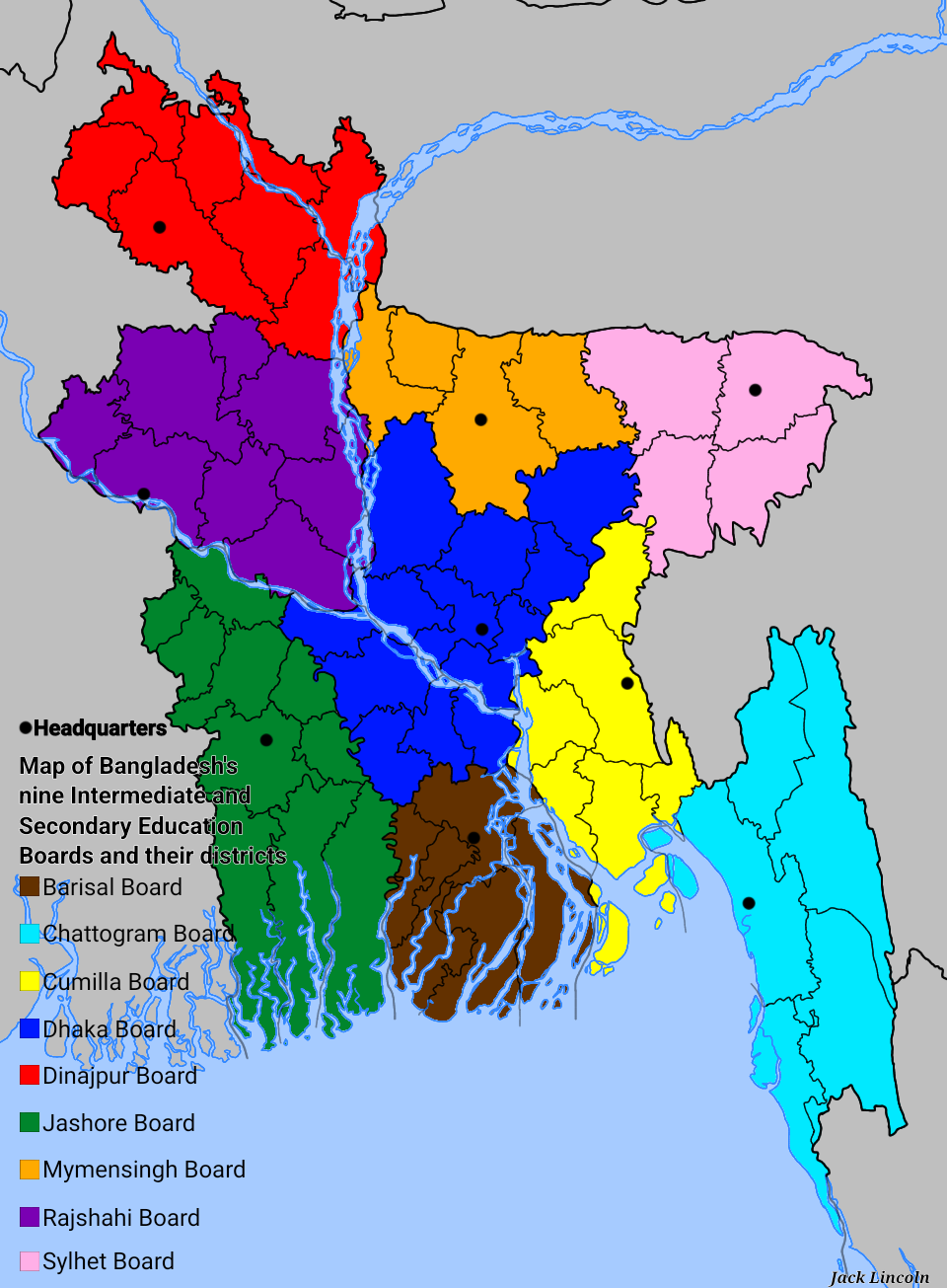
Map of Bangladesh's nine Intermediate and Secondary Education Boards and their districts

== See also ==
- List of Education Boards in Bangladesh
