= Patuakhali Sadar Upazila =

Patuakhali Sadar পটুয়াখালী সদর
- Upazila
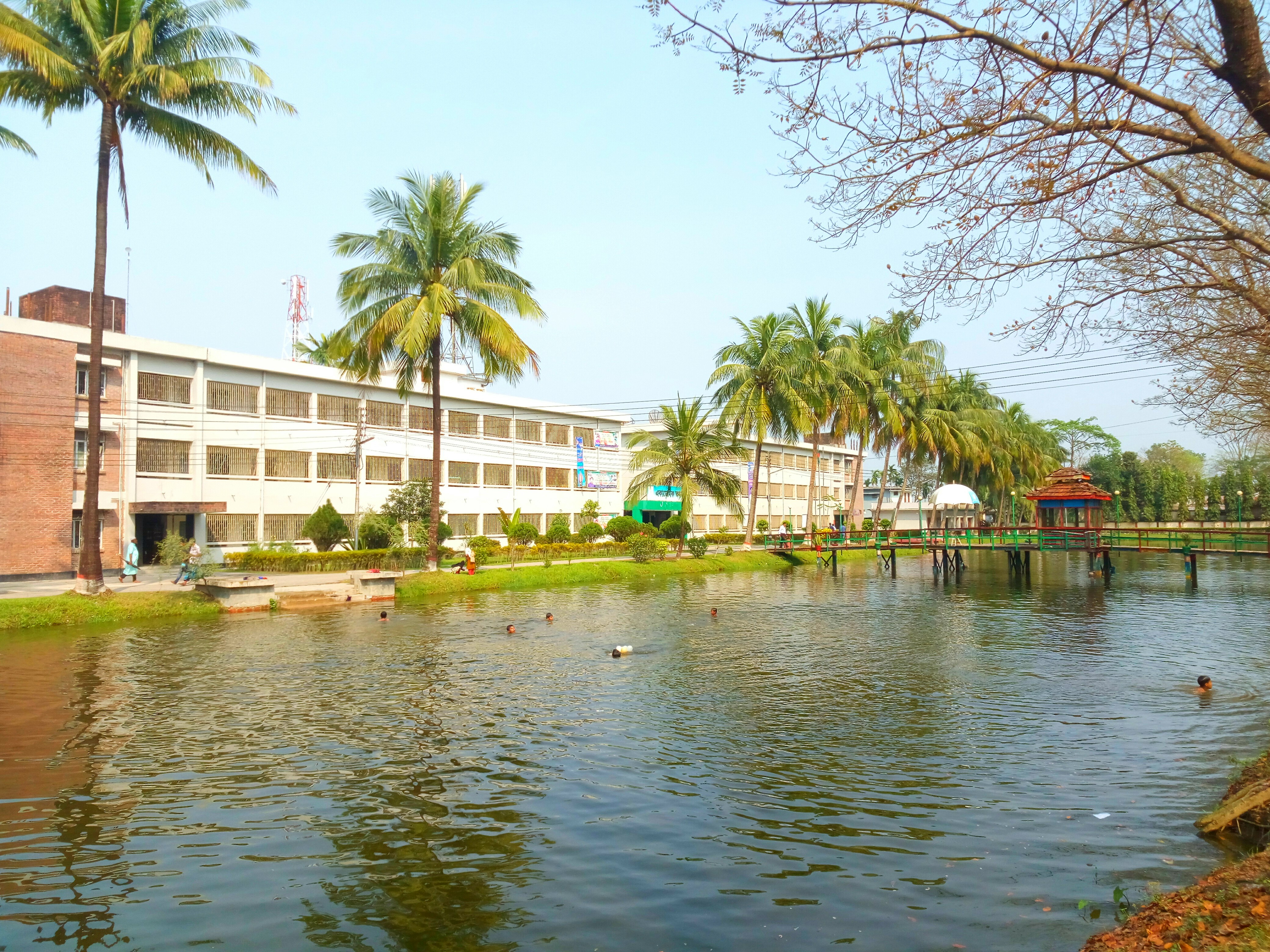
- Lake in Patuakhali Science and Technology University

- Coordinates: 22°21.3′N 90°19.1′E
- Country: Bangladesh
- Division: Barisal
- District: Patuakhali
- Headquarters: Patuakhali

Area
  - Total: 362.46 km^{2} (139.95 sq mi)

Population (2022)
  - Total: 354,816
  - Density: 978.91/km^{2} (2,535.4/sq mi)
- Time zone: UTC+6 (BST)
- Postal code: 8600
- Area code: 0441
- Website: Official Map of the Patuakhali Sadar Upazila

Patuakhali Sadar Upazila mauza geocode map

Patuakhali Sadar (Bengali: পটুয়াখালী সদর) is an upazila of Patuakhali District in the Division of Barisal, Bangladesh.

== Geography ==
Patuakhali Sadar is located at 22.3542°N 90.3181°E. It has 55,194 households and a total area of 362.62 km^{2}.

== Demographics ==
Religions in Patuakhali Sadar Upazila (2022)
Religion	Percent
Islam	93.37%
Hinduism	6.58%
Other or not stated	0.05%

According to the 2022 Bangladeshi census, Patuakhali Sadar Upazila had 85,501 households and a population of 354,816. 9.41% of the population were under 5 years of age. Patuakhali Sadar had a literacy rate (age 7 and over) of 79.44%: 81.86% for males and 77.15% for females, and a sex ratio of 95.77 males for every 100 females. 108,691 (30.63%) lived in urban areas.

According to the 2011 Census of Bangladesh, Patuakhali Sadar Upazila had 68,813 households and a population of 316,462. 70,816 (22.38%) were under 10 years of age. Patuakhali Sadar had a literacy rate (age 7 and over) of 59.52%, compared to the national average of 51.8%, and a sex ratio of 1037 females per 1000 males. 69,837 (22.07%) lived in urban areas.

According to the 1991 Bangladesh census, Patuakhali Sadar had a population of 306,517. Males constituted 50.12% of the population, and females 49.88%. The population aged 18 or over was 152,588. Patuakhali Sadar had an average literacy rate of 42.6% (7+ years), compared to the national average of 32.4%.

== Administration ==
Patuakhali Sadar Upazila is divided into Patuakhali Municipality and 12 union parishads: Auliapur, Badarpur, Boro Bighai, Choto Bighai, Itbaria, Jainkathi, Kalikapur, Kamalapur, Laukathi, Lohalia, Madarbunia, and Marichbunia. The union parishads are subdivided into 101 mauzas and 124 villages.

Patuakhali Municipality is subdivided into 9 wards and 29 mahallas.

The chairman of shodor upozila chairman Md. Golam Sarowar.

== See also ==
- Upazilas of Bangladesh
- Districts of Bangladesh
- Divisions of Bangladesh
