= Patuakhali District =

Patuakhali District পটুআখালি জেলা
- District of Bangladesh
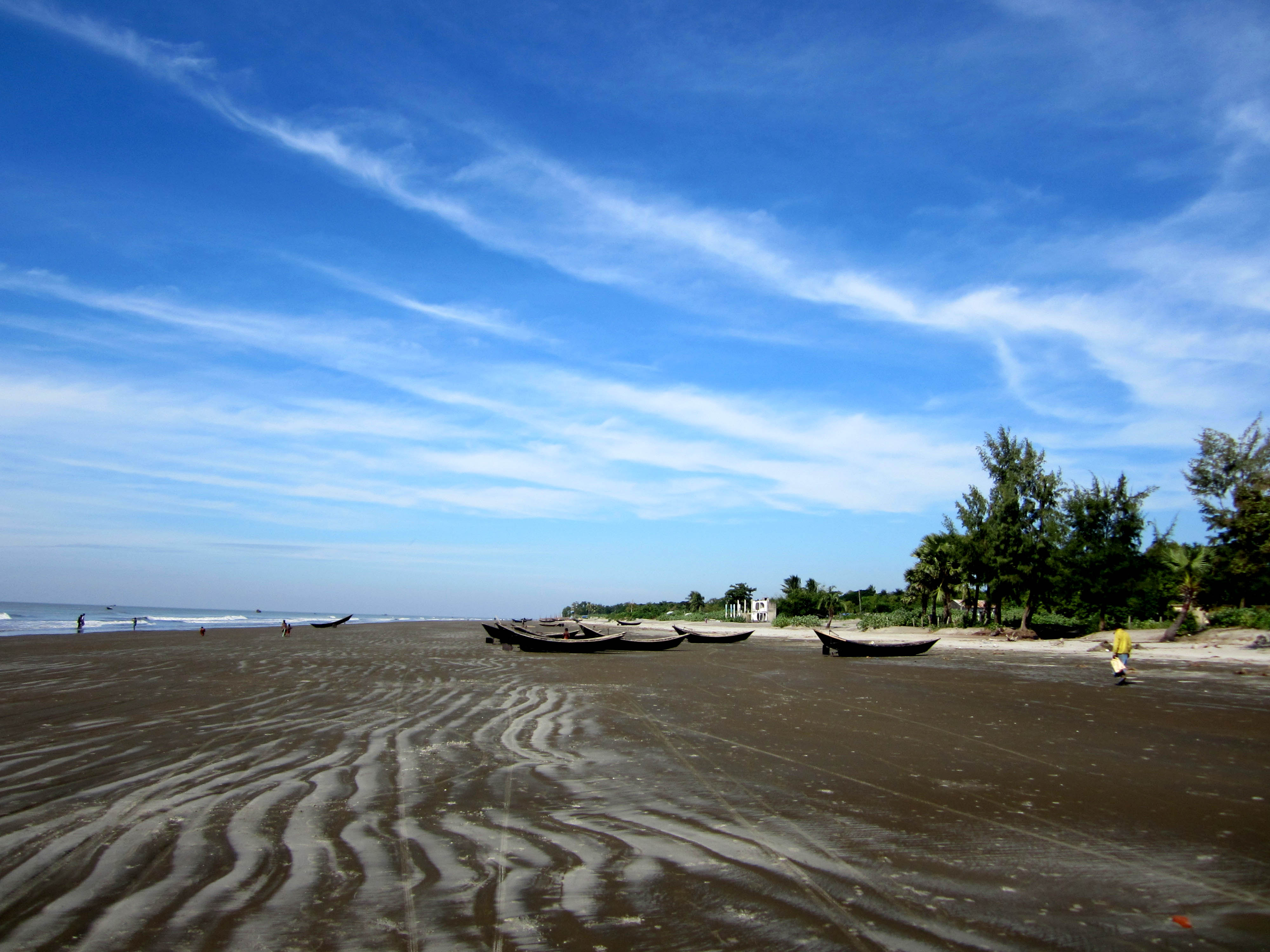
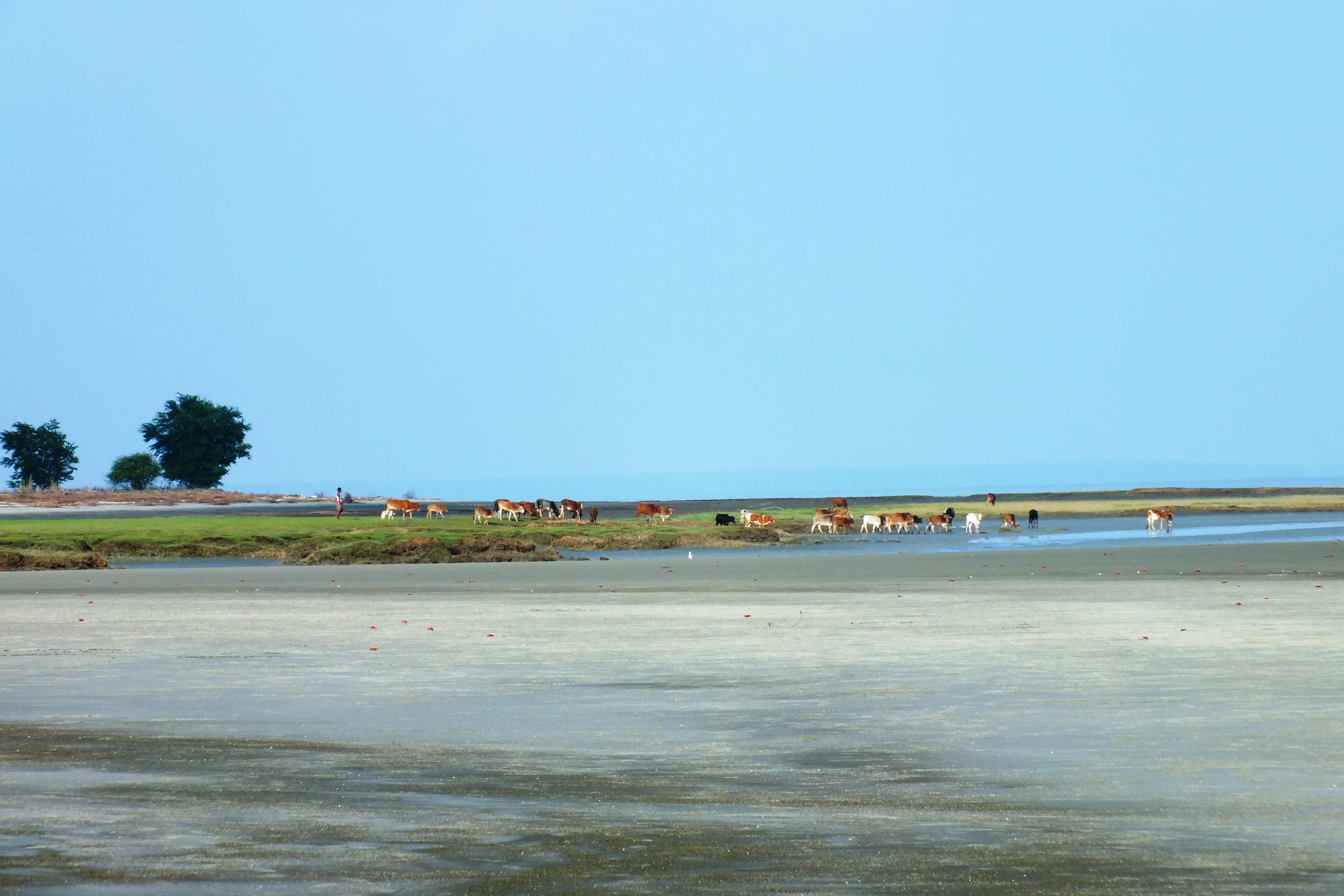
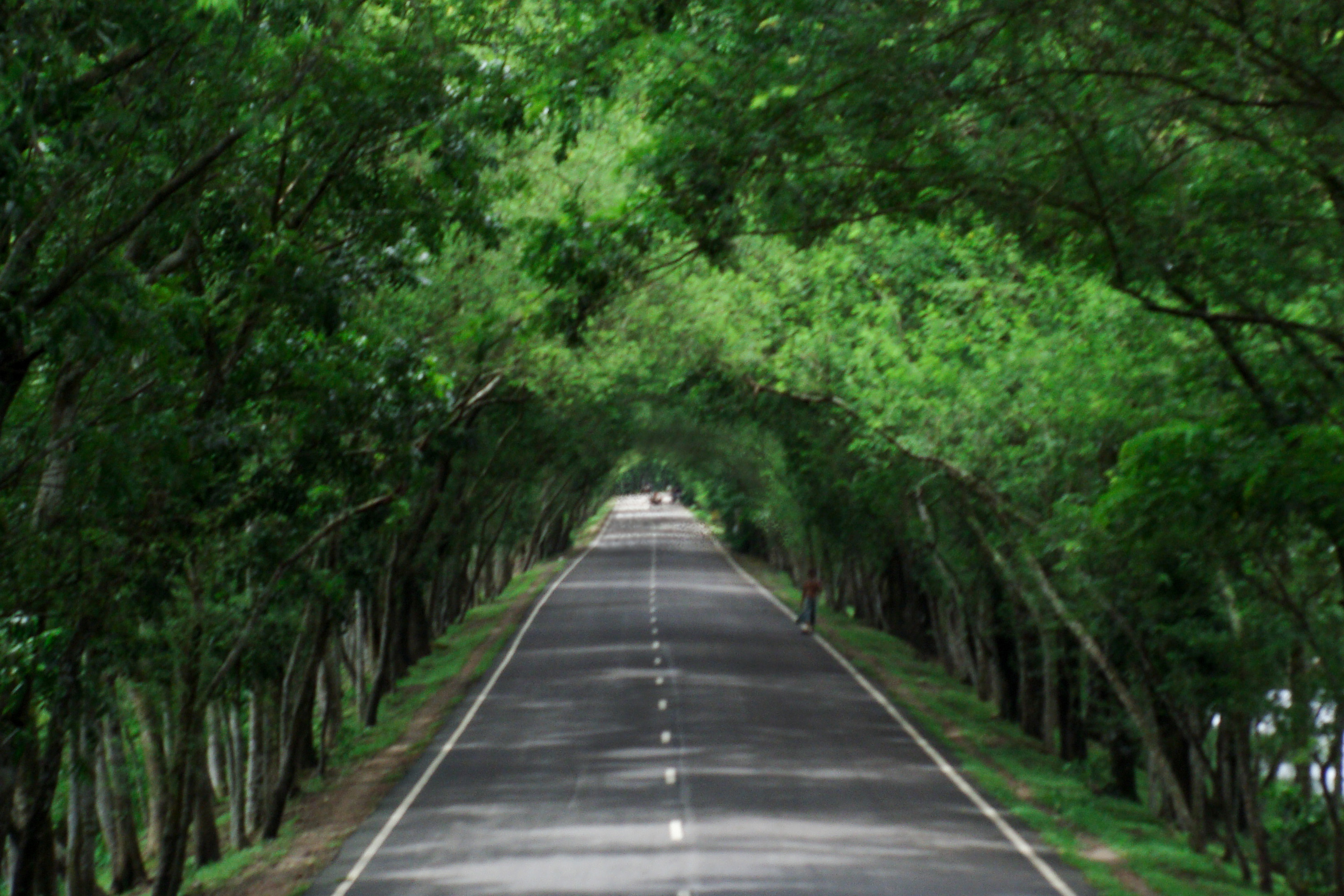
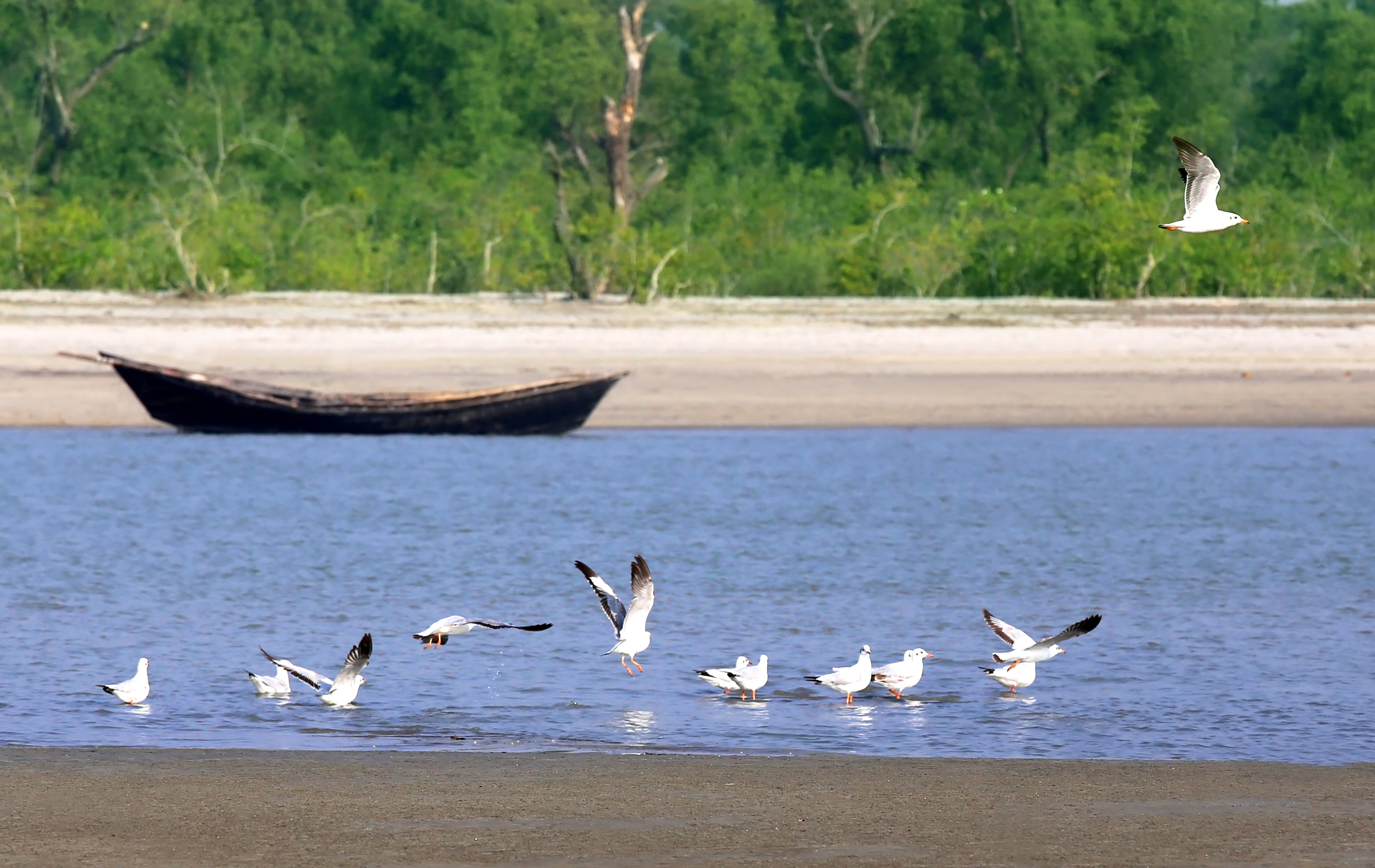
- Clockwise from left-right: Kuakata beach, Barishal-Patuakhali road, Sonarchar Wildlife Sanctuary, Sunset at Kuakata Beach
- Nickname: সাগরকন্যা (Daughter of the Sea)
- Location of Patuakhali in Bangladesh
- Expandable map of Patuakhali District
- Coordinates: 22.3542°N 90.3181°E
- Country: Bangladesh
- Division: Barisal Division
- Patuakhali: 1 January 1969
- Headquarters: Patuakhali

Government
  - Deputy Commissioner: Mohammed Kamal Hosean

Area
  - Total: 3,221.31 km^{2} (1,243.75 sq mi)

Population (2022)
  - Total: 1,727,254
  - Density: 536.196/km^{2} (1,388.74/sq mi)
- Time zone: UTC+06:00 (BST)
- Postal code: 8600
- Area code: 0441
- ISO 3166 code: BD-51
- HDI (2018): 0.586 medium · 16th of 21
- Website: www.patuakhali.gov.bd

Patuakhali District (Bengali: পটুয়াখালী জেলা, romanized: Pôṭuakhali jela) is a district in south-central Bangladesh in Barisal Division. This district is the main entrance for the beach of Kuakata.

== History ==
The early history of Patuakhali is little known. In medieval times, the northern part of the district was part of the Chandradwip Kingdom, also called Bakla. The kingdom had its capital at Kachua in present Bauphal Upazila. Beginning in the middle 16th century, the kingdom began facing attacks from Portuguese and Magh pirates, so the kings shifted to Madhabpasha in present Barishal district. After the conquest of Bakla, Akbar's administrator Todarmal sent the quanungo Jimmak Khan to survey the region. He split up the still mainly forested southern part of Barisal as Bazuhadba, and later the region was split up into three parganas: Salimbada, Bajuk Umedpur and Uranpur. This southern part of Barisal region, which was still largely uninhabited, was colonized by Muslim pirs who introduced the local population to settled agriculture and spread Islamic beliefs among the local population, leading to the overwhelming majority developing an Islamic identity by the 19th century. In the 18th century, Rakhines fleeing the Burmese invasion of Arakan came to Bengal, with many settling on the deltaic islands especially in the southern upazilas of present Patuakhali. After the Rakhine arrival, this area became more populated with mostly Bengali Muslim cultivators. Patuakhali was made part of the Bakerganj District by the British. Eventually Patuakhali became a mahakuma of the district.

After the Partition of India, Patuakhali became part of East Pakistan. In 1969, Patuakhali mahakuma was made a separate district. In 1984, five upazilas of the district were split up into the new Barguna district.

== Geography ==
It is adjacent to the Bay of Bengal. The area of the district is 3,221.31 km^{2}.

Patuakhali city is surrounded on three sides by rivers. The two major rivers are Laukathi and Lohalia, which are directly connected with the Bay of Bengal. The city has an inland airport used for transport and private travel across the country.

== Administration ==
Patuakhali District upazila geocode map

There are 8 upazilas in this district. They are:

1. Dumki Upazila
2. Patuakhali Sadar Upazila
3. Mirzaganj Upazila
4. Bauphal Upazila
5. Galachipa Upazila
6. Dashmina Upazila
7. Rangabali Upazila
8. Kalapara Upazila
- Administrator of District Council: Khalilur Rahman Mohon
- Deputy Commissioner (DC): MD. Matiul Islam Chawdhury
- Superintendent of Police (SP): Md.Shahidullah PPM

== Economy ==
Agriculture is the profession of most of the people. Fishing is also a prominent profession of this district. Thousands of boats go into the deep sea to fish and come back with tons of fish. Paddy, jute, and different types of vegetables are the main product of agriculture sector. Main sources of income Agriculture 57.05%, non-agricultural labourer 5.37%, industry 1.03%, commerce 13.79%, transport and communication 2.04%, service 9.22%, construction 2.13%, religious service 0.26%, rent and remittance 0.40% and others 8.71%.

=== Crops ===
Main Crops of Patuakhali district areas as follows:

1. Paddy
2. Jute
3. Potato
4. Pea
5. Lentil
6. Gram
7. sesame
8. Chilli
9. mustard
10. Linseed
11. Coriander seed
12. Peanut
13. betel leaf
14. Sugarcane
15. Watermelon
16. Vegetables

=== Fruits ===
The fruit trees indigenous to Patuakhali district areas as follows:

1. Mango
2. Banana
3. Guava
4. Jamun
5. Custard-apple or আতা
6. Tamarind
7. Grapefruit
8. Lime
9. Jackfruit
10. Papaya
11. Pineapple
12. Bengal almond
13. Lichi
14. Pomegranate
15. Palm or Tal
16. Common fig
17. Haritaki
18. Date – scarce
19. Coconut – scarce

== Education ==
In 2011, the literacy rate of Patuakhali was 54.1%; male 56.2% and female 52.0%. Educational institutions: university 1, agricultural and veterinary college 1, college 65, technical and vocational institutes 6, secondary school 288, primary school 1152, kindergarten 36, madrasa 506.

Universities

- Patuakhali Science and Technology University

Medical College

- Patuakhali Medical College

Colleges

- Patuakhali Government College
- Patuakhali Government Women's College
- Abdul Karim Mridha College
- Idris Molla Mahavidyalaya
- Bauphal Govt College
- Subidkhali Mohila College
- Kalapara Govt College
- Government Janata College
- Rangabali Government College
- Hazi Akkel Ali Howlader College
- Dr. Yakub Sharif College
- Aziz Ahmed College

Schools

- Kalaia Secondary School
- Abdul High Bidda Nakeiton
- Patuakhali Government Jubilee High School
- Patuakhali Government Girls' High School
- Patuakhali Collectorate School and College
- Auliapur Adarsho Secondary School
- Latif Municipal Seminary
- Kanakdia Sir Salimullah High School & college
- Madhya Madanpura Secondary School

Polytechnic Institute

- Patuakhali Polytechnic Institute
- Begum Fazilatunnesa Polytechnic Institute
- Kanakdia Sir Salimullah High School

== Demographics ==
Historical population
Year	Pop.	±% p.a.
1974	937,006	—
1981	1,165,076	+3.16%
1991	1,273,872	+0.90%
2001	1,460,781	+1.38%
2011	1,535,854	+0.50%
2022	1,727,254	+1.07%

According to the 2022 Census of Bangladesh, Patuakhali District had 424,743 households and a population of 1,727,254 with an average 4.01 people per household. Among the population, 327,724 (18.97%) inhabitants were under 10 years of age. The population density was 719 people per km^{2}. Patuakhali District had a literacy rate (age 7 and over) of 76.70%, compared to the national average of 74.80%, and a sex ratio of 1048 females per 1000 males. Approximately, 18.62% of the population lived in urban areas. The ethnic population was 1,114.

=== Religion ===
Religions in Patuakhali District (2022)
Religion	Percent
Islam	93.63%
Hinduism	6.23%
Other or not stated	0.14%

Religion in present-day Patuakhali district
Religion	1941 (Note: Patuakhali subdivision of Bakerganj district excluding the thanas Betagi, Barguna and Amtali)		1981		1991		2001		2011		2022	
Religion	Pop.	%	Pop.	%	Pop.	%	Pop.	%	Pop.	%	Pop.	%
Islam	446,108	82.93%	1,053,255	90.40%	1,164,985	91.45%	1,350,968	92.48%	1,428,601	93.02%	1,617,155	93.63%
Hinduism	82,991	15.43%	109,242	9.38%	106,819	8.39%	107,893	7.38%	105,496	6.87%	107,553	6.23%
Others (Note: Including Jainism, Christianity, Buddhism, Zoroastrianism, Judaism, Ad-Dharmis, or not stated)	8,806	1.64%	2,579	0.22%	2,068	0.16%	1,920	0.14%	1,757	0.11%	2,546	0.14%
Total Population	537,905	100%	1,165,076	100%	1,273,872	100%	1,460,781	100%	1,535,854	100%	1,727,254	100%

The district is overwhelmingly Muslim with a small minority of Hindus. There is also a dwindling community of Rakhine Buddhists settled in Kalapara Upazila. Similar to other districts in the Barisal division, the minority Hindu, Buddhist and Christian populations have seen a decline in absolute numbers in the 2001-2011 period. The district has 4765 mosques, 422 temples, and 13 churches.

== Patuakhali city ==
The city of Patuakhali is situated beside two local rivers: Laukathi River and Lohalia River. During high tides some of the regions of Patuakhali get flooded. The Bay of Bengal is not far from the region.

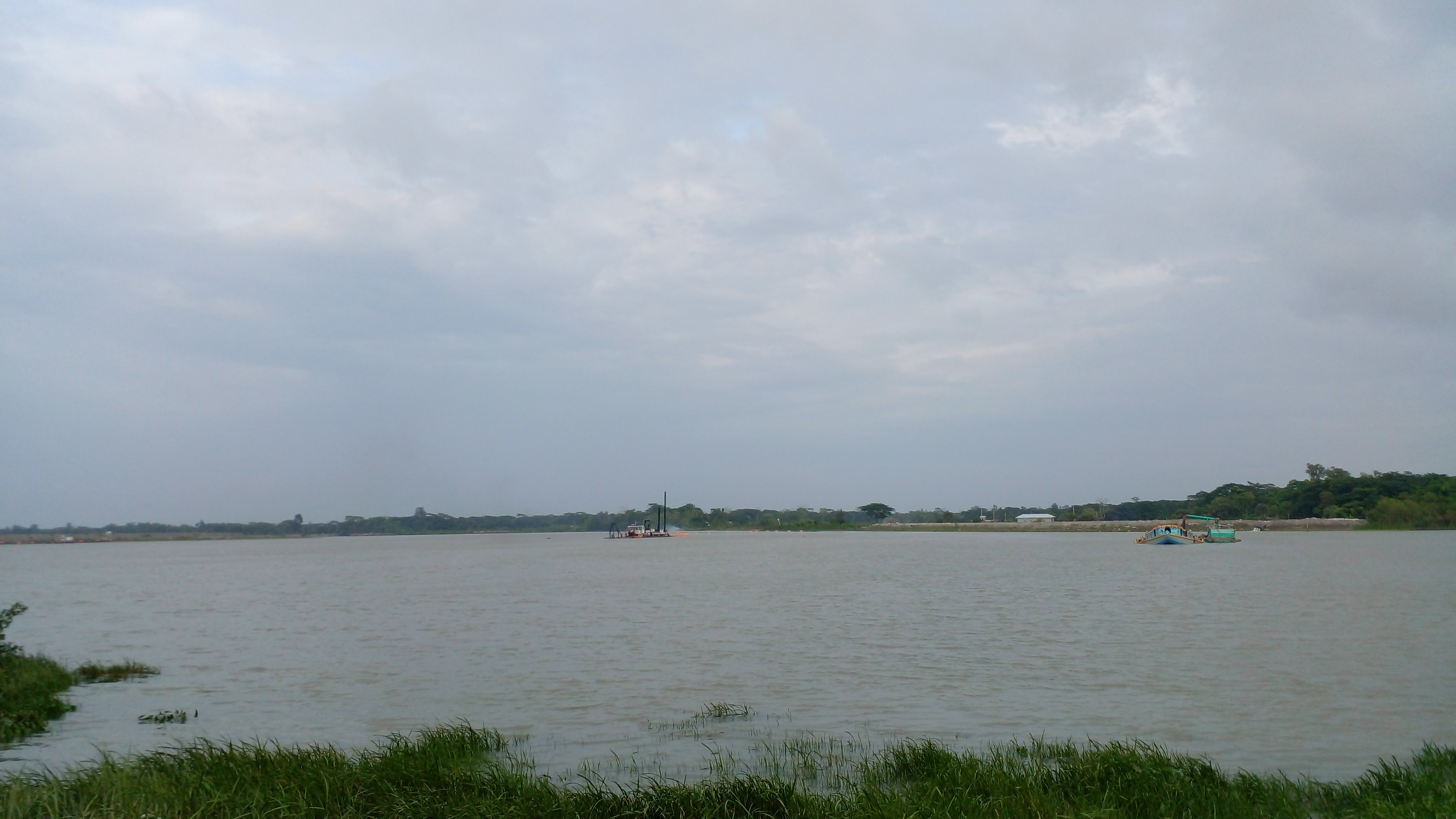
Lohalia River in Rainy Season

At the entrance of the city there is a bridge that connects Barisal (the divisional city) with Patuakhali and Kuakata Beach.

As Patuakhali is a coastal area, it is affected almost every year by natural disasters like cyclones, floods and tornadoes. To help the disaster-affected people, many NGO's are active in the area. They play a vital role in developing the life style of poor people.

Bura Ghuranga river view from the bank of Bura Ghuranga river in beside the Gazi Bhari, East Auliapur, Ronghopaldi, Arojbegi, Dhasmina.

== Port of Payra ==
Port of Payra is the third sea port of Bangladesh (after Chittagong and Mongla).

== Notable people ==
- A. K. M. Fazlul Haque, colorectal surgeon
- Abdul Hady Talukdar, academic
- Sohag Gazi, cricketer of the Bangladesh national cricket team
- KM Nurul Huda, chief election commissioner of Bangladesh
- Faiz Ahmed, senior secretary, member of Public Service Commission
- Nurul Haq Nur, joint-convenor of Bangladesh Sadharan Chhatra Adhikar Sangrakshan Parishad and vice-president, Dhaka University Central Students' Union
- Ratan Lal Chakraborty, historian
- Satin Sen, Indian independence movement activist

== See also ==
- Districts of Bangladesh
- Divisions of Bangladesh
- Upazila
- Administrative geography of Bangladesh
