= Mukta Bangla =

Mukta Bangla (Bengali: মুক্ত বাংলা, transl. Free or independent Bengal) may refer to:

- Mukta Bangla (Islamic University), a sculpture installed in Islamic University, Bangladesh.
- Mukta Bangla (PSTU), a sculpture installed in Patuakhali Science and Technology University.
