= Mukta Bangla (PSTU) =

- Joy Bangla (30 March 2011 – 25 March 2025)
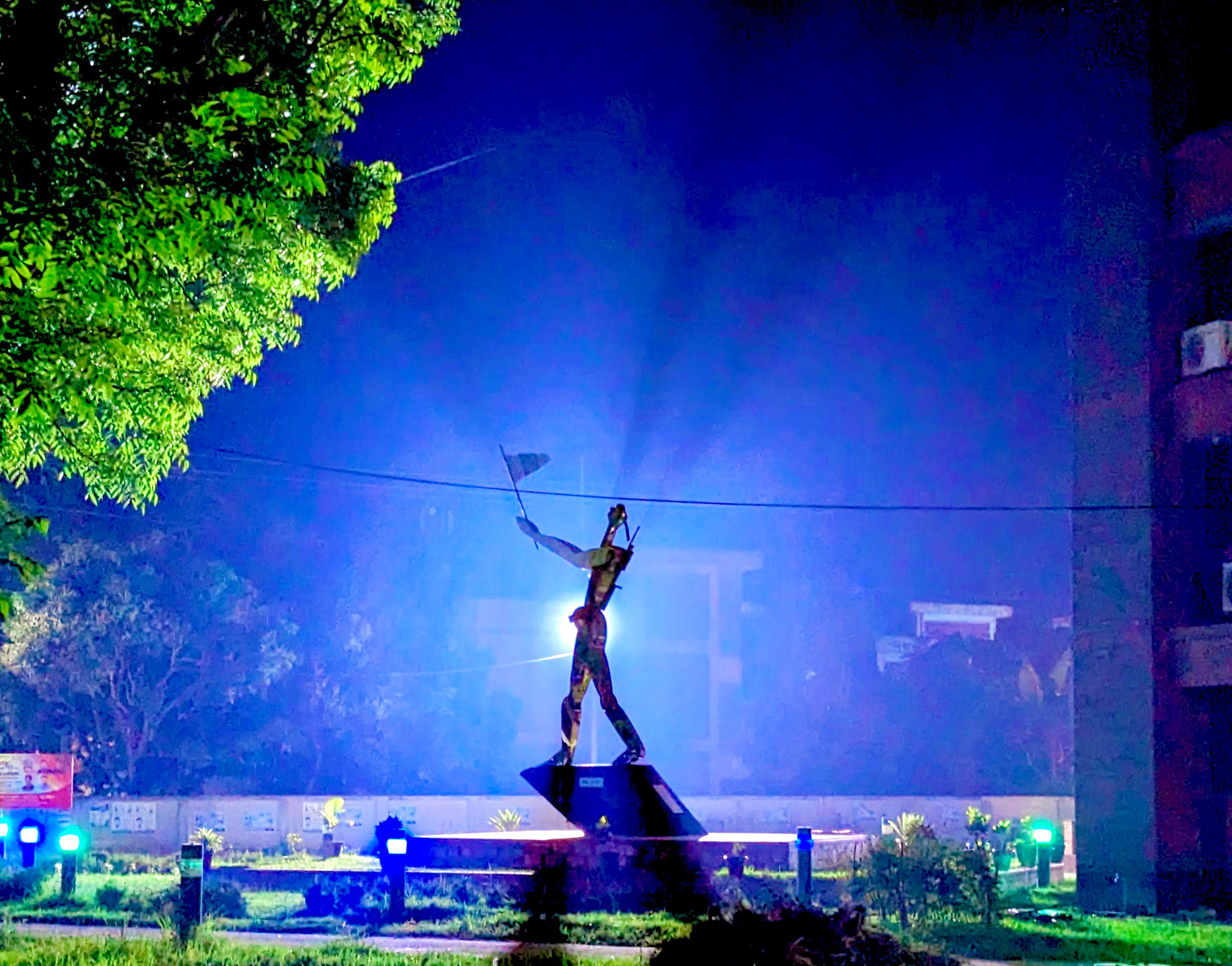
- 'Mukt Bangla' in front of the Administration Building
- Artist: Hamiduzzaman Khan
- Year: 30 March 2011
- Medium: Stainless steel
- Subject: Bangladesh Liberation War
- Location: Dumki Upazila; 22.464069°N 90.3823381°E
- Owner: Patuakhali Science and Technology University

Mukta Bangla (Bengali: মুক্ত বাংলা, transl. Free or independent Bengal) is a commemorative sculpture dedicated to the Bangladesh Liberation War. The sculpture, designed by Hamiduzzaman Khan, depicts a symbolic freedom fighter and is made of stainless steel. It is installed at the main square in front of the administration building on the 'Bijoy-24' road of Patuakhali Science and Technology University. It was officially inaugurated on 30 March 2011. Its original name was taken from the slogan Joy Bangla. On 25 March 2025, the sculpture's name was changed from 'Joy Bangla' to 'Mukta Bangla'.

== Construction ==
As there was no significant Liberation War memorial in Patuakhali District, the university initiated the construction of a sculpture in 2011. The project cost 800,000 taka. The University Grants Commission provided 600,000 taka, and Janata Bank contributed 200,000 taka. The main statue was made of stainless steel. Its base is surrounded by two tiers of red ceramic brick walls. Black granite was used to cover the pedestal.

== Description ==
Mukta Bangla is a 22-foot-tall sculpture surrounded by two brick layers at the base. The first tier measures 40 feet in length and 30 feet in width, bordered with 15-inch ceramic bricks. Above it lies the second tier, measuring 22 feet in length and 16 feet in width, also encircled with the same brick. On this pedestal stands the statue of a symbolic freedom fighter. He carries a rifle slung over his shoulder, wears a gamcha around his head, and raises the national flag used during the Bangladesh Liberation War with both hands.
