= Abdul Muyeed Chowdhury =

Bangladeshi politician

- আব্দুল মুঈদ চৌধুরী
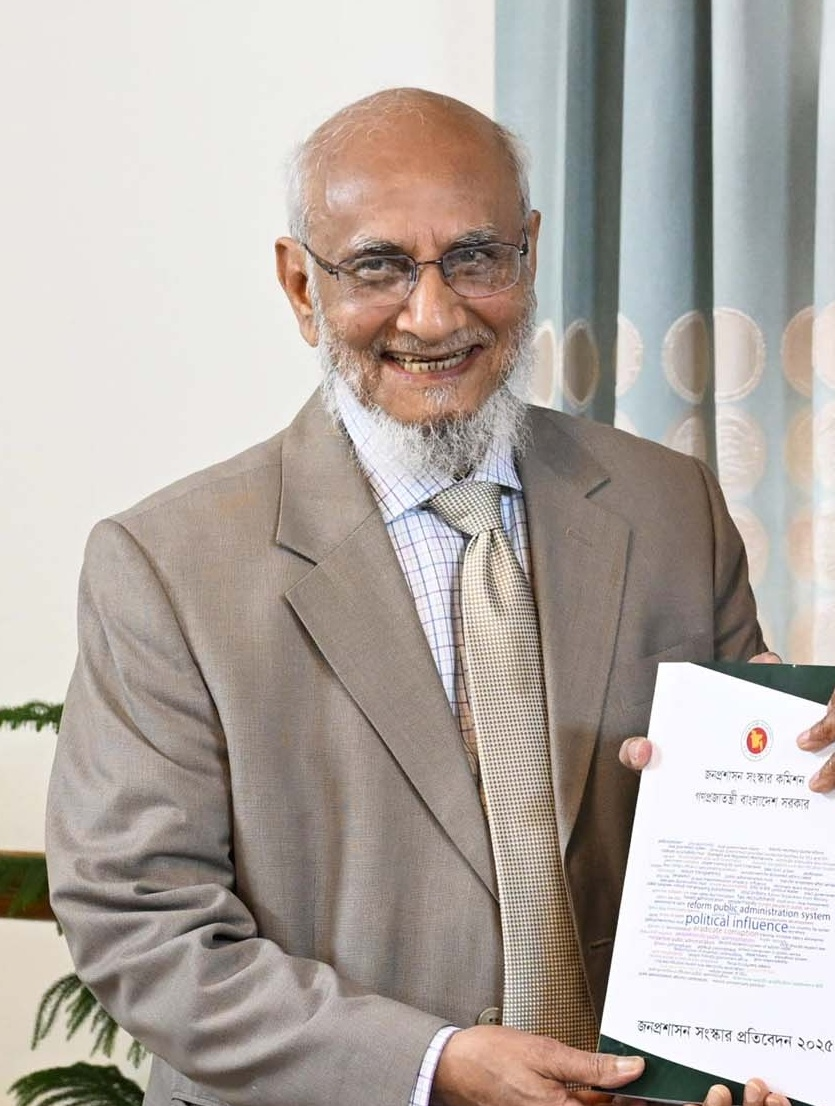
- Muyeed in 2025

Chairman of Biman Bangladesh Airlines
- In office 20 August 2024 – 26 August 2025
- Prime Minister: Muhammad Yunus (Chief adviser)
- Preceded by: Mostafa Kamal Uddin
- Succeeded by: Sheikh Bashir Uddin

Personal details
- Born: Faridpur District, East Pakistan
- Education: University of Dhaka; University of Tennessee
- Profession: Civil Servant

Abdul Muyeed Chowdhury is a retired Bangladeshi career bureaucrat and former adviser, with the rank of minister, of the Latifur Rahman caretaker government. He was the chairman of Biman Bangladesh Airlines.

== Early life ==
Chowdhury completed his bachelor's degree and master's in history from Dhaka University in 1964 and 1965 respectively. He went to the University of Tennessee on a Fulbright Program scholarship.

== Career ==
Chowdhury joined the Civil Service of Pakistan in 1967. From 1975 to 1978, he was the deputy commissioner of Faridpur District. From 1991 to 1994, he was the CEO and managing director of Biman Bangladesh Airlines. From 1994 to 2000, he served as secretary in a number of ministries.

Chowdhury was the head of the Internal Resources Division and later the National Board of Revenue. In 2000, he served as an adviser in Latifur Rahman's cabinet with the rank of a minister. He worked as the executive director of BRAC from 2000 to 2006.

Chowdhury served as the vice president of Bangladesh Olympic Association. He is the founder and CEO of Tiger Tours Limited. He is an independent director of ACI Limited, Pioneer Insurance Company Ltd, and Summit Alliance Port Limited. He is the director of MJLBL.

On 20 August 2024, Chowdhury was appointed chairman of Bangladesh Biman Airlines.
