= Summit Alliance Port Limited =

Bangladeshi company

- Company type: Public limited company
- Industry: Off-Dock
- Founded: 2003
- Headquarters: 63 Pragati Sarani, Baridhara, Dhaka - 1212, Bangladesh
- Area served: Bangladesh, India
- Key people: Muhammed Aziz Khan (Chairman); Jowher Rizvi (Managing Director)
- Services: Off-Dock service Inland Water Container Terminal Operator
- Revenue: ▲US$18.91 million (2022)
- Net income: ▲US$3.02 million (2022)
- Total assets: ▲US$131.26 million (2022)
- Number of employees: 1,389
- Parent: Summit Group and Alliance Holdings Limited
- Website: www.saplbd.com

Summit Alliance Port Limited is a Bangladeshi company that provides off-dock services. In addition to its facilities in the Chittagong Port and a river terminal situated on the bank of the Dhaleshwari River in Munshiganj District, it also operates and manages three river terminals in India. The principal activities of the company are inland container depot with facilities for empty container storage and container freight station having provision for handling both Import and export cargo.

Established as a joint venture between Summit Group and Alliance Holdings Limited, the company is the dominant market leader in the competitive off–dock sector, handling over 25% of total containerized export cargo and 15% of import cargo of Bangladesh's entire containerized volume. It is a publicly traded company on both the Dhaka and Chittagong Stock Exchanges.

== History ==
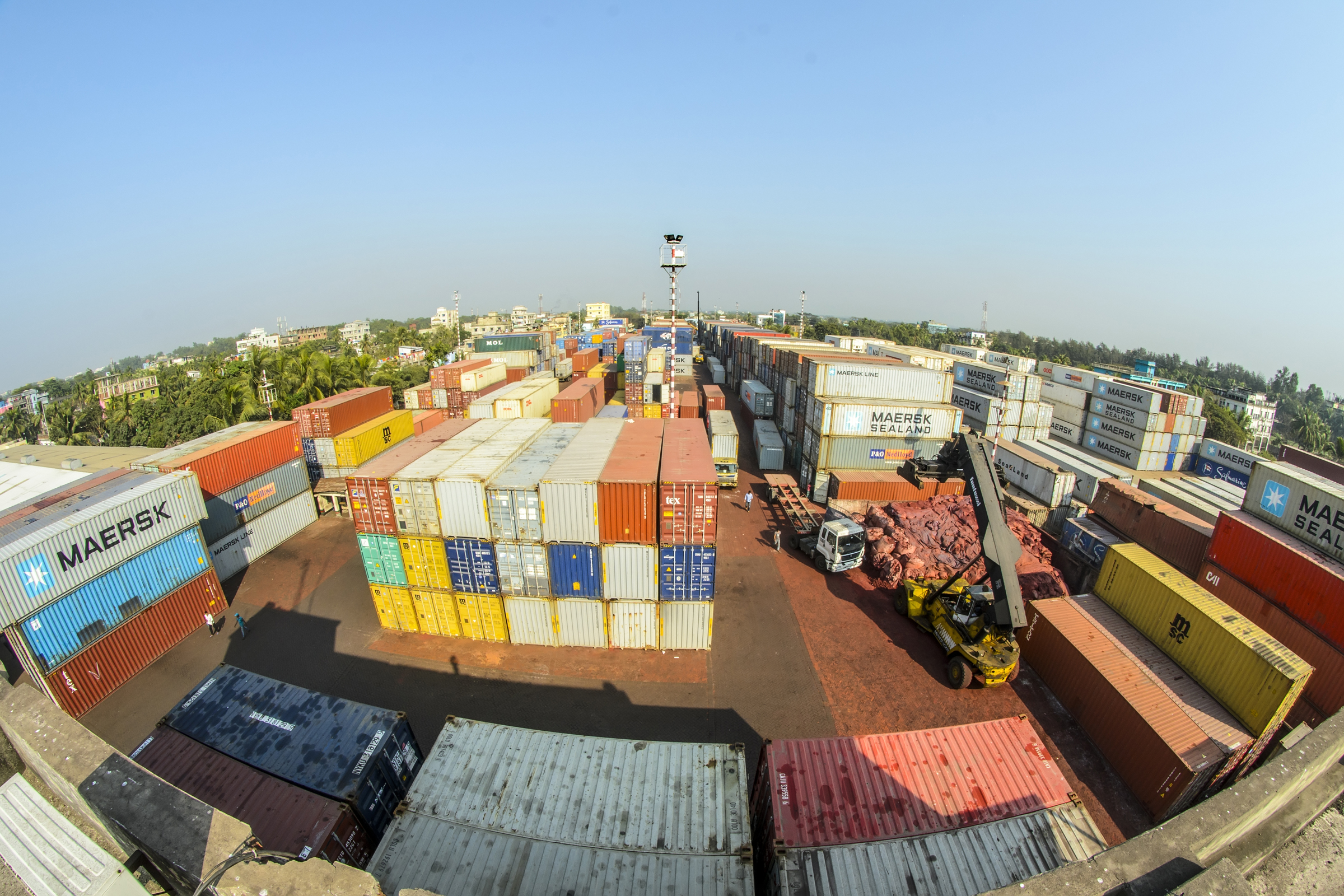
Off-Dock facility of Summit Alliance Port Limited at Patenga, Chittagong.

An initiative of Summit Group and Alliance Holdings Limited, Summit Alliance Port Limited was initially incorporated as a private company under the Companies Act, 1994 of Bangladesh on December 6, 2003, and converted to a Public Limited Company on March 6, 2008. SAPL started out initially by utilizing over 30 acres of Customs Bonded Area at the Chittagong Port.

Summit Alliance Port Limited took over the management of three Indian river terminals in November, 2018. The Inland Waterways Authority of India in a Public-Private Partnership, handed over the management of the terminals to Summit Alliance Port East Gateway (India) Private Limited, a subsidiary of Summit Alliance Port Limited. The ports are Garden Reach Terminal in Kolkata and Kalughat Terminals in Patna.

== Overview ==
The services of the company include inland container depot comprising transportation and storage of empty containers and redelivery of the containers. Customized services, such as container condition survey, its repair, maintenance and fumigation. It has container freight station activities related to export as well as import cargo handling under customs clearance. The company also offers vessels for transportation of containers to and from Chittagong Port.
