= Kazi Rafiqul Islam (academic) =

Bangladeshi pharmacologist

Vice-Chancellor

Patuakhali Science and Technology University
- In office 26 September 2024 – 8 June 2026
- Preceded by: Swadesh Chandra Samanta
- Succeeded by: Dr. S. M. Hemayet Jahan

Personal details
- Born: 31 December 1973 (age 52) Backergunge District, Bangladesh
- Education: Government Brojomohun College; Bangladesh Agricultural University; Kagawa University, Japan
- Occupation: Professor, University administrator

Kazi Rafiqul Islam (born 31 December 1973) is a Bangladeshi pharmacologist. He is a professor in the Department of Pharmacology at the Bangladesh Agricultural University and the former Vice-Chancellor of Patuakhali Science and Technology University.

== Early life and education ==
Rafiqul Islam was born on 31 December 1973 in Barishal Sadar Upazila, Barishal District. His father’s name is Kazi Abdul Khalek and his mother’s name is Kazi Rabeya Begum. He completed his SSC in 1988 from Barishal Baptist Mission Boys’ High School and his HSC in 1990 from Government Brojomohun College, Barisal. He obtained a Doctor of Veterinary Medicine (DVM) degree in 1994 and an MS in Pharmacology in 1998 from the Faculty of Veterinary Science, Bangladesh Agricultural University. In 2011, he earned his PhD from Kagawa University, Japan, and later completed multiple post-doctoral research programs.

== Career ==
Rafiqul Islam joined the Department of Pharmacology at Bangladesh Agricultural University in 2002 as a lecturer. He was promoted to assistant professor in 2004, associate professor in 2011, and professor in 2016. On 25 September 2024, he was appointed as the Vice-Chancellor of Patuakhali Science and Technology University and formally assumed office on 26 September 2024.

== Publications ==
He has published more than one hundred research papers in national and international journals.

== Awards ==
- President’s Award (2011), Kagawa University, Japan.
