= Narail Express Foundation =

Charitable foundation in Bangladesh founded by Mashrafe Mortaza

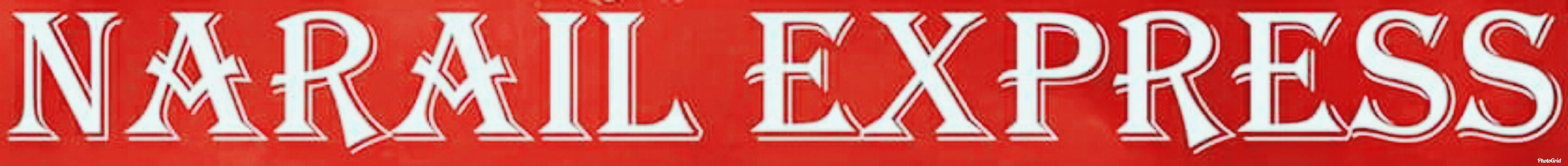
- Founded: 4 September 2017
- Founder: Mashrafe Mortaza
- Type: Education and healthcare for underprivileged
- Purpose: Underprivileged children and youth
- Location: Narail
- Coordinates: 23.1736°N 89.5089°E
- Region served: Bangladesh
- Services: Education, employment, medical treatment, arts and culture, sports and human rights.
- Method: Direct training, funding medical treatment, supplies for the differently-abled
- Official language: Bengali
- Owner: Mashrafe Mortaza

The Narail Express Foundation (Bengali: নড়াইল এক্সপ্রেস ফাউন্ডেশন) is a non-profit charity based in Narail that provides education, healthcare, and other social services for the people who live in the Narail district of Bangladesh. It was co-founded by Bangladeshi Politician and Cricketer Mashrafe Mortaza, along with Tarikul Islam Anik (Founder General Secretary) in 2017.

== Partners ==
From December 2017, the Narail Express Foundation logo is used on the bottles of Pran Drinking Water. Pran provides financial support to the Foundation in return.

On 19 April 2018, IPDC Finance, a private financial institution, signed an agreement with Narail Express Foundation for providing all the training facilities of the sport for the talented players from Narail.

In April 2018, an agreement was signed with the clinic and the diagnosis center "Prescription Point" to advance Narail's medical care. According to the agreement, all types of health services will be available at Banani and Badda branches of 'Prescription Point' with a discount of fifty percent.

In May 2018, an agreement was signed with Thyrocare Technologies Limited so that the people of Narail will be able to get more than 400 blood tests at the highest discount, including cancer detection.

On 14 May 2019 Atish Dipankar University of Science and Technology signed an agreement with Narail Express Foundation, which will allow at least twenty students every year to study for 100% free scholarships at the university for the students of Narail for more than next ten years.

On 19 May 2019, Narail Express Foundation has taken initiative to tackle unemployment problem. The plan is to create employment opportunities by looking for young entrepreneurs and providing them with appropriate training and overall support. An agreement was recently signed between the Narail Express Foundation and Sahin's Helpline to implement it. Sahin's helpline will work primarily on how to develop youth skills through training.

== Charity events ==
Narail Express Foundation organized the "Concert for the Helpless" to help people who are disadvantaged in Narail. Some of the country's first-class artists come to the event to sing. The proceeds from this concert will be spent on the welfare of the disadvantaged people.

== Awards ==
The Narail Express Foundation continues to play a role in achieving the UN's sustainable development goals in social innovation and digital skills. It has been selected from 26 foundations across the country.

Year	Award	Category	Result	Refs
2019	Bangladesh Digital Social Innovation Summit	Best Social Foundation	Won	

== Social activities ==
- Narail Express Foundation has installed closed circuit cameras around two cities to improve the security of Narail's people.
- Under the management of the "Narail Express Foundation", talented soccer, cricket, and volleyball players will be selected from the remote areas. And for the final phase, twenty five players from each department will be provided free training throughout the year. The 'Narail Express Foundation' will be participating in the Second Division Football and Cricket Games next year. These players will participate in national level play after proper training. This training will also create an opportunity for these players to be employed in public and private organizations.
- Narail Express Foundation distributes free rice seeds among one thousand farmers. The Foundation has been contributing to the development of the society at various times. This time, the seeds of advanced varieties were distributed with the initiative of the Foundation and in collaboration with the International Rice Research Institute.
- Narail Express Foundation gets ambulance gifted by Rangpur Riders, underprivileged people will be able use this ambulance in Narail District.
- Narail Express Foundation and Badar Uddin-Hinguljan Smiriti Library in Magura has jointly arranged a day-long eye camp at Sharif Abdul Hakim Diabetic Hospital in Narail.
- Narail Express Foundation organized financial support for the poor patients with 'the Rugi Welfare Society', at Abdul Hamik Diabetic Hospital, Mahisakhola.
- 1500 blankets have been distributed among the poor, cold effected people by the initiative of Narail Express Foundation.
- Narail Express Foundation has provided solar lights for nearly 100 families in all areas where electricity has not yet been reached.
- 5 lakh, 10 hajar BDT was distributed to forty-three poor and helpless people under the initiative of Narail Express Foundation.
- Under the program 'Bangladesh Food Aid Ramadan 2019' funded by the Ichha Foundation and the Narail Express Foundation, with the support of the Al-Imdad Foundation, various food items worth 10 lakh BDT have been provided among the 400 poor families of Narail.
