= Hamiduzzaman Sculpture Park =

Sculpture park in Gazipur, Bangladesh

- হামিদুজ্জামান ভাস্কর্য পার্ক
- Location within Bangladesh
- Type: Open-air sculpture park
- Location: Kaliakair Upazila, Gazipur District
- Nearest city: Gazipur
- Coordinates: 23.9910°N 90.3389°E
- Area: 2 acres (0.81 ha)
- Operator: Summit Gazipur 464 Megawatt Power Plant
- Status: Not yet opened for the public

Hamiduzzaman Sculpture Park is a sculpture park located in Gazipur, Bangladesh. Stretching over 2 acres of land, the park is within a power plant of Summit Group. The park displays sculptures, artworks and mural created by Bangladeshi sculptor Hamiduzzaman Khan. The park is the first open-air sculpture park in Bangladesh and it contains the longest mural of the country with a length of 340-feet. Sculptures and artworks at the park have been created on the overarching theme of fusion between art and industry. The artistic style of the sculptures at the park characterizes modernistic and contemporary genres.

== History ==
The construction of the sculpture park began immediately after the completion of the Summit Gazipur 464 MW Power Plant. With the support and patronization of Chairman of Summit Group Muhammed Aziz Khan, sculptor Hamiduzzaman Khan began working on the sculptures for the park. As a tribute to the life and five-decades-long career of Hamiduzzaman Khan, the park has been named after him. The park is located in natural environment within the power plant premises, stretching over 2 acres of land. It was officially inaugurated in February, 2019.

== Artworks and sculptures ==
Hamiduzzaman Sculpture Park contains around twenty sculptures. The overarching theme of the sculptures is fusion between art and industry. The park features the longest mural in the country with a length of 340-feet. It is titled Srom O Srishti (Industry And Creation). The mural highlights the importance of electricity on human civilization. It is constructed on a white longitudinal background with various geometric shapes including circles, half-circles and curvilinear lines. It incorporates forms based on mechanical and industrial equipment, i.e., turbine, wheel. The mural is made of stainless steel, marble and iron.

Some of the sculptures are placed on concrete surface, while some are placed upon grass with the grass keeping intact. The themes of the sculptures include Bangladesh War of Liberation, primitive language and vocabulary, birds, folk-culture, human face and history of Bangladesh. The artistic style of the sculptures reflects contemporary Bangladeshi modernity. They are predominantly abstract and semi-abstract. The sculptures contain both geometric and organic forms. The sculptor used iron, stone, steel, granite, cement and steel wire in these sculptural constructions.

One of the sculptures is based on the theme of Bangladesh War of Liberation, titled Remembrance ’71. It portrays imagery of a rickshaw with the martyred figures of the puller and passenger. A sculpture titled Guest Of The Night shows a human figure in act of studying under a street-light. Another sculpture, titled Life And Lifeless, shows a wheel and an abstract of a bird, highlighting the contrast between vitality and inertia. The park displays artworks and installation works apart from sculptures. One of the installation works, titled Peace Bird, shows an abstract form of a bird, installed on an electricity pole. Other installation works include The Seed and Wheel Of Civilization. A mural, titled Signag, highlights primitive language and vocabulary. It is made of metal and installed on a wall of a building within the park. The building is planned to be an art gallery and it will display artworks by the artist.

== Gallery ==
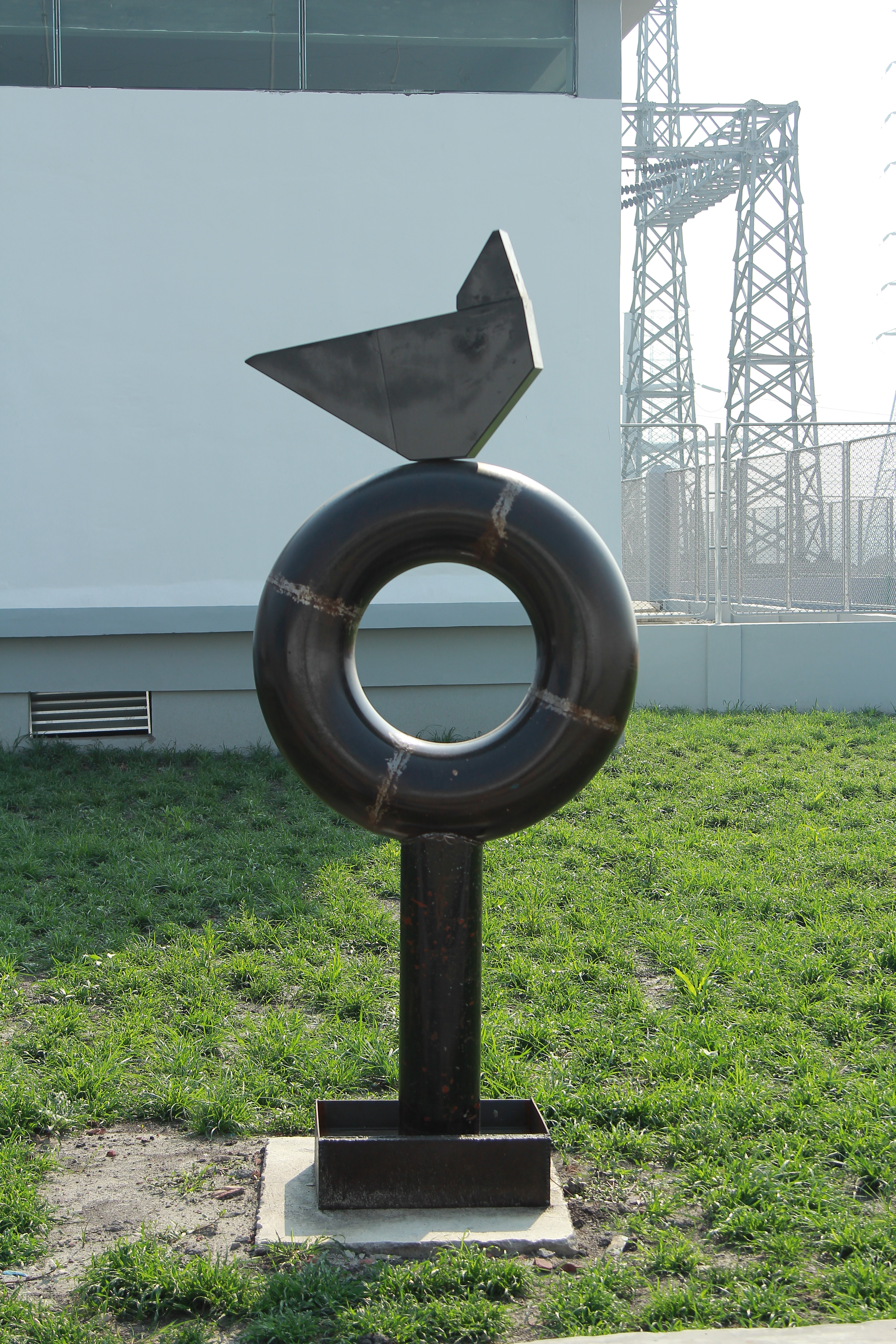
Life and Lifeless

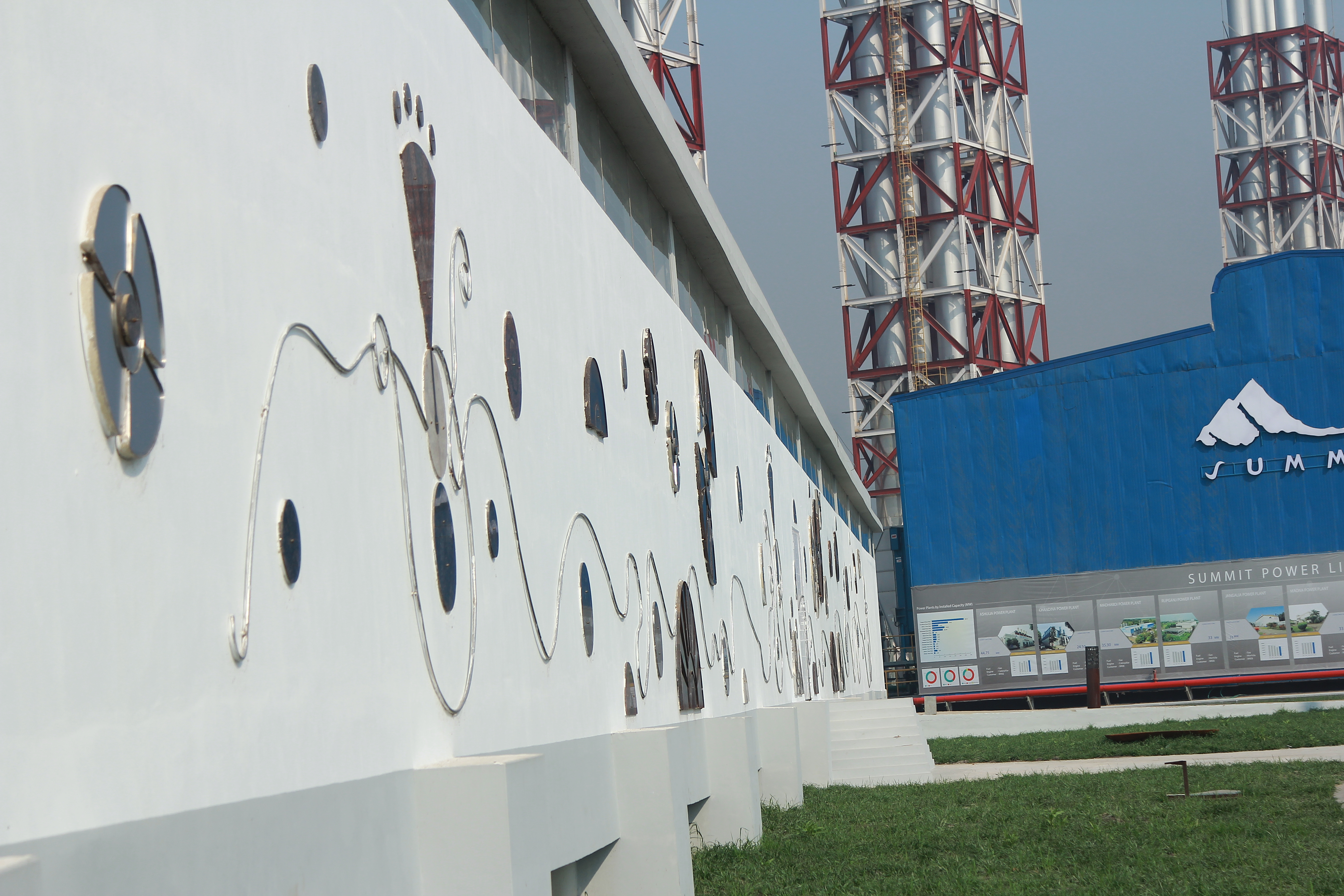
Srom O Srishti (Industry and Creation)
