= Abul Khayer Hiru =

Abul Khayer Hiru is a Bangladeshi civil servant and well-known stock market investor. He has been found guilty of stock market manipulation and finned multiple times. He manages a 20 billion BDT fund in the stock market. His business partner is cricketer and Awami League member of parliament Shakib Al Hasan.

== Career ==
Hiru joined the 31st batch of the Bangladesh Civil Service. He is a deputy registrar of the Department of Cooperatives. He made his name and fortune investing public funds from the Department of Cooperative in the stock market.

In June 2022, Hiru was finned 20 million BDT for manipulating the prices of shares of Asia Insurance Limited, Bangladesh National Insurance Company Limited, and Green Delta Insurance. Bangladesh Securities and Exchange Commission found Hiru and his associates guilty of manipulating the share prices of One Bank Limited and BDCOM Online September 2022. It fined them 355 thousand for 485 million BDT market manipulation. The Daily Star described the fine as a "slap on the wrist". He was also found involved with manipulating the share prices of United Commercial Bank in 2021. In 2022, the commission began an investigation against Hiru over the share prices of Safko Spinning Mills. The regulator also found the involvement of DIT Co-operative Limited, owned by his brother-in-law Kazi Farid Hasan. He and Shakib Al Hasan were found involved with manipulating the prices of shares of IPDC Finance Limited.

In 2023, he was fined 52.5 million BDT for manipulating the stocks of NRBC Bank and Fortune Shoes Limited. In February 2024, Hiru was fined for manipulating the price of shares of Genex Infosys. He is also involved with Fortune Barishal.

Bangladesh Securities and Exchange Commission found Hiru and his associates were involved in price manipulation of the shares of Sonali Paper and Board Mills Limited, NRBC Bank, Delta Life Insurance Company Limited, and Fortune Shoes Limited in December 2024. It fined them 1.34 billion BDT. His business partner and cricketer, Shakib Al Hasan's company Monarch Mart was fined 100 thousand BDT. The commission was reformed after the fall of the Sheikh Hasina led Awami League government. Hiru was protected by the former chairman of the commission Shibli Rubayat Ul Islam. The commission filed four cases against him over unpaid fines. Also fined were his wife Kazi Sadia Hasan and his father Abul Kalam Matber. His sister, brothers and brothers-in-law were also fined.
