= Sreerampur Zamindar Bari =

General information
- Type: Residence
- Architectural style: Mughal
- Location: Sreerampur, Dumki Upazila, Patuakhali District, Bangladesh
- Opened: 19th century
- Closed: 19th century
- Owner: Shibl Khan Mia

Technical details
- Material: Brick, lime-surki and rod

Sreerampur Zamindar Bari is a historic zamindar residence from the Mughal period, located in Sreerampur village of Dumki Upazila, Patuakhali District, Bangladesh. Locally, it is known as Mia Bari.

== History ==
The zamindari in Sreerampur village of Dumki Upazila, Patuakhali District, was established during the reign of Murshid Quli Khan, the first Nawab of Bengal under the Mughal Empire. The founder of this zamindar house was Shibl Khan, who was originally a Hindu. His former name was Shri Shib Prasad Mukhopadhyay. He and his brother, Shri Bhav Prasad Mukhopadhyay, served as high-ranking officials under Nawab Murshid Quli Khan. After converting to Islam, Shib Prasad took the name Shibl Khan. The Nawab, pleased with this, granted him land and the title of Mia. The land granted to him stretched as far as one could go in a day by boat. Later, Shibl Khan’s son Kale Khan expanded the zamindari by adding more villages, bringing the total to 56.

== Present condition ==
At the entrance of the zamindar house, there are several gates. Inside are the residential palaces built by the zamindars. There is also a dark well. However, most of these structures are now on the verge of collapse. Within the estate stands a Mughal-style mosque, along with the twin graves of Zamindar Kale Khan Mia and his wife Zulekha. Next to the zamindar house is a Mughal-era bridge built over a canal. In addition, some Mughal-period structures still remain in the surrounding zamindari area.
