= IPDC Finance =

IPDC Finance PLC.
- Native name: আইপিডিসি ফাইন্যান্স পিএলসি.
- Company type: Public Limited Company
- Industry: Financial services
- Founded: 1981; 45 years ago
- Founder: The Government of the People's Republic of Bangladesh (GOB), The Aga Khan Fund for Economic Development (AKFED), International Finance Corporation (IFC), German Investment and Development Company (DEG), Commonwealth Development Corporation (CDC)
- Headquarters: Hosna Centre (4th floor), 106 Gulshan Avenue, Dhaka, Bangladesh
- Key people: Abdul Karim (Chairman); Mominul Islam (Managing Director & CEO)
- Products: Corporate finance, SME finance, Retail finance
- Website: ipdc.com

IPDC Finance PLC. (previously known as Industrial Promotion and Development Company of Bangladesh Limited) is a private sector financial institution of the country. IPDC Finance, established in 1981, is a public limited company and listed on both the Dhaka Stock Exchange and Chittagong Stock Exchange.

IPDC is the first private sector financial institution of the country. The company's products and services ranges from corporate finance and advisory services in corporate sector, middle market supply chain finance in SME sector to retail wealth management and retail finances in retail sector.

Rizwan Dawood Shams is the managing director of IPDC Finance.

== History ==
Industrial Promotion and Development Company of Bangladesh Limited was established in 1981. Alliance Holdings Limited was a sponsor shareholder. The original shareholders included Aga Khan Fund for Economic Development, BRAC, Commonwealth Development Corporation, Government of Bangladesh, German Investment Corporation, and International Finance Corporation.

Industrial Promotion and Development Company of Bangladesh Limited issued its IPO in 2006.

Ayub Quadri, chairman of IPDC Finance, launched the first asset-backed securitised bond in Bangladesh on 9 November 2004 with M Saifur Rahman, Minister of Finance.

Salehuddin Ahmed, governor of Bangladesh Bank, expressed concern over 22.86 percent of Industrial Promotion and Development Company of Bangladesh Limited's outstanding loans were classified in August 2007. Masih-ul-Huq Chowdhury was appointed managing director of Industrial Promotion and Development Company of Bangladesh Limited in 2008.

Md Mominul Islam was appointed managing director in 2012, he had been serving as head of operations since 2006.

In December 2016, Industrial Promotion and Development Company of Bangladesh rebranded itself as IPDC Finance under CEO Mominul Islam. It partnered with Narail Express Foundation of Mashrafe Mortaza for a three year period in 2018. Md. Abdul Karim, former chairman of the National Board of Revenue, was appointed chairman of IPDC Finance in 2020.

In 2023, IPDC Finance had 70.57 billion BDT in advance portfolio, lease, and loans. It ranked number one on the 2022, 2023 and 2024 Bangladesh Bank's Sustainability Rating for finance companies. Kazi Mahmood Sattar was appointed chairman of IPDC Finance in 2022.

Mominul Islam resigned from the post of CEO and managing director of IPDC Finance in 2023. The company had seen a 70 percent reduction in profits that year. Rizwan Dawood Shams was appointed managing director of IPDC Finance. Ariful Islam, representing Ayesha Abed Foundation in the board of directors, was appointed chairman of IPDC Finance. Bangladesh Bank honored it for financing Biological Effluent Treatment Plant for the garments industry. It donated to the Prime Minister's Education Assistance Trust. An arrest warrant was issued against Arifa Parvin Zaman Moushumi, actress, for dishonoring a check to IPDC Finance.

Bangladesh Securities and Exchange Commission found investor Abul Khayer Hiru hiked up the price of the shares of IPDC Finance through market manipulation and cricketer Shakib Al Hasan was possibly involved.

== Management ==
=== Chief Executive Office ===
At the beginning of 2018, IPDC Finance has reappointed Mominul Islam as its managing director and CEO for the third term. Islam joined IPDC as head of operations in 2006. After working in different positions of the company, he took charge as managing director and CEO in 2011. He had also worked in American Express Bank and Standard Chartered Bank for more than seven years in different roles.

=== Board of directors ===
Kazi Mahmood Sattar is the chairman of the board of IPDC Finance Limited. Along with him, Mohammad Manzarul Mannan, Mir Khairul Alam, Sonia Bashir Kabir, Shah Md. Ahsan Habib, Sameer Ahmad, Tushar Bhowmik, Ariful Islam, Nahreen Rahman, and Mominul Islam are the members of the board of directors of IPDC Finance.
