= Dumki Upazila =

Dumki Upazila দুমকি
- Upazila
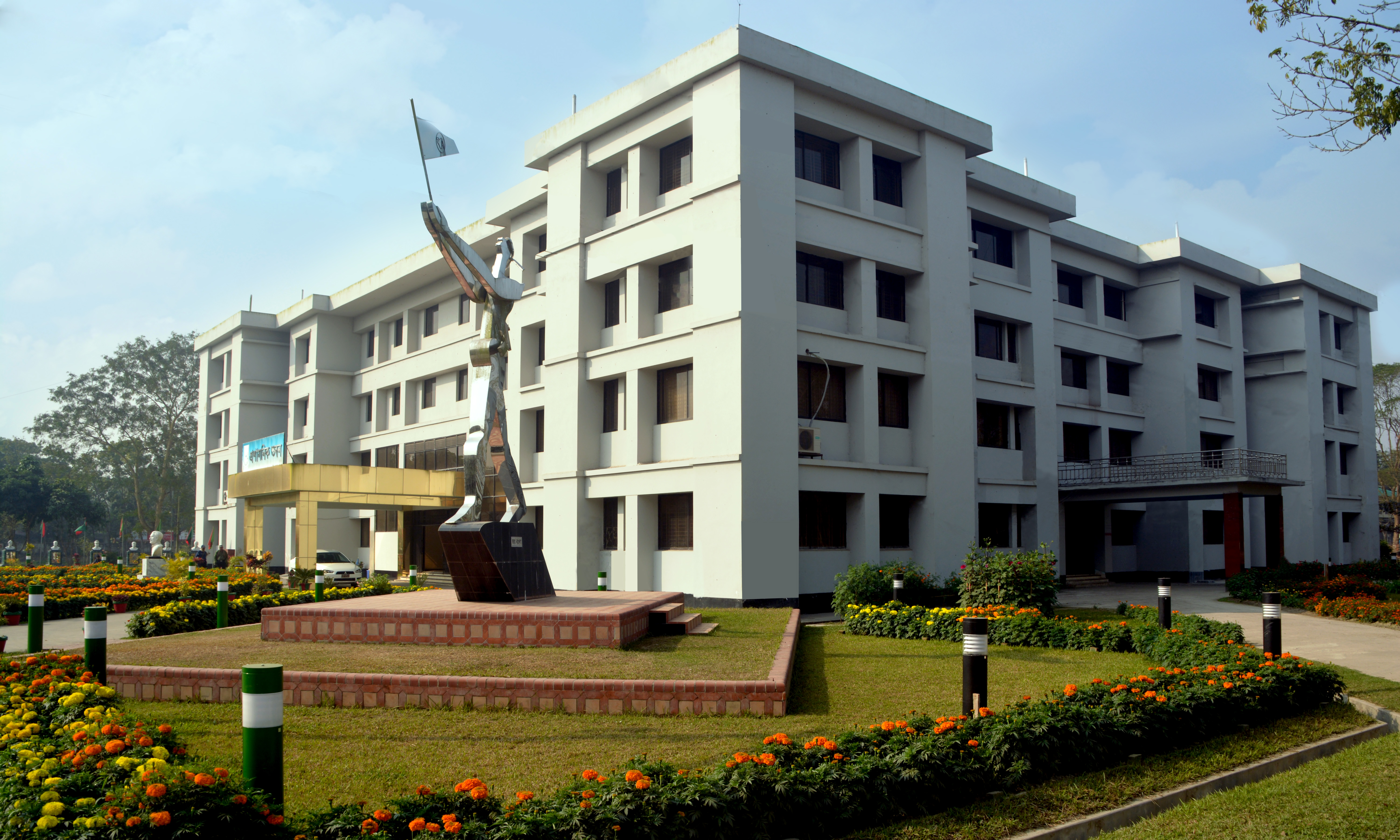
- Administration building of Patuakhali Science and Technology University

- Coordinates: 22°26′N 90°22′E
- Country: Bangladesh
- Division: Barisal
- District: Patuakhali

Area
  - Total: 92.41 km^{2} (35.68 sq mi)

Population (2022)
  - Total: 81,839
  - Density: 885.6/km^{2} (2,294/sq mi)
- Time zone: UTC+6 (BST)
- Postal code: 8602

Dumki Upazila mauza geocode map

Dumki (Bengali: দুমকি) is an upazila of Patuakhali District in the Division of Barisal, Bangladesh.

== Administration ==
Dumki Upazila is divided into five union parishads: Angaria, Labukhali, Muradia, Pangasia, and Sreerampur. The union parishads are subdivided into 21 mauzas and 24 villages.

== Educational institutions ==
- Patuakhali Science and Technology University

== Demographics ==
Religions in Dumki Upazila (2022)
Religion	Percent
Islam	92.26%
Hinduism	7.68%
Other or not stated	0.06%

According to the 2022 Bangladeshi census, Dumki Upazila had 19,289 households and a population of 81,839. 9.14% of the population were under 5 years of age. Dumki had a literacy rate (age 7 and over) of 81.28%: 83.79% for males and 79.00% for females, and a sex ratio of 92.68 males for every 100 females. 19,550 (23.89%) lived in urban areas.

According to the 2011 Census of Bangladesh, Dumki Upazila had 15,542 households and a population of 70,655. 16,570 (19.94%) were under 10 years of age. Dumki has a literacy rate (age 7 and over) of 66.4%, compared to the national average of 51.8%, and a sex ratio of 1090 females per 1000 males. 12,200 (17.27%) lived in urban areas.

== Tourist attraction ==
- Sreerampur Zamindar Bari
- Ghaseti Bibi Mosque

== See also ==
- Upazilas of Bangladesh
- Districts of Bangladesh
- Divisions of Bangladesh
