= S. M. Hemayet Jahan =

Professor Dr. S. M. Hemayet Jahan

Vice-Chancellor

Patuakhali Science and Technology University
- Incumbent
- Assumed office 9 June 2026
- Preceded by: Kazi Rafiqul Islam

Personal details
- Born: 28 October 1977 (age 48) Mirzaganj Upazila, Patuakhali District, Bangladesh
- Education: Jagannath University; Kyungpook National University, South Korea
- Occupation: Professor, University Administrator

S. M. Hemayet Jahan (born 28 October 1977) is a Bangladeshi entomologist. He is a professor in the Department of Entomology at Patuakhali Science and Technology University (PSTU) and the current Vice-Chancellor of the university. Prior to his appointment as Vice-Chancellor, he served as the Pro-Vice-Chancellor of PSTU.

== Early life and education ==
Hemayet Jahan was born on 28 October 1977 in Mirzaganj Upazila, Patuakhali District. His father is A. F. M. Shahjahan and his mother is Begum Latifa Jahan.

He passed the Secondary School Certificate (SSC) examination from Latif Municipal Seminary in 1992 and the Higher Secondary Certificate (HSC) examination from Patuakhali Government College in 1994. He obtained a B.Sc. (Honours) degree in Zoology in 1998 and an M.Sc. degree in Entomology in 1999 from Jagannath University. He earned a Ph.D. in Entomology from Kyungpook National University in South Korea in 2013.

== Career ==
Hemayet Jahan began his academic career as a Lecturer in the Department of Entomology at Patuakhali Science and Technology University in 2004. He was promoted to Assistant Professor in 2008, Associate Professor in 2012, and Professor in 2015. In 2024, he was promoted to Grade-1 Professor.

In addition to teaching and research, he has held several administrative positions, including Additional Registrar, member of the Academic Council, chairman of multiple academic departments including the Department of Entomology, and Pro-Vice-Chancellor of PSTU.

He has also been active in professional organizations. He served as Vice-President of the PSTU Teachers' Association and as a central committee member of the University Teachers Association of Bangladesh (UTAB), as well as General Secretary of the UTAB PSTU unit.

On 8 June 2026, he was appointed Vice-Chancellor of Patuakhali Science and Technology University, and formally assumed office on 9 June 2026.

== Research and publications ==
More than fifty of his research papers have been published in national and international academic journals.
