= Mohammed Aziz Khan (businessman) =

Bangladeshi Singaporean billionaire industrialist

Muhammed Aziz Khan
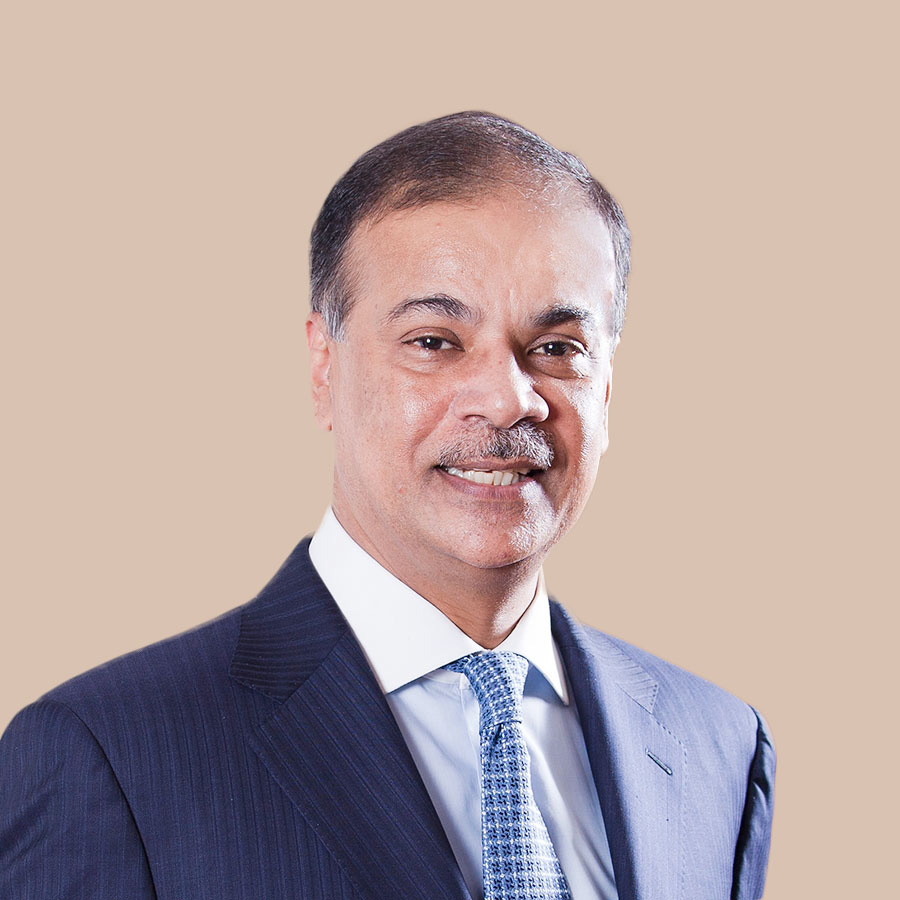
- Born: 1955 (age 70–71)
- Education: Institute of Business Administration, University of Dhaka (MBA)
- Occupation: Businessman
- Known for: Founder and chairman, Summit Group
- Spouse: Anjuman Aziz Khan
- Children: 3 daughters
- Relatives: Faruk Khan (brother)
- Website: summitpowerinternational.com/muhammed-aziz-khan

Muhammed Aziz Khan (born 1955) is a Singaporean billionaire industrialist, founder and chairman of the Summit Group, one of the largest conglomerates in Bangladesh, whose power projects generate nearly 20% of Bangladesh's electricity. Khan has led Summit Group from starting as Bangladesh's first private sector power producer to a diversified group with investments across power, energy trading, port, telecommunications, infrastructure, and real estate. He is the 42nd richest person in Singapore.

Khan has led Summit in building partnerships with multinationals such as GE, IFC and Wärtsilä while securing billions of dollars in financing for infrastructure projects within Bangladesh. Khan pledged to invest another $3 billion into Bangladesh's energy sector. He is listed as the richest Bangladeshi as of 2024 in the Forbes 2024 billionaire list.

== Early life ==
Khan is the son of an army officer. His first steps as a businessman were taken with a friend, whose father's death thrust him into the family import business. The 18-year-old Khan borrowed Tk 30,000 from his father to partner in the venture in 1973.

He received an MBA in 1980 from the Institute of Business Administration, University of Dhaka (IBA). He studied in Armanitola Government High School and Notredame College, Dhaka.

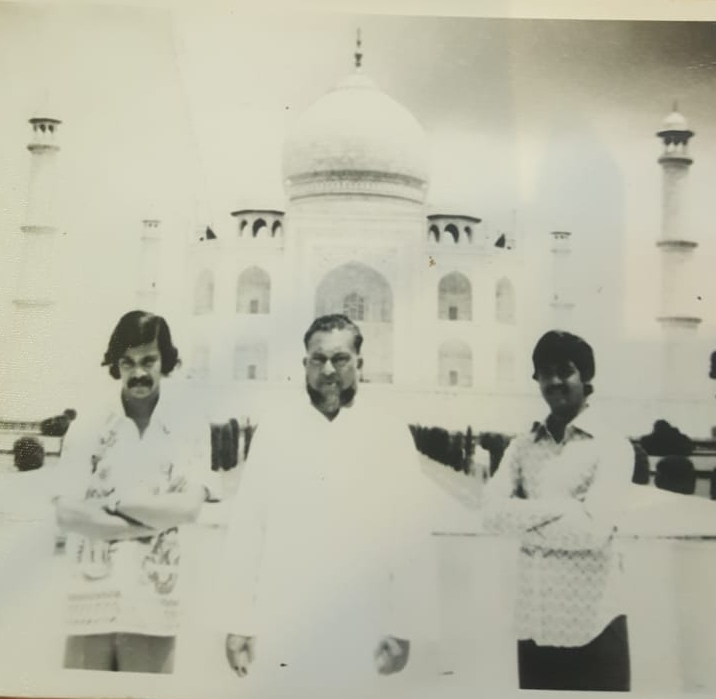
Khan with his first business partner Hazi Akbar Hossain

Khan began with trading chemicals in Chawk Bazar and Urdu Road in Old Dhaka. Later he expanded his business with support from renowned businessmen such as Anwar Hossain of Anwar Group and Din Mohammad of Phoenix Group.

Later, Khan began trading plastic. In 1988, Khan purchased his first home in Singapore after becoming a permanent resident.

== Career ==
Under his leadership, Summit Group set up the country's first independent power plant in 1998, Khulna Power Company Limited.

Summit Communications Ltd is the first company to lay a nationwide telecommunication transmission network, laying fibre optic to 70% of Bangladesh, and connecting Bangladesh to India and Myanmar through terrestrial fibre optics.

IPCO Ltd, a hospitality and real estate company, is building one five star and one three star hotels, a convention hall and 1000 shops beside the International Airport of Dhaka. These developments were later sold to United Group.

In 2011, Khan led Summit Group in establishing a joint venture with GE to build plants generating 327 megawatts of electricity for Bangladesh. This joint venture secured funding of $327 million, including $112 million from the World Bank.

In 2012, Khan led Summit Group in establishing a joint venture with China Energy Group, the largest government-owned Chinese company, to build various power projects, including a 341 megawatt power plant with a $220 million deal for China Energy Group to provide construction and engineering services.

In 2015, Khan was elected president of the Bangladesh Association of Publicly Listed Companies. He also led Summit Group in winning a deal to build Bangladesh's first high-tech business park, agreeing to invest $207 million to build part of the park across its 232-acre land in Kaliakor, Bangladesh.

In April 2016, Khan, his wife, daughter, brother and nephew were named in the Panama Papers as operating offshore companies, mostly in the British Virgin Islands using a Singapore address. Summit Group states that it has no business in any form in Panama, nor it has any link with the legal firm Mossack Fonseca, and that there has not been any mention whatsoever of Khan in "The Panama Papers". Bangladesh-based British journalist David Bergman has clarified that the only Bangladeshi people linked to offshore companies as released by the ICIJ relate to an earlier 2013 leak of information involving the British Virgin Islands.

In May 2016, Khan was appointed Honorary Consul General of Finland in Bangladesh due to his business relationship with Finland. In particular, Aziz Khan had built close trade relationships with Finnish company Wärtsilä, who has supplied machinery and equipment to many of the Summit Group's power project. Khan later visited the Rohingya camps in Kutupalong with the Finnish ambassadors to India and Myanmar.

Also in 2016, Khan led Summit Group in securing $190 million in a consortium led by Standard Chartered to finance a 335 megawatt power plant. Khan also helped arrange the largest ever direct loan given to a Bangladeshi company in 2016 for $210 million by Asian Development Bank, International Finance Corporation and Islamic Development Bank. Khan has also indicated that Summit may list on the Singapore Stock Exchange, making it the first Bangladeshi company to do so.

In September 2016, Khan announced that Summit Group has established a Singaporean company that it will publicly list in Singapore and help raise $2.5 billion to invest in Bangladesh projects such as a liquified natural gas terminal and additional power capacity.

In January 2017, Summit Group announced that it would build a $500 million LNG terminal in Moheshkhali, Bangladesh. The project brings GE as an equity partner. Khan has said, "We want to ensure constant supply of primary energy for the country by implementing this project."

In 2018, Forbes Asia listed Khan and family for the first time as the 34th richest in Singapore. In 2020, Forbes listed Muhammed Aziz Khan 37th richest in Singapore.

In 2021, Khan shared his plans with Bloomberg about Summit, JERA and Mitsubishi Corporation to jointly bid for an estimated US$2.3 billion in FSRU projects in Payra (Bangladesh), Kerawalapitiya (Sri Lanka) and Pakistan as he sees demand for storage increasing as governments face volatility in natural gas prices.

== Positions ==
- Chairman, Summit Group of companies, the largest infrastructure conglomerate in Bangladesh
- Chairman, Summit Power International, the largest Independent Power Producer (IPP) in Bangladesh
- Chairman of Summit Asia Pacific Pte. Ltd.
- Chairman, Summit Corporation Limited
- Chairman, Summit Alliance Port Limited (SAPL), a publicly listed company in Bangladesh
- Chairman, Summit Holdings Limited
- Chairman, Summit Technopolis Limited
- Member, UNICEF International Council
- Honorary Consul General of Finland in Bangladesh
- Chairman, The Anjuman and Aziz Charitable Trust (AACT)
- Trustee, Prothom Alo Trust
- Chairman, Siraj Khaleda Trust
- Former chairman, Summit Power Limited (SPL), a publicly listed company in Bangladesh
- Former chairman, Summit Oil and Shipping Company Limited (SOSCL)
- Former chairman, Summit Communications Limited
- Former chairman, Summit Towers Limited
- Former chairman, Cosmopolitan Communications Limited
- Former chairman, IPCO Hotels and IPCO Developments Limited
- Former president, Bangladesh Association of Publicly Listed Companies (BAPLC)
- Former director, National Housing Finance and Investments Limited
- Founder chairman (2009–2015), Prothom Alo Trust.
- Founding president, Bangladesh Scouts Foundation
- Member, board of trustees, Asian University of Women (AUW)

== Recognition ==
- 2023 COVID-19 Resilience Medal nominated by Singapore Ministry of Health. (The COVID-19 Resilience Medal is a national awards to recognise the substantive contributions of those who participated directly in Singapore's fight against COVID-19)
- 2023 Sher-e-Bangla Peace Award
- 2023 Public Service Medal (COVID-19) (Pingat Bakti Masyarakat) from Singapore Prime Minister's Office for outstanding contributions supporting migrant workers in Singapore and philanthropic effort
- 2022 Priyadarshni Academy's Global Award for Outstanding Contribution to Bangladesh's Infrastructure
- 2020 Asia's Outstanding Leader at ACES Awards
- 2018 Global Asian of the Year
- 2015 Business Person of the Year, DHL & Daily Star Business Awards
- 2023 Pingat Bakti Maskaryan (Public Service Medal), and COVID-19 Resilience Medal by the Prime Minister's Office of Singapore

== Personal life ==
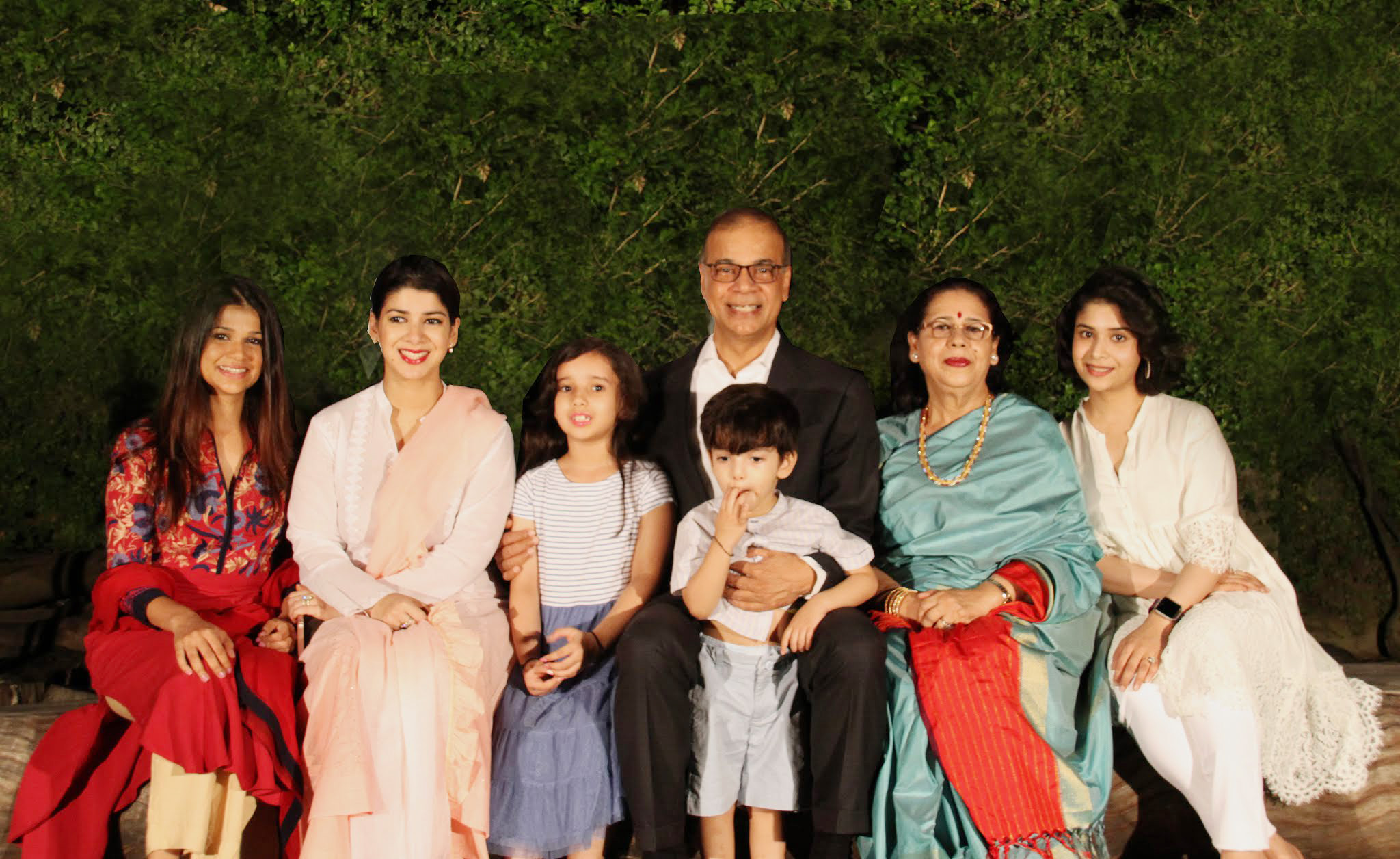
Khan with his wife Anjuman Aziz Khan, three daughters and grandchildren.

Khan is a permanent resident of Singapore. He is married to Anjuman Aziz Khan. He met Anjuman as her tutor. They live in both Bangladesh and Singapore. Their residence in Dhaka, Serenity's Lodge, was designed by the architect Nahas Ahmed Khalil.

They have three daughters, Ayesha, Adeeba and Azeeza. Ayesha Khan is the managing director & CEO of Summit Power International. His second daughter Dr Adeeba Aziz Khan is a fellow at Wolfson College, Cambridge University. His youngest daughter Azeeza Aziz Khan is one of the directors of Summit Group of companies. He has five grandchildren.

He is the third of seven brothers. His eldest brother, Lt Col (Rtd) Faruk Khan is a Member of Parliament (MP) and a former minister. His brothers Zafer Ummeed Khan, Latif Khan and Farid Khan are vice-chairmen of the Summit Group of Companies. Khan is a founding member of Prothom Alo Trust.

Among his close friends is Hamiduzzaman Khan (1946-2025), an artist and sculptor. Khan commissioned Bangladesh's first-ever sculpture park and named it the Prof Hamiduzzaman Sculpture Park. Khan spoke at an event in remembrance of the sculptor. Among the sculptures is the country's longest mural.

== Anjuman and Aziz Charitable Trust (AACT) ==
In 2022, Anjuman and Aziz Charitable Trust (AACT) of Bangladesh joined UNICEF's international council to help address the learning crisis caused by the COVID-19 pandemic, enabling 3,000 vulnerable children to re-enter education and catch up on lost learning many of whom were forced to drop out of school during the pandemic. The Anjuman and Aziz Charitable Trust made a four-year partnership with the United Nations International Children's Emergency Fund (UNICEF), now officially the United Nations Children's Fund.

The AACT has pledged to continue supporting UNICEF Bangladesh in enabling the education of some of the most disadvantaged out-of-school children in the country, many of whom were forced to drop out of school during the COVID-19 pandemic.

AACT's support will enable UNICEF's specialised learning programme to be offered to 3,000 children living in Dhaka South City Corporation Zones 3, 4, and 5 who have dropped out of school. These areas see some of the highest rates of out-of-school children in Bangladesh, with one of every three children deprived of education in some neighbourhoods.

UNICEF will provide them with a unique approach to learn in a safe environment, until they either graduate from primary school or catch up until they and can be mainstreamed into regular schools. The programme will also benefit an estimated 5,000 parents and community leaders through community outreach activities.

The trustees of AACT, Anjuman Aziz Khan, Muhammed Aziz Khan, Hanns Kendel and Christian Prokopp joined the UNICEF's International Council at its annual symposium in Copenhagen in October 2022. They are the first members from Bangladesh to have joined the council.

== Controversies ==
In April 2016, Khan, his wife Anjum Aziz Khan, daughter Ayesha Aziz Khan, brother Zafar Umayed Khan and nephew Faisal Karim Khan were found in the Panama Papers. It found that six offshore companies, mostly located in the British Virgin Islands, were being operated using addresses in their names.

The National Board of Revenue has launched an investigation into Bangladeshi politicians and businessmen, including Khan, for money laundering and tax evasion. Moreover, the Anti-Corruption Commission has formed a committee to investigate.

Some allege that Summit’s success in the power sector is because of political connections. Retired Colonel Faruk Khan, a brother of Khan, is a member of the Awami League President's Congregation and the former Minister of Civil Aviation and Tourism in the government.

On 7 October 2024, Bangladesh Financial Intelligence Unit directed all the banks and financial institutions in Bangladesh to freeze the accounts of Khan and 11 members of his family.
