= Busts of the Seven Bir Sreshtho =

Coordinates: 22.463607°N 90.382345°E

Busts of the Seven Bir Sreshtho

Busts of the Seven Bir Sreshtho are sculptures of Bangladesh’s seven Bir Sreshtho freedom fighters, installed at the Patuakhali Science and Technology University. The busts are placed in a row on the left side of the main entrance of the administrative building, beside the ‘Bijoy-24’ road of the university.

In front of the administrative building, busts of Nur Mohammad Sheikh, Mohammad Ruhul Amin, Hamidur Rahman, Munshi Abdur Rouf, Mostafa Kamal, Mohiuddin Jahangir, and Matiur Rahman are mounted in sequence on seven column-shaped pedestals. Each bust, including its pedestal, stands about five to six feet high.
