= Alliance Holdings Limited =

Bangladeshi conglomerate company

- Company type: Private
- Founded: 1998; 28 years ago
- Founder: Jowher Rizvi
- Headquarters: Dhaka, Bangladesh
- Key people: Jowher Rizvi (chairman); Yasser Rizvi (managing director)
- Revenue: ▲US$142 million
- Number of employees: 5,000
- Website: ahlbd.com

Alliance Holdings Limited (AHL) is a Bangladeshi conglomerate company based in Dhaka, Bangladesh. It is active in business areas such as inland container terminals, prefabricated steel building manufacturing, power generation, lubricant blending, and financial services.

== History ==
Alliance Holdings Limited was founded in 1998 by Jowher Rizvi as a holding company in Bangladesh.

In April 2010, Alliance Holdings announced its plan to offer 35 million shares at Tk 10 each in a public flotation. The capital raised was intended for business expansion and investment in infrastructure sectors such as power, telecom, and shipbuilding.

In 2021, Alliance Holdings and The Social Loan Company (TSLC), a Singapore-based firm, formed a joint venture to launch the digital credit application CASHe in Bangladesh.

Over the years, Alliance Holdings has held a shareholding in companies such as Summit Alliance Port Limited and Global Beverage Company Limited, a franchisee for various soft drinks such as Virgin, Zam Zam, and Shark Energy. It has also held a stake in the Industrial Promotion and Development Company of Bangladesh (IPDC), Bangladesh's first private sector financial institution.

== Subsidiaries ==
- Summit Alliance Port Limited
- Ispahani Summit Alliance Terminal Limited
- Oriental Oil Company Limited
- Alliance Oil Limited
- Lankan Alliance Finance Limited
- PEB Steel Alliance Limited
- Union Accessories Limited
- Fountain Garments Manufacturing Limited
- CASHe Alliance Limited

== See also ==
- List of companies of Bangladesh
- Summit Alliance Port Limited
