= Hamiduzzaman Khan =

Bangladeshi sculptor (1946–2025)

- হামিদুজ্জামান খান
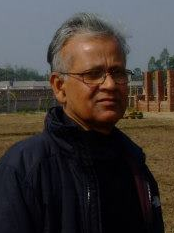
- Born: 16 March 1946; Kishoreganj, Bengal Province, British India
- Died: 20 July 2025 (aged 79); Dhaka, Bangladesh
- Education: University of Dhaka; Maharaja Sayajirao University of Baroda
- Occupation: Sculptor
- Spouse: Ivy Zaman (m. 1976)
- Awards: full list

Hamiduzzaman Khan (16 March 1946 – 20 July 2025) was a Bangladeshi visual artist and sculptor. He is well known as a sculptor for his theme and form oriented sculptures, in particular sculptures on the theme of Bangladesh War of Liberation and birds. Following the introduction of modernity in sculpture in Bangladesh in the 1950s by Novera Ahmed, Khan was instrumental in the popularization of sculpture in the country through his distinctive form of modernity. Influenced by Alberto Giacometti and Henry Moore, his works manifest expressionism, minimalism, and a constant exploration of purity of material.

Khan was a painter who, even before becoming known as a sculptor, gained recognition for his watercolour and acrylic paintings in the late 1960s. Zainul Abedin, the founding father of Bangladeshi modern art, acclaimed and encouraged Khan for his watercolours. His watercolours are characterized by abstract expressionism and predominantly on the subjects of natural landscape and human figure.

For his contribution to sculpture, Khan was awarded Ekushey Padak, the second-highest civilian award in Bangladesh, in 2006. In a career spanning over five decades, his works have been exhibited and installed in Bangladesh, South Korea, India, and the United States.

== Early life and education ==
Khan was born in 1946 in the village Sahasram in Kishoreganj. Indian artist Hemen Majumdar hailed from Gachihata, a neighbouring village of Sahasram. Khan used to visit his house as a young boy. His early education was in his native village schools and he completed matriculation in 1962. He then got admitted in the erstwhile East Pakistan College of Arts and Crafts (now Faculty of Fine Arts, University of Dhaka). At the College of Arts and Crafts, he studied under the guidance of artists Zainul Abedin, Safiuddin Ahmed, Aminul Islam, and Mustafa Manwar. Zainul Abedin appreciated and encouraged Khan for his watercolour paintings. While he was a third-year student, Abedin presented one of Khan's paintings to the President of Burma, Ne Win, during his visit to the art college. He received Bachelor of Fine Arts degree in 1967 from the Department of Painting and Drawing. Khan was one of the few early students of the college who took an interest in sculpture, but there was no opportunity of taking sculpture as a formal subject as an undergraduate in the college. Meanwhile, the college had established the Department of Sculpture and Modelling with Abdur Razzaque as its founding head.

=== Accident and visit to Europe ===
When Khan was a student in the final year class, he experienced a road accident that fractured his skull, causing him to have a reconstructive surgery in the head. However, he could sit for the final examination in time. As there was no facility for the surgery in Dhaka, he was advised to receive treatment from the Western General Hospital in Edinburgh. After graduation, he set out for Scotland by ship. This was a turning point in Khan's career. On the way, Khan saw traditional African carvings and masks in Dakar, and rocky shores in Cape Town, at stopovers. Following the surgery, at the advice of the doctors, he stayed around in the United Kingdom for some time for total healing of the surgery. During this stay in Edinburgh, he visited the National Museum of Scotland and was impressed by Henry Moore's sculptures in public places. Then he visited London, experienced artworks at the British Museum, Victoria and Albert Museum, National Gallery, Tate Galleries and was fascinated by landscape paintings by John Constable. Khan was particularly fascinated by modern abstract forms in sculpture, large scale application of sculpture in enhancing the aesthetic quality of urban landscape and its impact in civic life. Sculptures installed in public spaces in Montmartre, Montparnasse and a solo exhibition of Alberto Giacometti had a lasting impact in his mind. On his return to Dhaka in 1969, Khan decided to specialize in sculpture and requested Abdur Razzaque to teach him sculpture. He worked with Razzaque for six months.

=== Studies in India and the United States ===
Khan was awarded an Indian Government scholarship in 1974 to study for a Master of Fine Arts degree. He then went on to study at the Faculty of Fine Arts, Maharaja Sayajirao University of Baroda, earning his master's degree in bronze casting in 1976. At Baroda, he studied in the tutelage of notable contemporary Indian artists Raghav Kaneria, Mahendra Pandia, Sankho Chaudhuri, and K. G. Subramanyan. During his stay in Baroda as a student, he participated in the exhibition commemorating the twenty-fifth anniversary of Faculty of Fine Arts, University of Baroda. His works included two sculptures made of bronze and one made of plaster—all depicting the terrible experiences of the Bangladesh War of Liberation. Khan was praised by artist M. F. Husain and was awarded first prize for his work.

He went to the United States and received training in metal casting at the Sculpture Center School in New York City from 1982 to 1983. He was influenced by Henry Moore, when he visited an exhibition of Moore's work in New York City. In 1983, the Embassy of Bangladesh in Washington D.C. organized a solo exhibition of Khan with the sculptures he made during his stay in New York City.

== Career ==
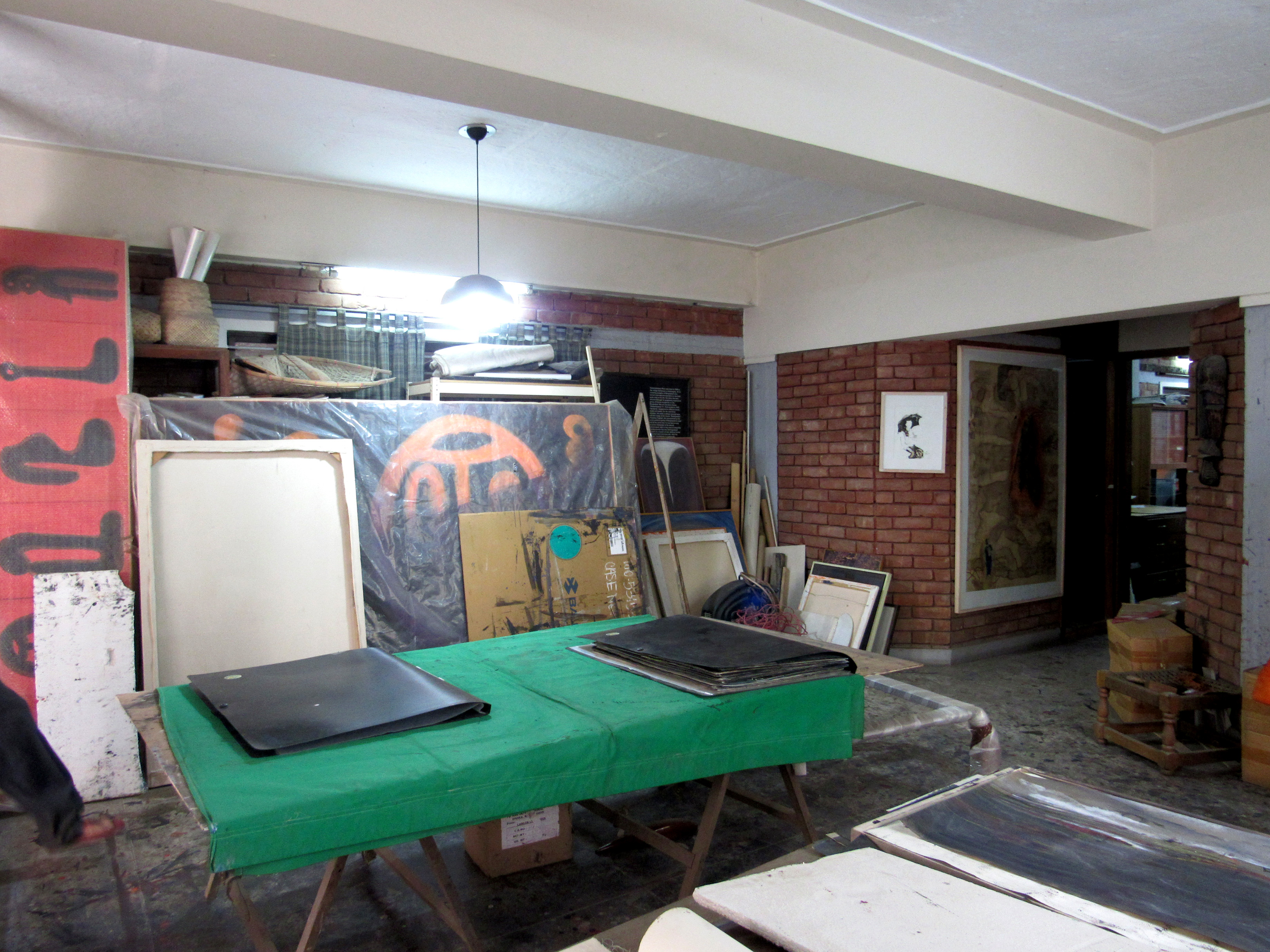
Painting studio of Hamiduzzaman Khan, in Dhaka.

Prior to focusing on sculpture, Khan supplemented his income through watercolour paintings. When he was a student in the Institute of Fine Arts, the then principal of the institute Zainul Abedin bought Khan's paintings. An exhibition with his watercolour paintings, done in the period from 1963 to 1969, was held in Chittagong Club in 1969. All the paintings from the exhibition were sold to Chittagong Club and, the earning helped him for his treatment abroad. In 1982, the World Bank bought three of his paintings for interior decoration of the World Bank Headquarters in Washington D.C.

=== Beginnings ===
Khan joined the Department of Sculpture, University of Dhaka as a lecturer in August, 1970. Soon began the War of Liberation of the country in March 1971. He had to face interrogation by the Pakistan Armed Forces but was left unharmed. Two days after the army crackdown in Dhaka on 25 March, he went to the New Market area and saw many dead bodies lying unattended. The ghastly scenes and atrocities of the war made permanent impressions in his mind, resulting in his series of works on the theme titled Remembrance '71. The victims and the martyrs of the war remained a recurring theme in his imagery in the first two decades following the emergence of the nation-state of Bangladesh in 1971. He worked with his teacher Abdur Razzaque, in the first-ever commissioned sculptural work on the liberation war theme 1972. The piece, titled Jagroto Chowrongi (The Vigilant Crossroads) is the figure of a lone freedom fighter and has become a symbol of the heroic War of Liberation in the country.

He presented sculptures, made with bronze, on the theme Remembrance '71, in the first-ever National Sculpture Exhibition organized by the Bangladesh Shilpakala Academy in December 1976. He received the Best Sculptor's Award at the exhibition for his sculpture Dorja (door). It portrays the image of a house-door with a martyred figure lying in the doorstep.

=== 1980s and 1990s ===
Khan's major recognition as a sculptor came in 1980 when he was commissioned by the Government of Bangladesh to make a sculpture to be installed at the entrance of the Bangabhaban (President's House). For this commission, he created a sculpture, titled The Bird Family, composed of three standing birds and made of brass sheets, pipes, and marble. Initially, the ministers did not like his sculpture and said that it would be displaced. Later, the French ambassador to Bangladesh, while visiting Bangabhaban, notified the then-president Ziaur Rahman that it was contemporary with the sculptures of France. Following that occurrence, the government officials invited Khan to Bangabhaban and praised his work.

In 1981, he was commissioned by the Bangladesh Army to make a sculpture for the Jalalabad Cantonment in Sylhet. The sculpture he made was titled Hamla (Onslaught), based on the theme freedom fighter. In 1985, he created another sculpture on the same theme for the Bangla Academy. Khan organized his first solo sculpture exhibition at the gallery of Faculty of Fine Arts in 1982, with works primarily based on the liberation war theme. The exhibition drew a large number of viewers and received appreciation from critics and connoisseurs. He participated in 6th Triennial Art Exhibition in New Delhi, organized by Lalit Kala Akademi in 1986, as an official entrant from Bangladesh. He organized a solo sculpture exhibition at the Alliance Française de Dhaka in 1987. Bangladesh Shilpakala Academy awarded him the Best Sculptor's Award for his work at the National Sculpture Exhibition in 1987. In 1988, his sculpture on the liberation war theme titled Jagrotobangla (The Vigilant Bangla) was installed at the Zia Fertilizer Factory in Ashuganj, Brahmanbaria. It was made of reinforced concrete and marble, symbolizing the hand of a freedom fighter with a rifle.

Khan received his first major international recognition when he was invited by the Olympic Committee in Seoul, Republic of Korea in 1988 to install an open-air sculpture at the Seoul Olympic Park. The sculpture is titled Steps, made of welded copper with a height of 13 feet. It symbolizes steps to freedom and progress. In 1990, he received a commission from Jahangirnagar University to install a sculpture in front of the Central Library of the university. The title of the sculpture was Shangshaptak. Made of steel armature and brass steel, it depicts a freedom fighter, having an amputated leg and an amputated hand, charging ahead fearlessly. This remains one of Khan's best-known works. The figure has later been recast in modified form and in different media to be placed at different locations in Bangladesh. The most prominent one of these is the sculpture titled Freedom Fighter, made with stainless steel pipe which was installed in 2003 at the entrance of UTC Building located in Panthapath, Dhaka. He was invited at the Puyo International Modern Sculpture Symposium in Korea in 1999. For this symposium, he created a 10-feet high sculpture in steel sheet which was exhibited at the Puyo Bodrek Park. He created a sculpture, titled Muktijoddha (The Freedom Fighter) for the Mymensingh Cantonment in 1999.

=== From 2000 to 2025 ===
Khan became a Professor at the Department of Sculpture, University of Dhaka in 2000. In 2001, he created a sculpture, composed of a group of freedom fighters, titled Bijoy Keton which was installed in the Dhaka Cantonment. In 2004, he created a sculpture titled Birds, which was a delineation of birds in abstract forms, and was placed at the entrance of United Bhaban in Gulshan, Dhaka. In the same year, the World Bank Bangladesh Country Office installed Khan's sculpture in the atrium of its office in Dhaka. The work consists of three similar forms, depicting birds in abstraction. In addition to that, the World Bank office installed his relief work at the entrance, decorated the interior with 18 of his oil-paintings, terracotta, a metal-sculpture highlighting fish, and a mural.

The Dhaka City Corporation commissioned Khan in 2005 to create a sculpture to be placed at Farmgate intersection in Dhaka. The piece is titled Fish, which depicts three fishes in spontaneous posture. The work remains as a popular artwork in public space in the busy neighborhood of Dhaka. Khan's two sculptures in metal adorn the lawns of Bangabandhu Sheikh Mujibur Rahman Novo Theatre. One is a nearly man height abstract arch in deep blue and the other is a hard-edge semi-abstract seated bird in red. His sculpture, titled Shikha, a geometric abstract in painted sheet metal was placed at the entrance of the National University, Bangladesh. It has a height of 32 feet and a width of 13 feet and symbolizes enlightenment through education.

He created a sculpture, titled Peace Bird, on the theme of birds at the request of students of the University of Dhaka. It has been installed in front of the Teacher-Student Centre in 2007, and depicts a group of birds in different postures in abstract form. He published a book in 2007, titled Rose Garden, containing illustrations of the historic Rose Garden Palace in pen-and-ink, crayon, and watercolour. In 2011, he was commissioned by Bangladesh Bank to install a sculpture at the premises of Bangladesh Bank headquarters in Motijheel. The work is titled Unity. It is a 32-feet stainless steel sculpture, featuring two hands in abstract form holding together a globe.

Khan retired from the University of Dhaka in 2012. He continued to teach sculpture at several universities in Dhaka. Bangladesh National Museum organized an exhibition of Khan in 2017, titled Hamiduzzaman Khan Retrospective, which displayed over 300 sculptural pieces and 25 paintings spanning his career between 1964 and 2017. As of 2017, 25 solo exhibitions of Khan have been held. In 2019, the Hamiduzzaman Sculpture Park was inaugurated. In a career spanning more than four decades, he created over 150 sculptures which are located both in his home-country of Bangladesh and abroad.

=== Prof Hamiduzzaman Khan Sculpture Park ===
Inaugurated in 2019, Prof Hamiduzzaman Khan Sculpture Park is Bangladesh’s first sculpture park is named after the award-winning sculptor whose career spanned over five decades and can be seen in public places, office complexes, and museums in Bangladesh and abroad. Stretching over 5 acres of land inside the premises of the Summit Gazipur 464 MW power plant, the park displays sculptures on diverse themes and media. The park contains 19 sculptures on different themes including folk-culture, the Bangladesh War of Liberation, birds, faces, and figures, and pays tribute to the Bangla language, diversity, and other themes. He employed metal, stone, granite, steel-wire, and cement in his creations. The park also boasts the longest mural in Bangladesh.

The mural, titled Srom O Srishti, (meaning Labour and Creation) with a length of 340 feet, symbolizes a fusion between labour and creation, and highlights the importance of electricity in modern civilisation. It captures the various forms of turbine, wheel, cogs, and other industrial equipment in motion. As the park is inside power plant premises, Khan incorporated scientific aspects, apart from artistic depictions of subjects. A book was published on June 2022, titled "Hamiduzzaman Sculpture Park".

== Style ==
Khan's sculptural practice engaged with ideas concerning Bangladesh War of Liberation, birds, human face, human figure and natural objects, binding together personal experiences, and historical references. The majority of Khan's sculptures were made of bronze and steel. He also worked with stone, aluminium, white granite, marble, and mixed-media. His large-scale sculptures were mostly made of concrete and bronze. Though majority of his early sculptures were built in the expressionist style, his works after 2000 reflected minimalism with constant exploration for purity of forms and material. The composition of his sculptures is characterized by architectural and geometric shapes. The war remembrance theme continued in Khan through 1985 till 1988, in different styles. In the mid-1980s he produced some faces and masks that depicted the tortured faces of the Bengali women. His watercolour and acrylic paintings predominantly delineated landscape and natural elements, in particular, wetlands, birds, rural panoramas, greenery, cloudy skies, deep forests, and hills. Many of his paintings bear sculptural attributes.

== Personal life and death ==
Hamiduzzaman Khan married Ivy Zaman in 1976. Ivy Zaman graduated in sculpture from the Faculty of Fine Arts, University of Dhaka. She is an artist and sculptor by profession. They have two sons, Zubair Zaman Khan Copper and Zarif Hamiduzzaman.

Hamiduzzaman Khan died from pneumonia and dengue fever on 20 July 2025, at the age of 79.

== Exhibitions ==
=== Solo ===
- An Indigenous Minimalist, Bengal Gallery of Fine Art, Dhaka, Bangladesh, (2002).
- Homage to Matter, The British Council, Dhaka, Bangladesh, (2006).
- Recent Sculpture and Other Works, Galleri Kaya, Dhaka, Bangladesh, (2006).
- The Intimate World of Colour, Gallery of Fine Art, Asiatic Society of Bangladesh, Dhaka, Bangladesh, (2008).
- Nocturnal Shades, Bengal Gallery of Fine Arts, Dhaka, Bangladesh, (2010).
- Time and Beyond, Galleri Kaya, Dhaka, Bangladesh, (2010).
- Watercolours & Sculptures, Galleri Kaya, Dhaka, Bangladesh, (2012).
- Earthly Treasures, Athena Gallery, Dhaka, Bangladesh, (2014).
- Stones, Galleri Kaya, Dhaka, Bangladesh, (2014).
- Stones-2, Galleri Kaya, Dhaka, Bangladesh, (2016).
- Of Watercolours, Boats and Faces, Shilpangan Gallery, Dhaka, Bangladesh, (2016).
- Jiban Annashane, Institute of Architects Bangladesh, Dhaka, Bangladesh, (2017).
- Hamiduzzaman Khan Retrospective, Nalinikanta Bhattashali Gallery, Bangladesh National Museum, Dhaka, Bangladesh, (2017).
- Nocurnal Shades, Abinta Gallery of Fine Arts, Dhaka, Bangladesh, (2018).
- Display of Early Watercolours by Hamiduzzaman Khan, Galleri Kaya, Dhaka, Bangladesh, (2018).
- Feeling the Void, Dwip Gallery, Dhaka, Bangladesh, (2019).

=== Group ===
- World Invitational Open-air Sculpture Exhibition, Seoul Olympic Park, Seoul, Republic of Korea, (1988).
- Soft Reflections, Gallery Cosmos, Dhaka, Bangladesh, (2015).
- Manobotar Pokkhe Sahingsotar Biruddhe Chitrakarma, Gallery Cosmos, Dhaka, Bangladesh, (2015).
- 11th Anniversary Exhibition by Galleri Kaya, Galleri Kaya, Dhaka, Bangladesh, (2015).
- Brave Heart, Gallery Cosmos, Dhaka, Bangladesh, (2015).
- 13th Anniversary Exhibition by Galleri Kaya, Galleri Kaya, Dhaka, Bangladesh, (2017).
- Jolokabbo, Edge Gallery, Dhaka, Bangladesh, (2017).
- Contemporary and Modern Art of Bangladesh, Galleri Kaya, Dhaka, Bangladesh, (2017).
- Fourth National Sculpture Exhibition, Bangladesh Shilpakala Academy, Dhaka, Bangladesh, (2018).
- 14th Anniversary Exhibition by Galleri Kaya, Galleri Kaya, Dhaka, Bangladesh, (2018).
- Still Life 2018, Gallery Chitrak, Dhaka, Bangladesh, (2018).
- Bangladesh-Nepal Friendship Fine Arts Exhibition-2018, Park Gallery, Lalitpur, Nepal (2018).
- Soaked in Paper, Galleri Kaya, Dhaka, Bangladesh, (2019).
- Festival of Fine Art, Zainul Gallery, Faculty of Fine Arts, University of Dhaka, Dhaka, Bangladesh, (2019).
- 15th Anniversary Exhibition by Galleri Kaya, Galleri Kaya, Dhaka, Bangladesh, (2019).
- Prologue 01, Dhaka Gallery, Dhaka, Bangladesh, (2019).
- Group Watercolour Exhibition, Zainul Gallery, Faculty of Fine Arts, University of Dhaka, Dhaka, Bangladesh, (2020).

== Awards ==
- Best Sculptor's Award by Bangladesh Shilpakala Academy, (1976).
- Best Award in the Life Oriented Art Exhibition, Bangladesh Shilpakala Academy, (1976).
- Prime Minister's Award for contribution in the beautification of Dhaka city, (2006).
- Ekushey Padak, for contribution in sculpture, (2006).
- SM Sultan Gold Medal, by Bangladesh Shilpakala Academy, (2012).
- Zainul Honour 2019, by Faculty of Fine Arts, University of Dhaka, (2019).

== Gallery ==
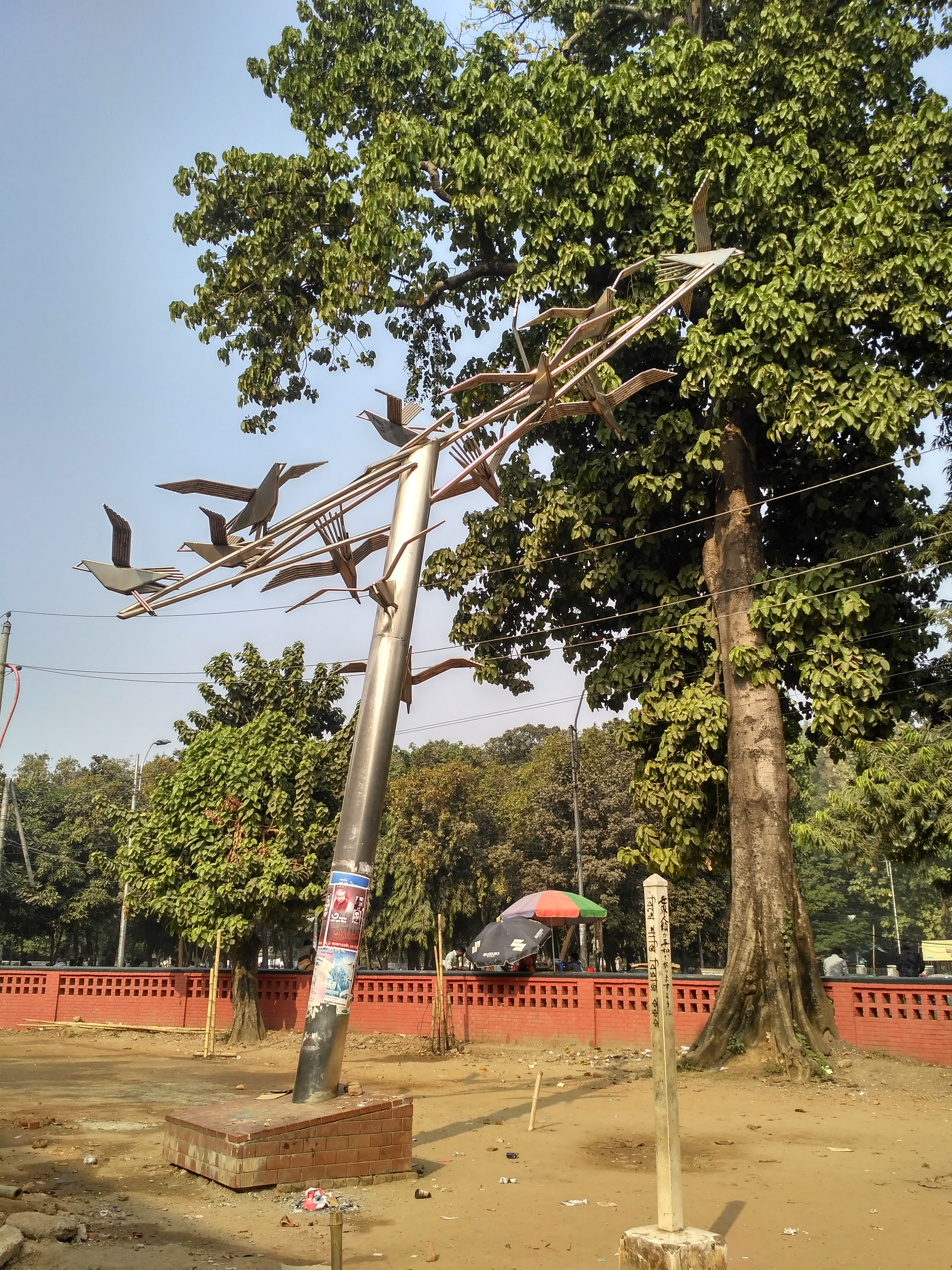
The sculpture " Shantir Paira" (means Dove of Peace ) in front of TSC of Dhaka University made by Sculptor Hamiduzzaman Khan. (Photo of November 2018)

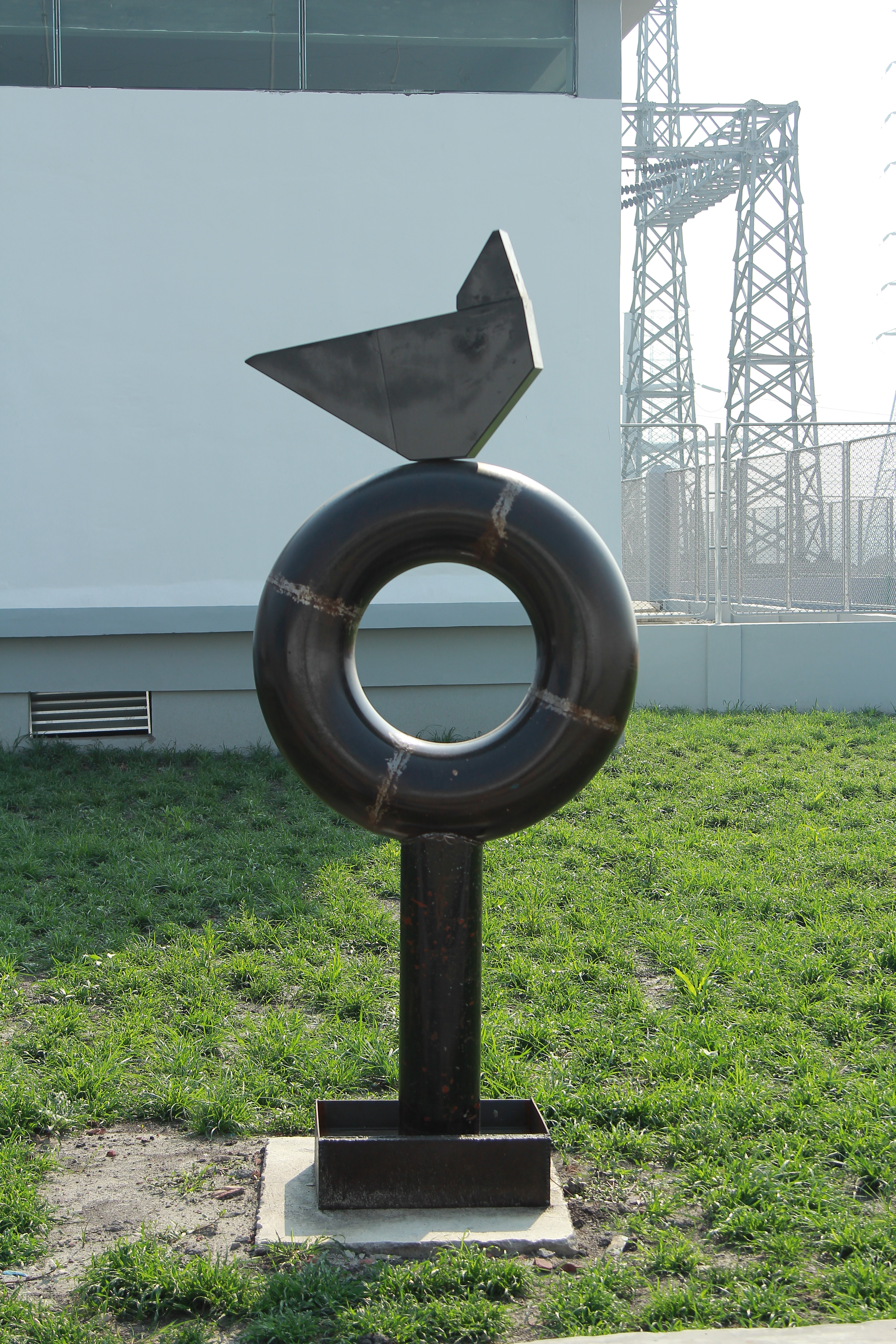
Sculpture "Life and the Lifeless"

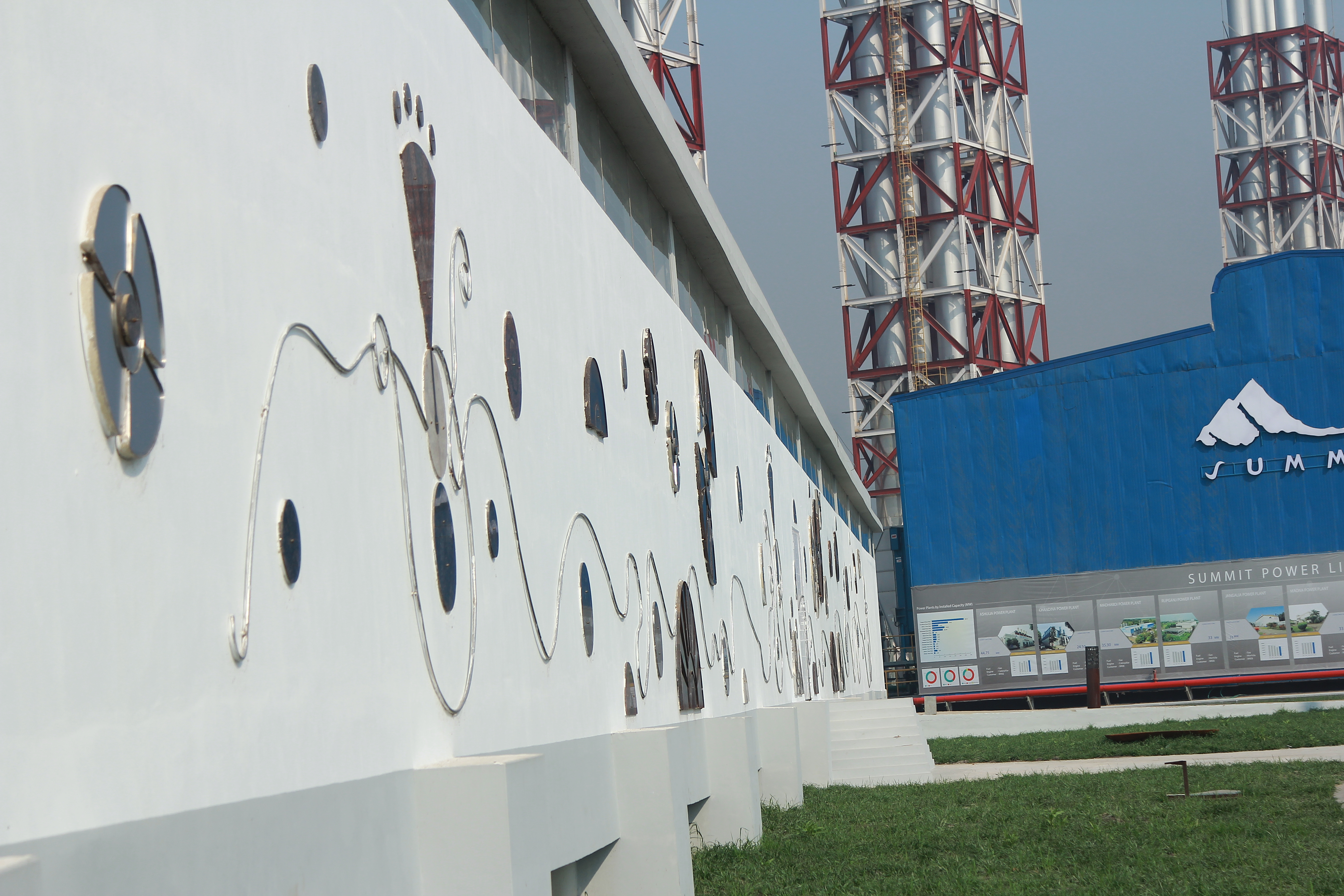
Mural "Srom O Sristi"
