= Ghaseti Bibi Mosque =

Mosque in Patuakhali, Bangladesh

- ঘসেটি বিবির মসজিদ

Religion
- Affiliation: Islam
- Ownership: Department of Archaeology (Bangladesh)
- Status: Preserved

Location
- Location: Shoula village, Kalaia Union, Bauphal Upazila, Patuakhali District, Barisal Division
- Country: Bangladesh

Architecture
- Founder: Ghaseti Begum

Ghaseti Bibi Mosque (Bengali: ঘসেটি বিবির মসজিদ) or Ghaseti Begum’s Kuthibari is a historic mosque located in Shoula village of Kalaia Union, Bauphal Upazila, Patuakhali District, Bangladesh. It was built by Ghaseti Begum, the eldest daughter of Nawab Alivardi Khan and the aunt of Nawab Siraj ud-Daulah. It is believed that the mosque was constructed about three and a half centuries ago. At present, the mosque is under the supervision of the archaeology department.

== History ==
According to Bauphal Upazila Parishad records, no definitive information exists regarding the exact date of the mosque’s construction. Local traditions suggest that during the medieval period, the area along the banks of the Tentulia River was a major zamindari center. It is believed that around 280 to 300 years ago, during one of her travels, Ghaseti Begum built a mosque here.

According to popular belief, during the time of the Battle of Plassey, Ghaseti Begum or one of her close relatives took refuge here and built structures. Local elders claim that she constructed a kuthibari (residential estate) while staying here for business purposes and lived there for some time. After the Nawabi era ended, during British rule, locals began using the kuthibari for prayers. Eventually, it became popularly known as Ghaseti Begum’s Mosque.

== See also ==
- Ghaseti Begum
- List of mosques in Bangladesh
