= Mukta Bangla (Islamic University) =

Sculptures of Islamic University Kushtia

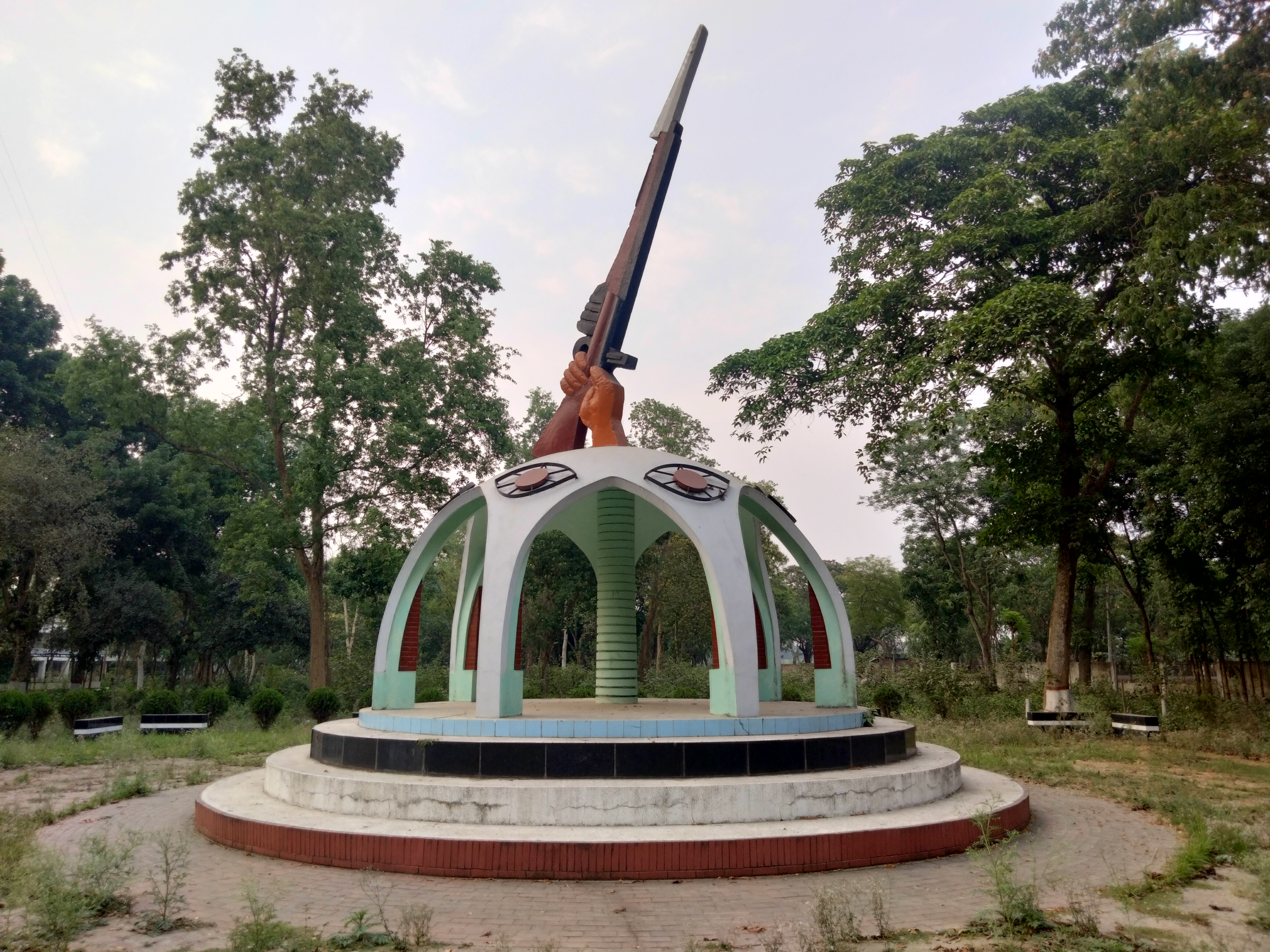

General information
- Architectural style: Islamic and modern architecture
- Location: Islamic University campus, Kushtia District, Bangladesh
- Inaugurated: 16 December 1996
- Owner: Islamic University, Bangladesh

Technical details
- Material: Ceramic brick, white, black and mosaic stone
- Floor count: 7 column

Design and construction
- Architect: Rashid Ahmed
- Known for: Monument of Liberation War of Bangladesh

Mukta Bangla (Bengali: মুক্ত বাংলা, lit. 'Free and independent Bengal') is one of the well known sculptures of Bangladesh to commemorate the history of Bangladesh Liberation War.

== History ==
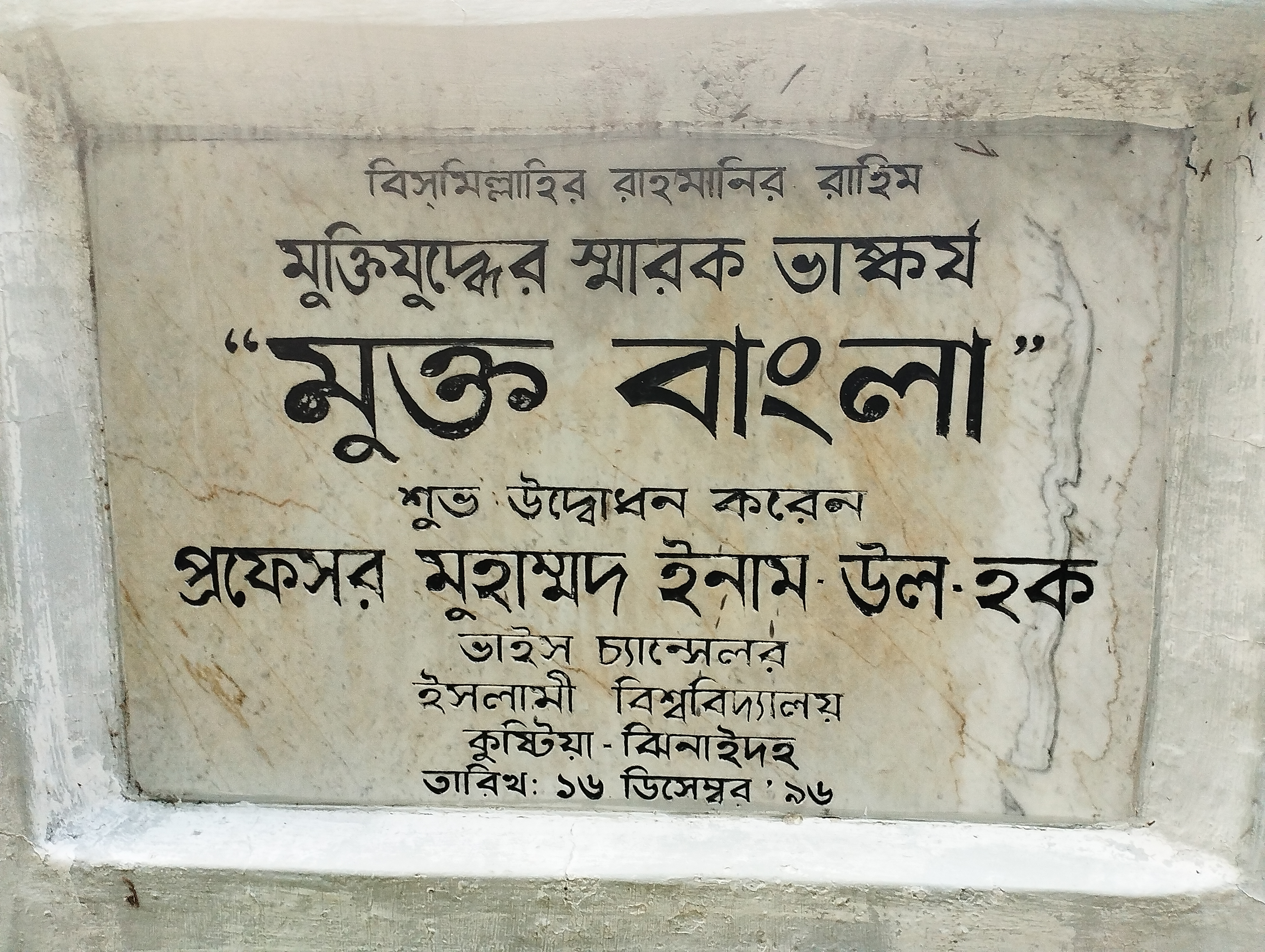
Inaugural Memorial of the Mukta Bangla Sculpture, 1996

The sculpture was built in 1996 beside to the main gate of Islamic University Kushtia. The sculpture was designed by artist Rashid Ahmed. The sculpture is built with a combination of Islamic architecture and modern ideas. Muhammad Enam-Ul Haq, the fourth Vice-Chancellor of the Islamic University, inaugurated the sculpture on 16 December 1996.

== Location ==
The Mukta Bangla sculpture is located north side of the main gate of the Kushtia Islamic University campus in Kushtia district. On the west side of the sculpture is the located administrative building of the university and on the south side is a sculpture Mrutanjayi Mujib of Sheikh Mujibur Rahman. According to the geographical coordinate system, the location of the Muktbangla sculpture is 23.7230336°N 90.1526242°E.

== Architectural significance ==
There is a circular black plate at the entrance of Mukta Bangla. The Mukta Bangla sculpture features a clenched fist with a rifle, the weapon of liberation, on the seven-pillared dome. It symbolizes the seven-member cabinet of the Provisional Mujibnagar Government of 1971. Each pillar is built on an arch based on Islamic architecture in a jubilant shape with outstretched arms.

The red sun in the eyes anticipates the rising sun and the lowermost ceramic large brick indicates constant movement of Bengali. The red ceramic brick on the fourth step from the top symbolizes movement and war, The black brick stone on the second step is a symbol of grief and sorrow, The white mosaic stone on the third step symbolizes alliance and communication and The main floor of the altar is green mosaic blue tiles symbolizing peace. And the entire structure is represented by seven arches collectively representing a half-rising sun.

== See also ==
- Islamic University, Bangladesh
- Shabash Bangladesh
