= Swadesh Chandra Samanta =

Bangladeshi agronomist

Swadesh Chandra Samanta (born 31 December 1962) is a Bangladeshi agronomist and Vice-Chancellor of Patuakhali Science and Technology University. He is a professor in the Department of Agriculture of the Patuakhali Science and Technology University.

== Early life and education ==
Samanta was born on 31 December 1962 in Durgapur village, Burichong Upazila, Comilla District, East Pakistan, Pakistan. He received his bachelor's degree and master's degrees from Bangladesh Agricultural University. In 2015, he obtained his PhD degree from Patuakhali Science and Technology University.

== Career ==
Samanta started his teaching career in August 1990 by joining the then Patuakhali Agricultural College (later upgraded to Patuakhali Science and Technology University) as a lecturer. He served as the President and General Secretary of the Patuakhali Science and Technology University Teachers Association. He was involved with Bangabandhu Parishad and the Bangabandhu Education and Research Council.

Samanta, then Registrar of the Patuakhali Science and Technology University, lead negotiation with students in February 2020, who had confined Professor Dr Md Harun-Or-Rashid, Vice-Chancellor of Patuakhali Science and Technology University, and 50 faculty members inside the administrative building. The students were demanding the withdrawal of suspension orders against 15 students for Ragging.

Samanta was appointed as the Vice-Chancellor of Patuakhali Science and Technology University for the next four years on 17 May 2021 by President Mohammad Abdul Hamid. In June 2021, he was served with a legal notice alleging the university carried out illegal recruitments in exchange for bribes. He signed a statement in support of Farid Uddin Ahmed, Vice Chancellor of Shahjalal University of Science and Technology, along with 34 other vice-chancellors.
