= Summit Group =

Bangladeshi conglomerate

- Type: Public
- Industry: Communication, Trading, Energy & Power, Shipping
- Headquarters: Bangladesh HQ: Dhaka, Bangladesh Global HQ: One Raffles Place, Singapore
- Key people: Muhammed Aziz Khan (Chairman)
- Revenue: ▲US$1.2 billion (2019)
- Net income: ▲US$100 million (2019)
- Total assets: ▲US$2.5 billion (2019)
- Owner: Khan family (78%); JERA (22%)
- Parent: JERA
- Website: www.summitpowerinternational.com

Summit Group is a Bangladeshi conglomerate. It has business interests in communication, trading, energy and power, shipping.

== History ==
Summit Power Limited was established on 30 March 1997 in Dhaka, Bangladesh. Muhammed Aziz Khan is the founding chairman of Summit. It is a subsidiary of Summit Power International based in Singapore. On 7 June 2004, Summit Power was made into a public limited company.

In September 2007, the Anti-Corruption Commission filed a case against former Prime Minister Sheikh Hasina, alleging that she accepted a BDT 30 million bribe from Summit Group, Wärtsilä, and United Group in exchange for approving a 100 MW power plant in Khulna. The bribe was used to buy a property in Dhanmondi under the Bangabandhu Memorial Trust. The other accused in the case were Abul Kalam Azad, Nooruddin Mahmud Kamal, Tawfiq-e-Elahi Chowdhury, Muhammed Aziz Khan, Hasan Mahmud Raja, and Farid Khan.

Summit Communication received a nationwide telecommunication transmission network license from Bangladesh Telecommunication Regulatory Commission in 2009, and laid down the largest fibre optic cable network in Bangladesh.

In January 2011, Summit Group signed an agreement with the World Bank to finance the purchase of equipment from General Electric worth US$115 million for Bibiyana power plant.

In November 2012, Summit Group signed an agreement with China Energy Group to cooperate in the energy sector.

Taiyo Life Insurance purchased 12.6 percent of Meghnaghat power plant from Summit Group in 2013 for US$20.3 million.

In July 2014, Summit Group received a US$190 million loan from Standard Chartered Bank for a power plant in Narayanganj District to be built by its subsidiary Summit Meghnaghat Power Company Limited.

In 2016, Summit Group formed Summit Technopolis, a joint venture with Indian company Infinity Infotech Parks Limited, to build a hi-tech park in Gazipur. Summit Group merged Summit Purbanchol Power Company, Summit Narayanganj Power, and Summit Uttaranchal Power Company under Summit Power. Aziz Khan was appointed the honorary counsel general of Finland in Bangladesh.

In April 2017, Summit Group secured a loan from The City Bank for Summit Barisal Power Limited and Summit Narayanganj Power Unit II Limited. It signed an agreement with Bangladesh Power Development Board to build 149MW power plant in Gazipur District. Wärtsilä would supply the equipment for the Gazipur plant. Faisal Khan was appointed additional managing director of Summit Group in July 2017. It received permission to establish a liquefied natural gas terminal in Moheshkhali. The group would invest 3 billion USD to build the terminal with Mitsubishi Corporation. The terminal was given a 15 year tax exemption by the National Board of Revenue.

In 2018, the chairman of Summit, Aziz Khan, was the 34th richest man in Singapore.

In April 2019, Summit Group started supplying the national grid with Liquefied natural gas. In October 2019, JERA purchased a 22 percent of Summit Power International for US$330 million. The company announced plans to invest five billion USD next five years with 60 percent of the investment coming from JERA. It announced a US$500 million joint investment with JERA to build the Matarbari Power Plant.

In May 2020, Summit Group received US$140 million from Clifford Capital Pte Ltd and Sumitomo Mitsui Banking Corporation for the Summit Gazipur II Power Plant. Summit established the Hamiduzzaman Sculpture Park in its Gazipur powerplant.

In 2022, the chairman of Summit, Aziz Khan, was the 42nd richest man in Singapore. According to The Daily Star, Summit Group received the second highest capacity charge from the government of Bangladesh at 12.57 percent of capacity charge payments.

== List of companies ==
- Summit Industrial & Mercantile Corporation (Pvt.) Ltd.
- Cosmopolitan Communications Limited.
- Cosmopolitan Traders (Pvt.) Ltd.
- Cosmopolitan Finance Ltd.
- Summit Power Limited.
- Summit Turbine Division.
- Summit Shipping Ltd.
- Summit Communications Ltd.
- United Summit Coastal Oil Ltd.
- Summit Asia Pacific Pte. Ltd.
- Resources & Solutions Ltd.
- Summit Developers Ltd.
- Summit Towers Ltd.
- Summit Technopolis
- Khulna Power Company Limited (associated company)

== Projects ==
- Summit LNG Terminal
- Summit Meghnaghat Power Company Limited
- Summit Bibiyana Power Company Limited
- Summit Gazipur II Power Limited (Summit Gazipur II Power Plant)
- Summit Gazipur I Power Limited (Summit Gazipur I Power Plant)
- Summit Barisal Power Limited (Summit Barisal Power Plant)
- Summit Narayanganj Power Unit II Limited
- Ashulia Power Plant II
- Narayanganj Power Plant I
- Maona Power Plant
- Madhabdi Power Plant II
- Jangalia Power Plant
- Chandina Power Plant II
- Rupganj Power Plant
- Ullapara Power Plant
- Ashulia Power Plant I
- Chandina Power Plant I
- Madhabdi Power Plant I
- Khulna Power Company Limited Power Plant I
- Khulna Power Company Limited Power Plant II
- Khulna Power Company Limited Power Plant III

== Board of directors ==
| Name | Position | Reference |
|---|---|---|
| Muhammed Aziz Khan | Chairman | |
| Ayesha Aziz Khan | Managing Director | |
| Toshiro Kudama | Director | |
| Takeshi Takahashi | Director | |
| Latif Khan | Director | |
| Faisal Karim Khan | Director | |
| Adeeba Aziz Khan | Director | |
| Azeeza Aziz Khan | Director | |
| Suresh Prabhakar Prabhu | Director | |
| Tang Kin Fei | Director | |

== See also ==
- List of companies of Bangladesh
