= Patuakhali Science and Technology University =

Public university specified for Science and technology in Patuakhali, Bangladesh

Patuakhali Science and Technology University (PSTU)
- পটুয়াখালী বিজ্ঞান ও প্রযুক্তি বিশ্ববিদ্যালয় (পবিপ্রবি)
- Former name: Patuakhali Krishi College (PKC)
- Type: Public university
- Established: 1972; 54 years ago (as Patuakhali Agricultural College); 2000; 26 years ago (as PSTU)
- Accreditation: UGC
- Affiliations: Krishibid Institution Bangladesh
- Chancellor: President Mirza Fakhrul Islam Alamgir
- Vice-Chancellor: Dr. S. M. Hemayet Jahan
- Academic staff: 209
- Students: 3000
- Location: Dumki Upazila, Patuakhali District, 8602, Bangladesh; 22.46424°N 90.38252°E
- Campus: 109.97 acres (44.50 ha) (including Babugonj, 12.97 acres (5.25 ha))
- Language: English
- Colours: Green and black
- Website: pstu.ac.bd

University rankings

Regional – Overall
- QS Asia: 801-850 (2026)

Patuakhali Science and Technology University (Bengali: পটুয়াখালী বিজ্ঞান ও প্রযুক্তি বিশ্ববিদ্যালয়) commonly referred to as PSTU is a public science and technological research university located in Patuakhali in Bangladesh. It was established as Patuakhali Agricultural College in 1972 and gained university status in 2000.

PSTU has given affiliation to the Barisal Government Veterinary College as its constituent faculty. An outer campus is situated at Babuganj in Barishal district. This is Barisal Division's only science and technology university as well as the first public university there.

== Notable students ==
• Nurul Haque Nur

• Abu Sayeed Shuvo

• Hafiz Raihan

• Satyajit Kundu

== History ==
PSTU formally started functioning after promulgation of government gazette notification on 8 July 2000 with the campus of former Patuakhali Agricultural College as its nucleus. The university started with the Faculty of Agriculture offering four-year BSc Ag. (Hons.) degrees.

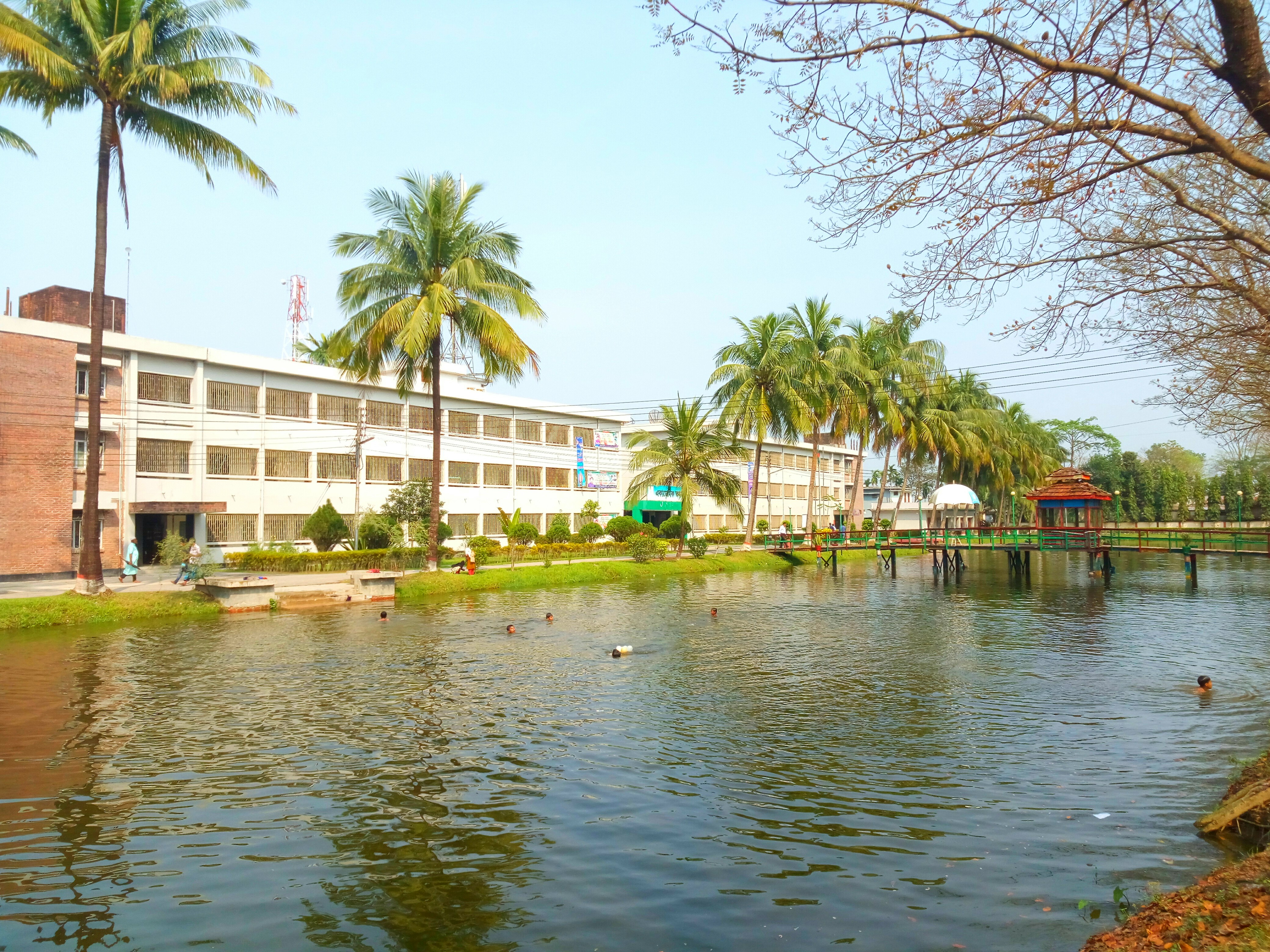
Academic building of main campus

The Patuakhali Science and Technology University was developed at the private initiative of the local people through the establishment of a higher secondary institute in 1972 as a private college. It was then turned to Patuakhali Agricultural College under the affiliation of Bangladesh Agricultural University (BAU), Mymensingh in 1979 with the objective of producing agricultural graduates offering the BSc.Ag. (Hons.) degree.

The college was nationalised on 1 February 1985 and was placed under the administrative control of the Bangladesh Agricultural Research Institute (BARI), Ministry of Agriculture together with BAU affiliation.

The government of Bangladesh launched a project to establish a science and technology university where none existed. The project advocated the transformation of Patuakhali Agricultural College into the full-fledged Patuakhali Science and Technology University that came into being through a parliamentary act passed on 12 July 2001.

== List of vice-chancellors ==
- Swadesh Chandra Samanta (17 May 2021–22 Aug 2024)
- Dr. Kazi Rafiqul Islam (2024–2026)
- Dr. S. M. Hemayet Jahan (2026–present)

== Administration ==
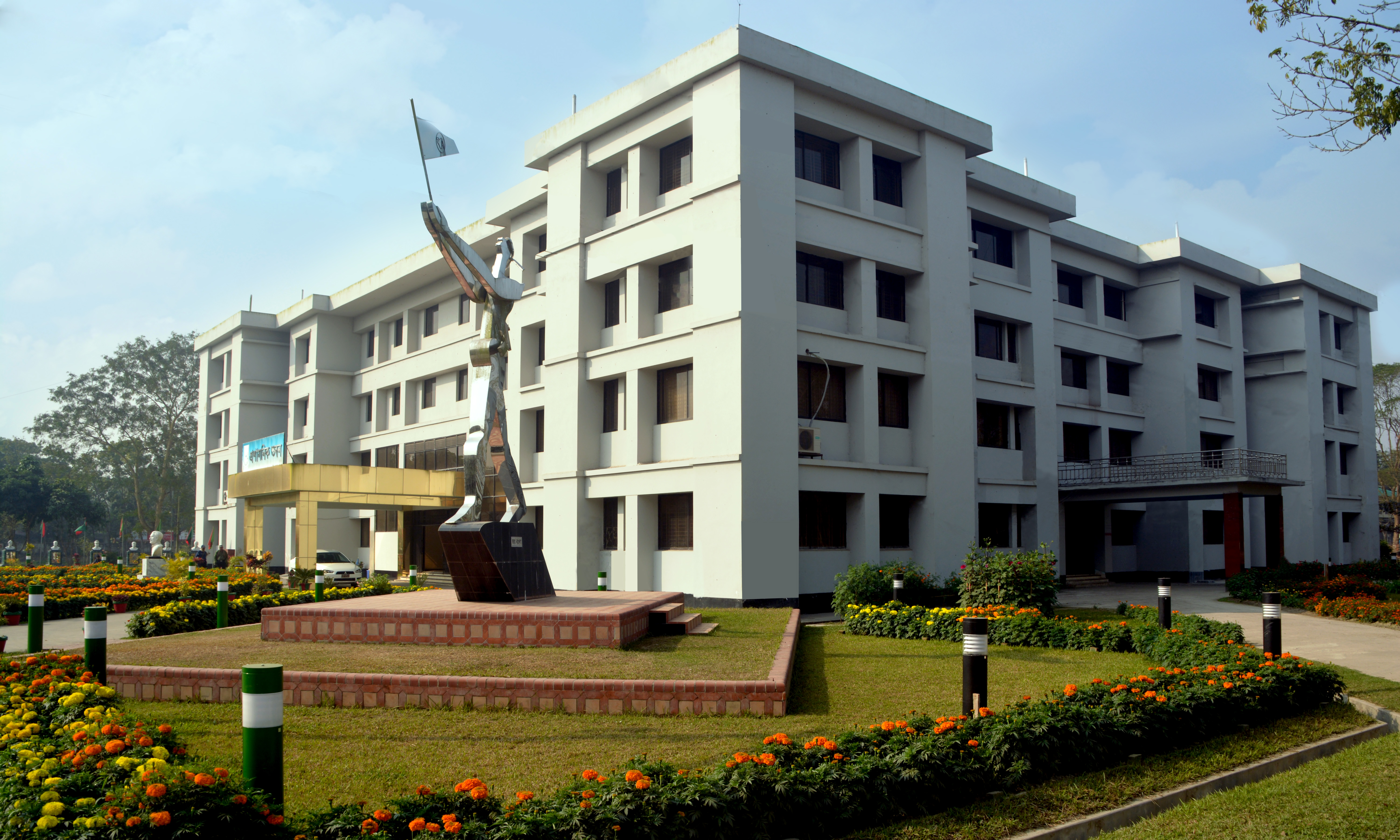
Administrative building, PSTU

Swadesh Chandra Samanta joined PSTU as vice-chancellor on 17 May 2021. Before joining as vice-chancellor, he was serving the Department of Agronomy of the Patuakhali Science and Technology University as professor and also as the Dean of Faculty of Agriculture of the same university.

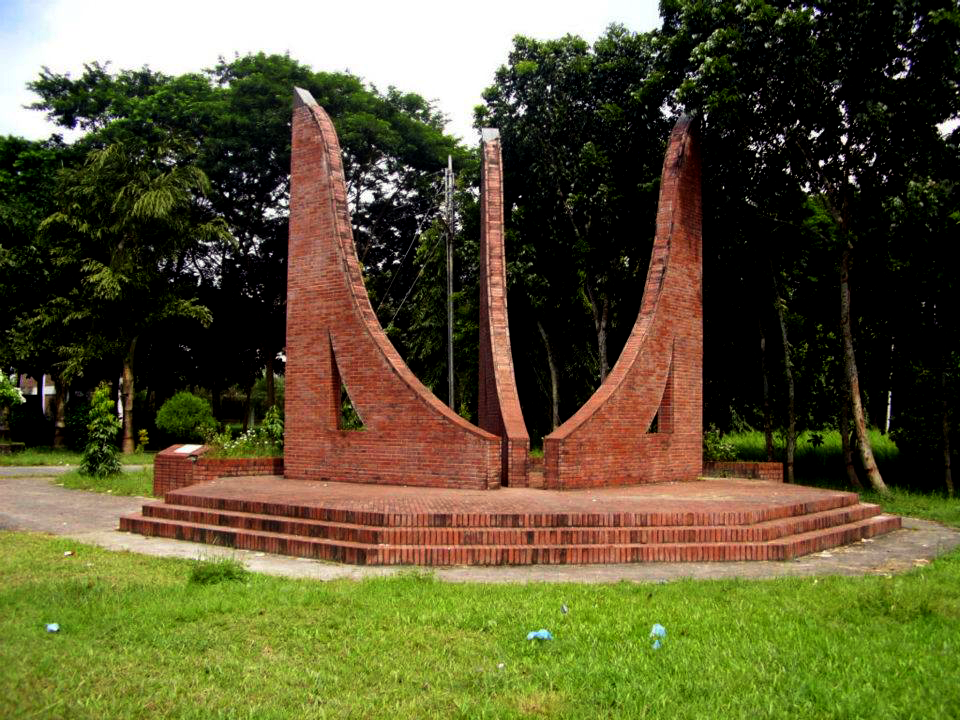
Shahid Minar

== Location ==
The PSTU campus is at Dumki Upazila under Patuakhali District. It is about 15 kilometres (9.3 mi) north of Patuakhali district town and can easily be reached by public transportation.

It has a compact campus with halls of residence within walking distance of the academic building. The main campus occupies 97.00 acres (39.25 ha) including a 37.00-acre (149,700 m^{2}) agricultural research farm. It has two campus. The main campus is located in Dumki Upazila under Patuakhali District and another is located in Babuganj Upazila under Barishal District.

With a view to establishing a Fisheries Faculty, it has a plan to acquire 200 acres (0.81 km^{2}) of land at Kuakata, the southernmost tourist resort of Bangladesh. This faculty will conduct research on fish covering inland and marine fisheries.

== Library ==
Central Library of Patuakhali University of Science and Technology, the largest library in Patuakhali district was established during the Agricultural College period. The current book collection of this library is around 45 thousand. The library is controlled and managed by Patuakhali Science and Technology University Authority. The library is a registered member of UGC Digital Library (UDL) Consortium and GesLiCoB (Library Consortium of Bangladesh -formerly known as INASP-PERI consortium), through which it has the facility to download e-journals and e-books of reputed international quality publishers. In addition, Open Athens Remote Access Service has been activated.Vision: Aspires to be a global knowledge hub to learn, share and create.

- Library Buildings and Sections:

The Paviprabi Library building has 4 floors. The erstwhile Agricultural College library is currently used as the central library of the university. First there was a two storied building, now it has been enlarged to a new 4 storied building which is being used as a library. The sections of this library are:1. Reading room 2. Newspaper Zone 3. Open Discussion Room 4. Reference Section 5. Sahitya Karnar (recommended) 6. Bangabandhu corner 7. Thesis corner 8. Digital Resource Access Center 9. CIRC - Agricultural Book Centre 10. Seminar room 11. Job Corner (Recommended) 12. Binding section 13. Circulation Section 14. Library Research Development Centre A baby care center for the children of female officers may be added in future so that they can perform their duties smoothly.

1. Classroom:

The reading room is located on the second floor of the library building. 200 people can sit together and study in it. All reading rooms are Wi-Fi enabled and air-conditioned. Besides, necessary and rare books are kept around the reading room for the students. They can read about it. But these books cannot be taken out. Carroll Services for Teachers aims to create an environment of focused study and research. There are separate rooms on the 4th floor for the study of teachers and faculty members.

2. Newspaper Zone: The newspaper zone on the ground floor has a total of 7 newspapers for students to read. Besides, the library also has old newspapers in its collection.

3. Open Discussion Room: The Open Discussion Room is located on the second floor of the old building. One day in every week, the Pathchakra is held here on the initiative of the university students.

4. Reference Section: Reference Section on 3rd Floor of the Library. Various theses, journals, term papers, reports are collected here for the research of teachers and students. Moreover, the library collection has access and download facility of e-journals and e-books of world renowned Emerald, JSTOR, IEEE, Wiley online Library, HINARI, AGORA, Research4Life.

Moreover, on the 3rd floor, the questions of all the exams of the university are kept.

5. Bangabandhu Corner: On one side of the second floor of the library is the Bangabandhu Corner. This corner is full of books on the great independence war of Bangladesh, history-tradition and the life and work of Bangabandhu. It contains books written by Bangabandhu, books related to Bangabandhu, books related to liberation war. The total number of books is 1338. Apart from books, videos, posters, documents and other documents related to Bangabandhu and liberation war are stored here.

6. Digital Resources Access Center:

Digital Resource Access Center has 8 computers. Through which anyone can avail the online facility. The library is a registered member of UGC Digital Library(UDL) Consortium and GesLiCoB (Library Consortium of Bangladesh -formerly known as INASP-PERI consortium), through which it has the facility to download e-journals and e-books of reputed international publishers. It has access to and download of e-journals and e-books of world renowned Emerald, JSTOR, IEEE, Wiley online Library, HINARI, AGORA, Research4Life. Moreover, there is Turn It In software for plagiarism checking. Which has access to teachers and students engaged in research.

7. Seminar Room (Recommended):

Although proposed, a room on the 4th floor of the library is currently working as a seminar room, equipped with projectors, sound boxes, chairs and tables.

8. SAARC Agricultural Center (SAC):

Patuakhali University of Science and Technology and SAARC Agricultural Center were inaugurated on 26 December 2021 through a Memorandum of Understanding. It is equipped with textbooks gifted from SAC. The number of books is 138.

9. Binding Section:

The library has a binding and repair wing to preserve books that have become unusable due to heavy use. Various administrative binding works of the university are completed.

10. Circulation Section:

This branch has been tirelessly providing library services by exchanging books among students, teachers, officers and employees. Open Access system is in operation to facilitate checking the need of books from this department. Books are issued through library cards.

- Manpower :

Library work is being completed with 8 officers and 17 employees totaling 25 people. Each floor has a floor in-charge. Pankaj Kumar is currently serving as the chief librarian. He has been serving in this position since 2019. Prior to this, Md. Anwar Hossain has served since the establishment of the university.

- Collection :

Total collection of library materials as on 30 June 2023 AD: 30487 books, 3048 journals, 2432 periodicals, 282 PhD theses, 2882 TMS theses, 789 MBA reports, 1357 BBA internship reports, 440 CSE internship reports, 670 Disaster Management InternshipsReport, there are 425 Food Science Internship Reports and 312 Fisheries Internship Reports.Moreover, there is a significant collection of ebooks and e-journals online. The books are numbered according to the subject in duodecimal system, so that the books can be easily found.

- Collaboration:

Patuakhali University of Science and Technology is working together through MoU with Vidyasagar University, India, and Bengal Library Association to maintain international standards. Moreover, work is going on for collaboration with IIT Kharagpur.

- Inspection:

The Central Library has a Visiting Office. If a respected person visits, he signs the inspection form. Those who visited include SAARC Director, VCs and professors from various universities, members of Bangladesh Accreditation Council.

- Archive:

University Central Library archive contains old newspapers, Agricultural College information, Academic Council records.

== Academic ==
Faculty of Agriculture

- Agricultural Botany
- Agricultural Chemistry
- Agricultural Engineering
- Agricultural Extension and Rural Development
- Agroforestry
- Agronomy
- Animal Science
- Biotechnology and Genetic Engineering
- Entomology
- Genetics and Plant Breeding
- Horticulture
- Plant Pathology
- Soil Science
- Statistics
- Climate Smart Agriculture

Faculty of Computer Science and Engineering

- Computer and Communication Engineering
- Computer Science and Information Technology
- Electrical and Electronics Engineering
- Mathematics
- Physics and Mechanical Engineering

Faculty of Business Administration

- Accounting and Information Systems
- Economics and Sociology
- Finance and Banking
- Language and Communication
- Management Studies
- Marketing

Faculty of Fisheries

- Aquaculture
- Fisheries Biology and Genetics
- Fisheries Management
- Fisheries Technology
- Marine Fisheries and Oceanography

Faculty of Animal Science and Veterinary Medicine

- Department of Anatomy and Histology
- Department of Animal Products and By-Products Technology
- Department of Basic Science
- Department of Dairy Science
- Department of General Animal Science and Animal Nutrition
- Department of Genetics and Animal Breeding
- Department of Medicine, Surgery and Obstetrics
- Department of Microbiology and Public Health
- Department of Pathology and Parasitology
- Department of Physiology and Pharmacology
- Department of Poultry Science

Faculty of Environmental Science and Disaster Management

- Disaster Resilience and Engineering
- Disaster Risk Management
- Emergency Management
- Environmental Science
- Geo Information Science and Earth Observation

Faculty of Nutrition and Food Science

- Biochemistry and Food Analysis
- Community Health and Hygiene
- Environmental Sanitation
- Food Microbiology
- Food Technology and Engineering
- Human Nutrition and Dietetics
- Post Harvest Technology and Marketing

Faculty of Law and Land Administration

- Law and Land Administration

Faculty of Engineering

- Electrical and Electronics Engineering

Faculty of Marnie Fisheries and Oceanography

- Marine Fisheries and Oceanography

== Residential student halls ==
For the male students

- Bijoy 24 Hall(Main Campus)
- Shahid Ziaur Rahman Hall-1(Main Campus)
- Shahid Ziaur Rahman Hall-2(Main Campus)
- M. Keramot Ali Hall(Main Campus)
- Birshrestho Captain Mohiuddin Jahangir Hall (Babuganj Campus)
- Sher -E- Bangla Hall (Under construction Main Campus)

For the female students

- Taposhi Rabeya Hall (Main Campus)
- Sultana Rojiya Hall (Babuganj Campus)
- Kobi Begum Sufia Kamal Hall(Main Campus)
- No Proposed Name Yet(Under construction Main Campus)

== See also ==
- Mukta Bangla
- Busts of the Seven Bir Sreshtho
