= Kuakata (disambiguation) =

Kuakata is a town in Bangladesh. It may also refer to:

- Kuakata Beach, a sea beach in Bangladesh
- Kuakata Ecopark, an eco-park in Bangladesh
- Kuakata National Park, a reserved forest in Bangladesh
