= Andharmanik =

Andharmanik may refer to:

- Andharmanik, Bakerganj, village in Bakerganj Upazila
- Andharmanik, Mehendiganj, village in Mehendiganj Upazila
- Andharmanik River, river in Bangladesh
