= Kalapara Municipality =

Kalapara
- Town
- Location of Kalapara in Bangladesh
- Coordinates: 21.984877°N 90.231502°E
- Country: Bangladesh
- Division: Barisal Division
- District: Patuakhali District
- Upazila: Kalapara Upazila
- Municipal Town: 2010
- Upazila Headquarters: 1984

Government
  - Type: Municipality
  - Body: Kalapara Municipality
  - Mayor: ASM Rakibul Ahsan

Area
  - Total: 23.24 km^{2} (8.97 sq mi)

Population
  - Total: 16,916
  - Density: 727.9/km^{2} (1,885/sq mi)
- Time zone: UTC+6 (BST)

Kalapara Municipality mahallah geocode map

Kalapara is a town in Patuakhali District under Barisal Division, Bangladesh. It is the headquarters of Kalapara Upazila. It is the second largest town in Patuakhali District and the largest and principal urban center of Kalapara Upazila. The town is situated on the bank of the Andharmanik River. The nearest international and domestic airports to the town are Hazrat Shahjalal International Airport and Patuakhali Airport, respectively. Kalapara town is located 91.6 km away from the divisional city of Barisal and 50 km away from the district town of Patuakhali.

== Population ==
The total population of Kalapara town is 26,177, of which 13,342 are males and 12,835 are females. The male-to-female ratio is 104:100. There are a total of 6,492 households in the town.

== Geography ==
The geographical coordinates of the town are 21.984877°N 90.231502°E. The average elevation of the town is 9 meters above sea level.

== Administration ==
In 2010, to provide civic services and other facilities for the residents of Kalapara town, a local government body called Kalapara Municipality was formed. It is divided into 9 wards and 24 mahallas. Out of the total area of 23.24 square km, 3.75 square km of Kalapara town is governed by the Kalapara Municipality.

== Education ==
The literacy rate of Kalapara town is 65.5%.
