= Nilganj River =

Coordinates: 21°58′N 90°16′E

Location
- Country: Bangladesh
- District: Patuakhali
- Upazila: Kalapara

Physical characteristics
- Mouth
  - location: Andharmanik River

The Nilganj River is a river in Bangladesh. It is one of the major rivers of Kalapara Upazila in Patuakhali District, and flows into the Andharmanik River.
