= Submarine cable landing station, Patuakhali =

Submarine Cable Landing Station
- Founded: 2017
- Headquarters: Dhaka, Bangladesh
- Products: Telecommunication services, Submarine cable operator, International Internet Gateway (IIG), Internet Service Provider (ISP)
- Website: www.bsccl.com

Bangladesh Submarine Cable Landing Station, Patuakhali is an autonomous institution under Bangladesh Submarine Cable Company Limited (BSCCL), which is controlled by the Ministry of Posts, Telecommunications and Information Technology of the Government of Bangladesh. It is one of the principal telecommunication service providers in Bangladesh. This is the second submarine cable landing station of the country's only international submarine cable operator.

== History ==
Bangladesh’s second submarine cable landing station, operated by Bangladesh Submarine Cable Company Limited (BSCCL), is a state-owned public limited company under the Ministry of Posts and Telecommunications. BSCCL is a member of the international submarine cable consortia SEA-ME-WE 4 and SEA-ME-WE 5, which ensure higher capacity and sufficient availability of submarine cables in Bangladesh. Through SEA-ME-WE 4 and SEA-ME-WE 5, Bangladesh’s internet and international voice traffic are carried. BSCCL’s cable landing station for SEA-ME-WE 4 is located in Cox’s Bazar, while the landing station for SEA-ME-WE 5 has been established at Kuakata in Patuakhali District.

The international consortium South East Asia–Middle East–Western Europe (SEA-ME-WE 5), comprising telecommunication companies from 19 countries, built this cable with Japan’s NEC and France’s Alcatel-Lucent. Its total length is 20,000 km. From Kuakata beach, Bangladesh, is connected to the main cable via a branch cable.

The second submarine cable landing station was built in 2013 on 10 acres of land in Maitbhanga village, Kuakata, Patuakhali District, for 6.6 billion BDT. After completion, the test of internet transmission started in March 2017. A 25,000 km long cable line, running under the deep sea from Europe to Singapore, was connected to this station at Kuakata through the Bay of Bengal. Through this International Internet Gateway (IIG), 1500 gigabytes per second of data transmission is provided.

== See also ==
- Submarine communications cable
- Bangladesh Communication Satellite Company Limited
- Bangladesh Hi-Tech Park Authority
- Bangladesh Submarine Cable Company Limited
