= Kalapara Upazila =

Kalapara কলাপাড়া Khepupara
- Upazila
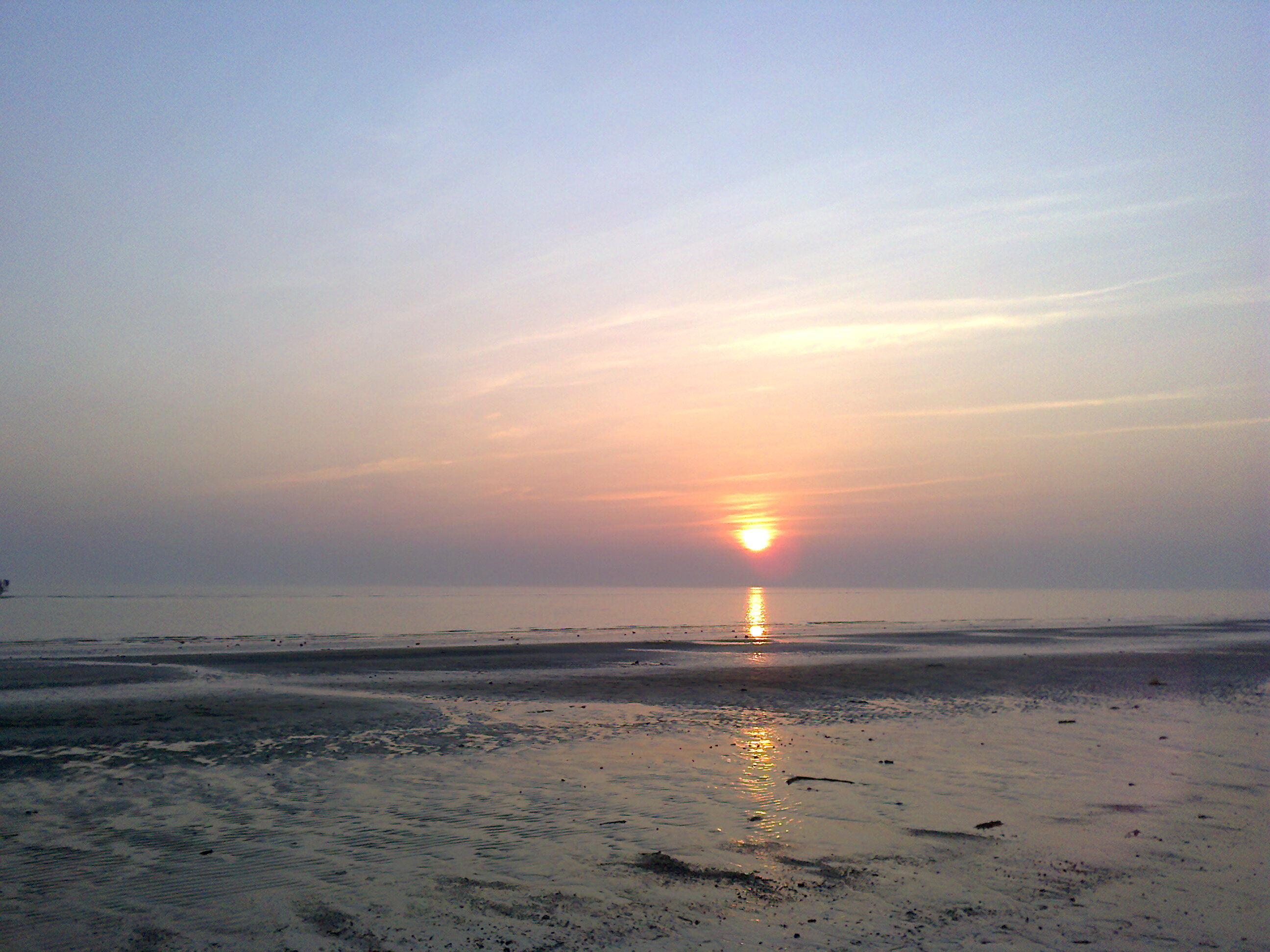
- Kuakata Ecopark

- Coordinates: 21°59.2′N 90°14.5′E
- Country: Bangladesh
- Division: Barisal Division
- District: Patuakhali District
- Headquarters: Kalapara

Government

Area
  - Total: 491.89 km^{2} (189.92 sq mi)

Population (2022)
  - Total: 286,993
  - Density: 583.45/km^{2} (1,511.1/sq mi)
- Time zone: UTC+6 (BST)
- Postal code: 8650
- Area code: 04425

Kalapara Upazila mauza geocode map

Kalapara Upazila (Bengali: কলাপাড়া উপজেলা), also known as Khepupara (Bengali: খেপুপাড়া) is an upazila of Patuakhali District in Barisal, Bangladesh.

== History ==
The Rakhine tribe of Bangladesh first settled in this upazila. A section of the people belonging to the Buddhist Rakhine tribe of Arakan came to this upazila in quest of better living and first settled at Khepupara and Kuakata. Tradition goes that the Rakhines on excavating wells traced fresh water in the area and thereby settled there. The Rakhine word 'kansai' means 'beach of fate'. The place was named as Kansai after this. The place was subsequently renamed as Kuakata (digging of well) after the wells dug out by the Rakhines. The upazila though named as Kalapara, the upazila sadar is known as Khepupara. It is said that two influential Rakhine chiefs used to reside on either side of a canal running northsouth through the upazila, Kalau Magh on the eastern bank and Khepu Magh on the western side. The habitation on eastern bank of the canal was named as Kalapara after the name of Kalau Magh and that on the western bank as Khepupara after Khepu Magh.

== Geography ==
Kalapara is located at 21.9861°N 90.2422°E. It has 31324 households and total area 483.08 km^{2}. The major rivers are the Andharmanik, Nilganj, and Dhankhali.

=== Climate ===
Climate data for Khepupara (1991–2020, extremes 1973-present)
| Month | Jan | Feb | Mar | Apr | May | Jun | Jul | Aug | Sep | Oct | Nov | Dec | Year |
|---|---|---|---|---|---|---|---|---|---|---|---|---|---|
| Record high °C (°F) | 32.1 (89.8) | 35.5 (95.9) | 39.4 (102.9) | 40.0 (104.0) | 38.1 (100.6) | 36.7 (98.1) | 36.1 (97.0) | 36.0 (96.8) | 37.1 (98.8) | 37.7 (99.9) | 34.2 (93.6) | 31.2 (88.2) | 40.0 (104.0) |
| Mean daily maximum °C (°F) | 25.9 (78.6) | 29.1 (84.4) | 32.3 (90.1) | 33.3 (91.9) | 33.3 (91.9) | 32.0 (89.6) | 31.0 (87.8) | 31.2 (88.2) | 31.5 (88.7) | 31.6 (88.9) | 29.8 (85.6) | 27.0 (80.6) | 30.7 (87.3) |
| Daily mean °C (°F) | 18.6 (65.5) | 22.2 (72.0) | 26.5 (79.7) | 28.8 (83.8) | 29.5 (85.1) | 29.2 (84.6) | 28.6 (83.5) | 28.6 (83.5) | 28.5 (83.3) | 27.5 (81.5) | 24.1 (75.4) | 20.0 (68.0) | 26.0 (78.8) |
| Mean daily minimum °C (°F) | 13.2 (55.8) | 16.7 (62.1) | 21.6 (70.9) | 24.8 (76.6) | 25.9 (78.6) | 26.4 (79.5) | 26.1 (79.0) | 26.1 (79.0) | 25.8 (78.4) | 24.3 (75.7) | 19.8 (67.6) | 15.0 (59.0) | 22.1 (71.8) |
| Record low °C (°F) | 7.7 (45.9) | 9.4 (48.9) | 13.0 (55.4) | 18.0 (64.4) | 19.1 (66.4) | 18.0 (64.4) | 20.3 (68.5) | 21.6 (70.9) | 19.0 (66.2) | 18.2 (64.8) | 13.6 (56.5) | 8.4 (47.1) | 7.7 (45.9) |
| Average precipitation mm (inches) | 8 (0.3) | 21 (0.8) | 44 (1.7) | 98 (3.9) | 235 (9.3) | 418 (16.5) | 448 (17.6) | 360 (14.2) | 295 (11.6) | 192 (7.6) | 41 (1.6) | 7 (0.3) | 2,167 (85.3) |
| Average precipitation days (≥ 1.0 mm) | 1 | 2 | 3 | 5 | 12 | 20 | 25 | 25 | 19 | 11 | 3 | 1 | 127 |
| Average relative humidity (%) | 76 | 75 | 76 | 79 | 81 | 86 | 88 | 87 | 87 | 85 | 81 | 78 | 82 |
| Mean monthly sunshine hours | 220.9 | 222.3 | 239.8 | 229.7 | 211.4 | 145.2 | 142.4 | 141.3 | 156.5 | 204.7 | 218.6 | 217.0 | 2,349.8 |
Source 1: NOAA
Source 2: Bangladesh Meteorological Department (humidity 1981—2010)

== Demographics ==
Religions in Kalapara Upazila (2022)
| Religion | Percent |
| Islam | 95.03% |
| Hinduism | 4.21% |
| Buddhism | 0.40% |
| Other or not stated | 0.36% |

According to the 2022 Bangladeshi census, Kalapara Upazila had 70,430 households and a population of 286,993. 10.05% of the population were under 5 years of age. Kalapara had a literacy rate (age 7 and over) of 80.10%: 81.04% for males and 79.14% for females, and a sex ratio of 102.34 males for every 100 females. 63,148 (22.00%) lived in urban areas.

According to the 2011 Census of Bangladesh, Kalapara Upazila had 57,525 households and a population of 237,831. 56,870 (19.94%) were under 10 years of age. Kalapara has a literacy rate (age 7 and over) of 52.0%, compared to the national average of 51.8%, and a sex ratio of 993 females per 1,000 males. 35,354 (14.87%) lived in urban areas.

According to the 1991 Bangladesh census, Kalapara has a population of 174,921. Males constituted 50.89% of the population, and females constituted the remainder 49.11%. This upazila's eighteen-up population was 82,394. Kalapara has an average literacy rate of 34.9% (7+ years), compared to the national average which was 32.4% literate.

== Administration ==
Kalapara thana was established in 1921 and was turned into an upazila in 1983.

Kalapara Upazila is divided into Kalapara Municipality, Kuakata Municipality, and 12 union parishads: Baliatali, Chakamaia, Champapur, Dalbugonj, Dhankhali, Dulaser, Lalua, Latachapli, Mahipur, Mihagonj, Nilgonj, and Tiakhali. The union parishads are subdivided into 58 mauzas and 239 villages.

Kalapara Municipality and Kuakata Municipality are each subdivided into 9 wards.

The area of the town is 19.49 km^{2}. It has a population of 16,330; males constituted 55.18%, females constituted 44.82%. The density of population is 838 per km^{2}. The literacy rate among the town people is 39.37%. The town has one bungalow.

== Points of interest ==
Kuakata Buddhist Vihara, Kapradanga Buddhist Math (dilapidated), Mistripara Buddhist Vihara (dilapidated).

- Kuakata, a sea beach offering decent views of the Bay of Bengal
- Fort of Kachimkhali Village in Chakamaya Union
- Earthen Fort of Newapara Village in Chakamaya Union
- Mohipur (Fishing Boat)
- Buddhist site of Mishripara at Kuataka
- Gangamatir Char
- Kaurar Char
- Submarine cable landing station

== Religious institutions ==
There are 275 mosques and 41 temples and 8 Buddhist sites, 2 churches and 1 mazar. Notable institutions include:

- Kalapara Jame Masjid
- Kuakata Buddhist Vihara
- Mazar of Pir Bashiruddin.

== Notable people ==
- Moazzem Hossain, Second MP in Independent Bangladesh in 1979 Bangladeshi general election

== See also ==
- Upazilas of Bangladesh
- Districts of Bangladesh
- Divisions of Bangladesh
- Administrative geography of Bangladesh
