= Dhankhali River =

Coordinates: 21.992°N 90.293°E

The Dhankhali River is located in Bangladesh. It is one of the major rivers of Kalapara Upazila in Patuakhali District, and flows into the Rabnabad Channel.
