= Patuakhali Airport =

Naval airbase in Patuakhali, Bangladesh

Coordinates: 22°22′33″N 090°19′20″E

- IATA: none; ICAO: none

Summary
- Owner: Civil Aviation Authority of Bangladesh
- Operator: Bangladesh Navy
- Serves: Patuakhali, Kuakata
- Location: Bangladesh

Map
- Location within Bangladesh

Runways
Direction	Length		Surface
Direction	ft	m	Surface
17/35	1,968	600	Asphalt
- Source: Landings.com

Patuakhali Airport is an airfield in Patuakhali District, Barisal Division, in the south of Bangladesh. It was built to serve the tourist attraction of Kuakata, and it provided significant assistance with flood relief after Cyclone Sidr in 2007.

Currently, it is one of the unused airports of Bangladesh. It was not fully constructed because of insufficient funds. But as the pressure of tourists seeking to visit Kuakata has increased, the Patuakhali authorities have been considering completing the construction of the airport. It is currently under the control of the Bangladesh Navy, for which it serves as an emergency runway, but in the future it could be used as a civilian airport.

== See also ==
- List of airports in Bangladesh
