= Andharmanik, Mehendiganj =

Andharmanik আন্ধারমাণিক
- Village
- Location in Bangladesh
- Coordinates: 22°54′N 90°30′E
- Country: Bangladesh
- Division: Barisal Division
- District: Barisal District
- Upazila: Mehendiganj Upazila

Population (2022)
  - Total: 9,697
- Time zone: UTC+6 (Bangladesh Time)

Andharmanik is a village in Mehendiganj Upazila of Barisal District in the Barisal Division of southern-central Bangladesh.

== Demographic ==
According to the 2022 Census of Bangladesh, Andharmanik had 2,313 households and a population of 9,697.
