= Andharmanik, Bakerganj =

Andharmanik আন্ধারমাণিক
- Village
- Location in Bangladesh
- Coordinates: 22.599°N 90.506°E
- Country: Bangladesh
- Division: Barisal Division
- District: Barisal District
- Upazila: Bakerganj Upazila

Population (2022)
  - Total: 1,150
- Time zone: UTC+6 (Bangladesh Time)

Andharmanik is a village in Bakerganj Upazila of Barisal District in the Barisal Division of southern-central Bangladesh.

According to the 2022 Census of Bangladesh, Andharmanik had 282 households and a population of 1,150.
