= Kuakata National Park =

National park of Bangladesh

- IUCN category II (national park)
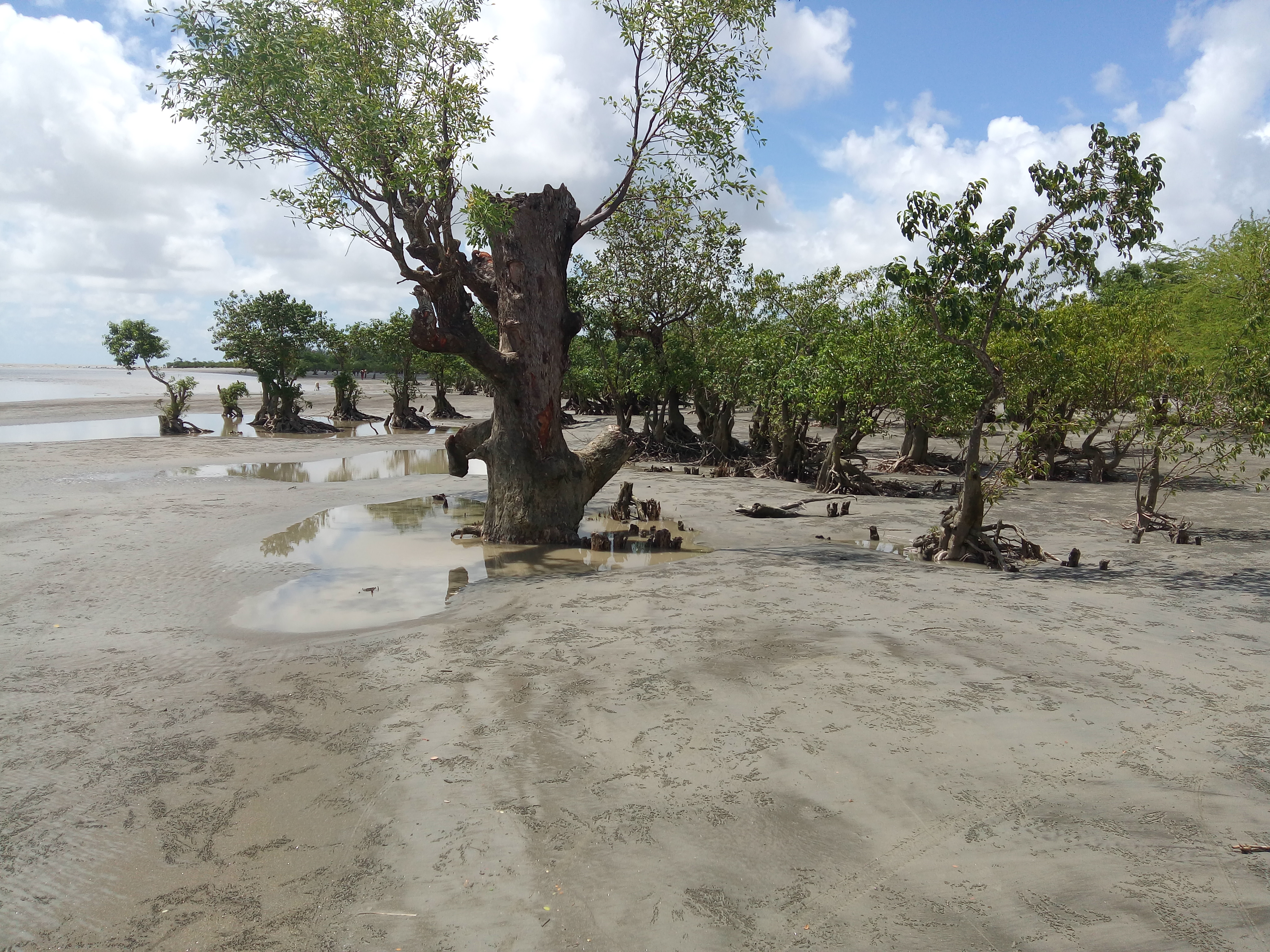
- Interactive map of Kuakata National Park
- Location: Patuakhali, Bangladesh
- Coordinates: 21.853960°N 90.090764°E
- Area: 1,613 ha (3,990 acres)
- Established: 24 October 2010

Kuakata National Park (Bengali: কুয়াকাটা জাতীয় উদ্যান) is IUCN Category II national park and nature reserve in Bangladesh. The park is located at Kalapara Upazila under Patuakhali District. It has been declared as one of the safe zones for vultures as per the Vulture Safe Zone-2 Schedule of the government of Bangladesh.

The park was officially declared as a national park by the government of Bangladesh on 24 October 2010 for the purpose of conservation of flora, fauna, nature and development of tourism facilities. It covers an area of 1613 hectares.
