= Kuakata =

Kuakata কুয়াকাটা
- Town
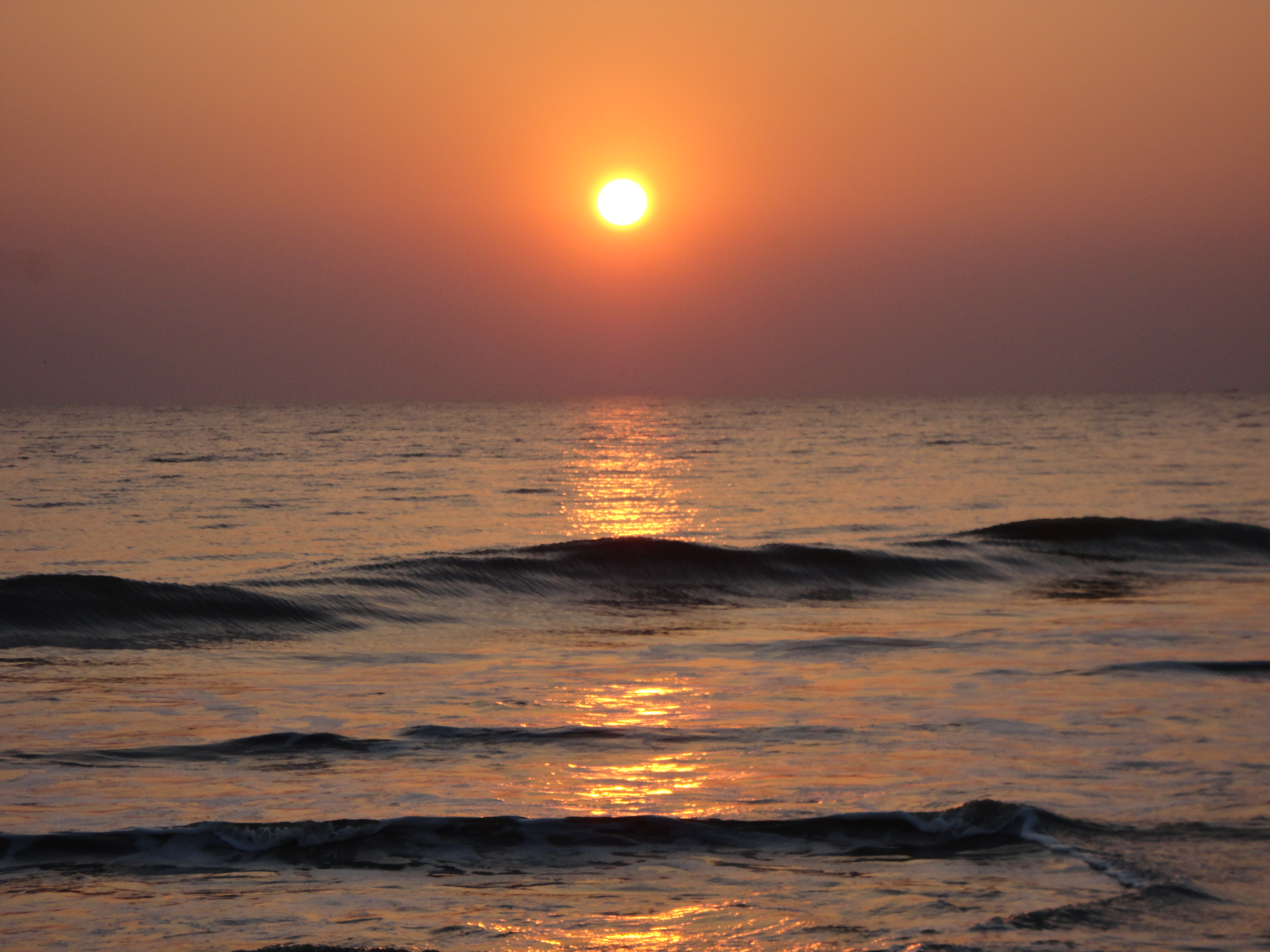
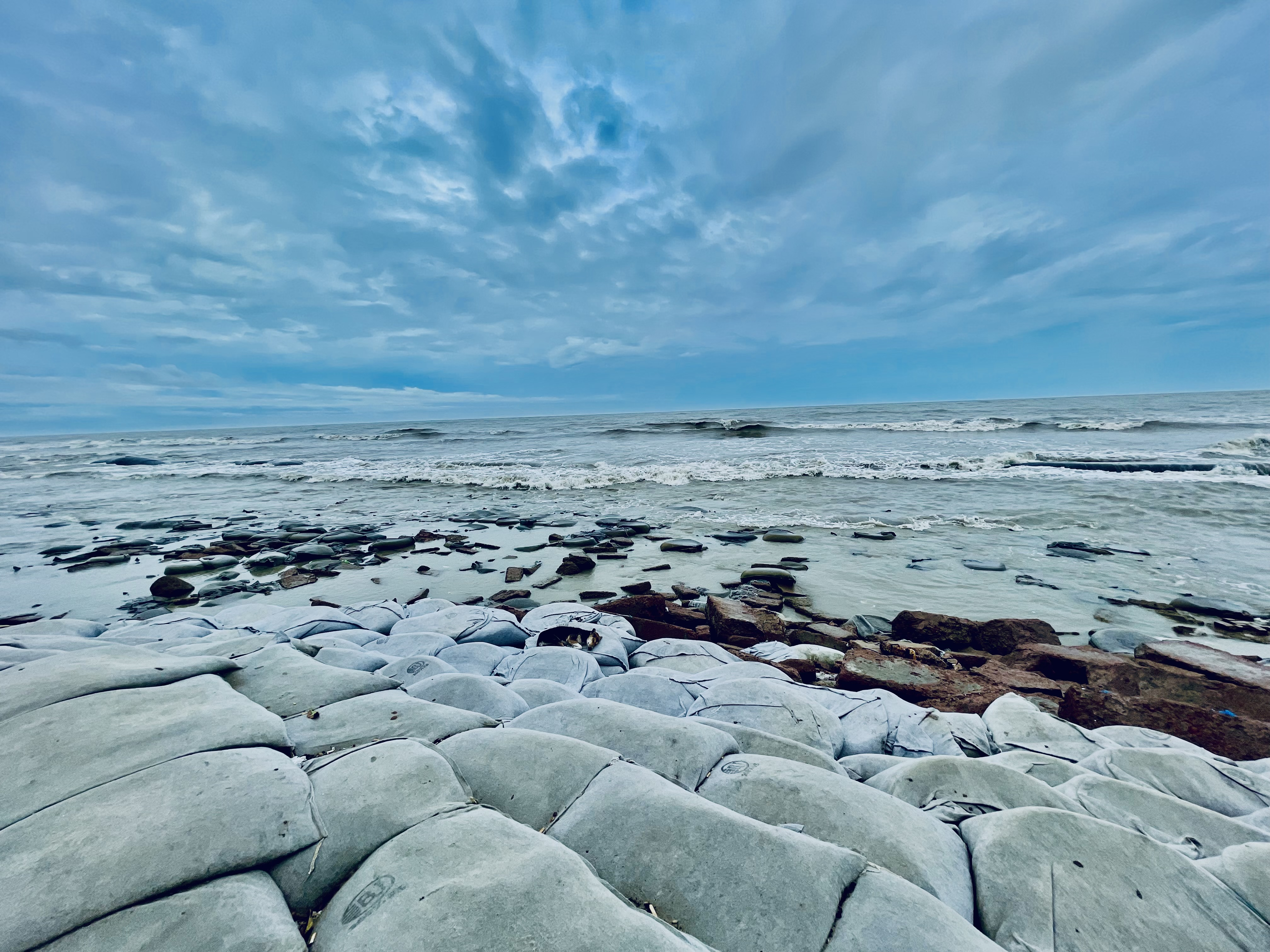
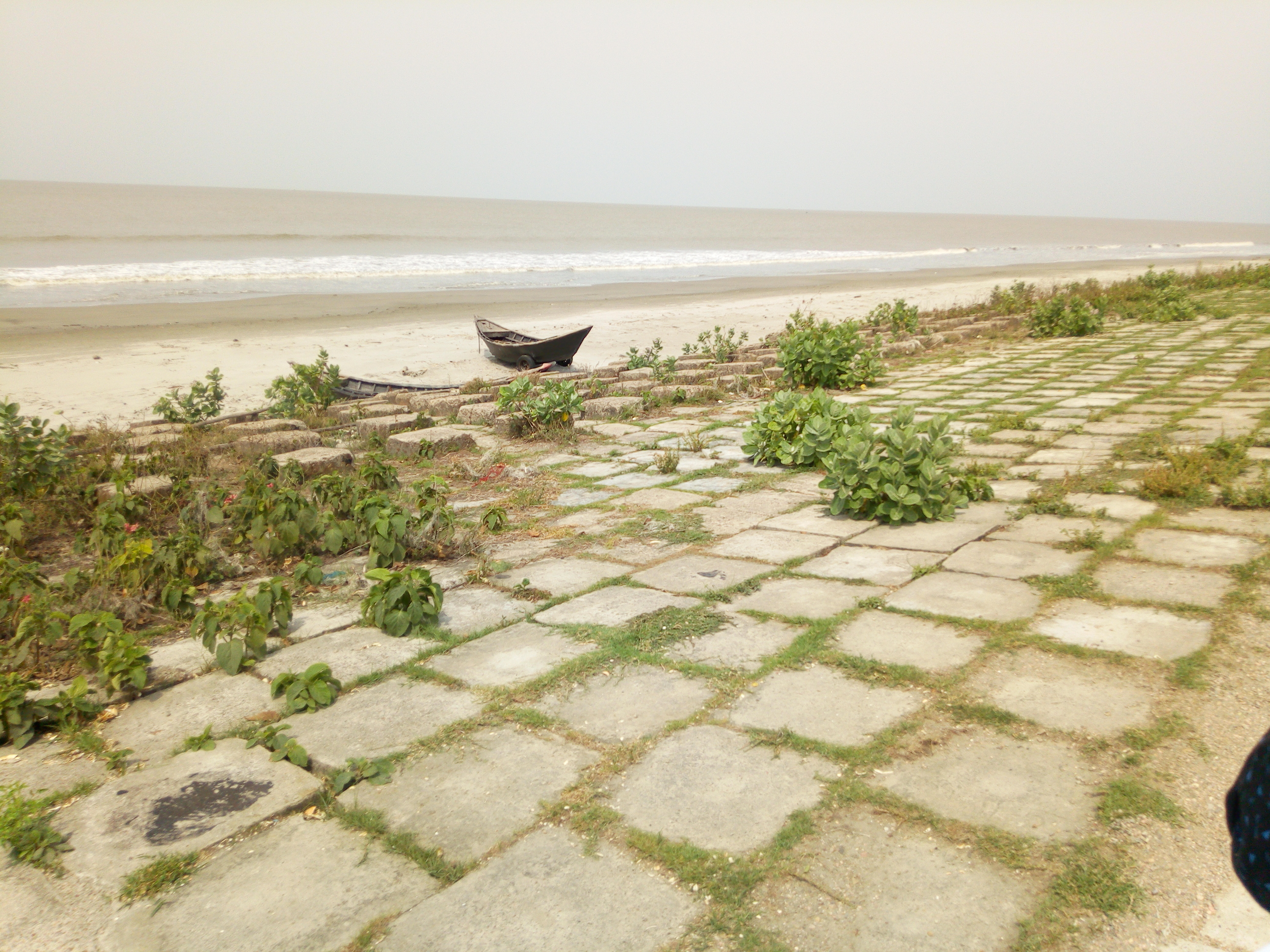
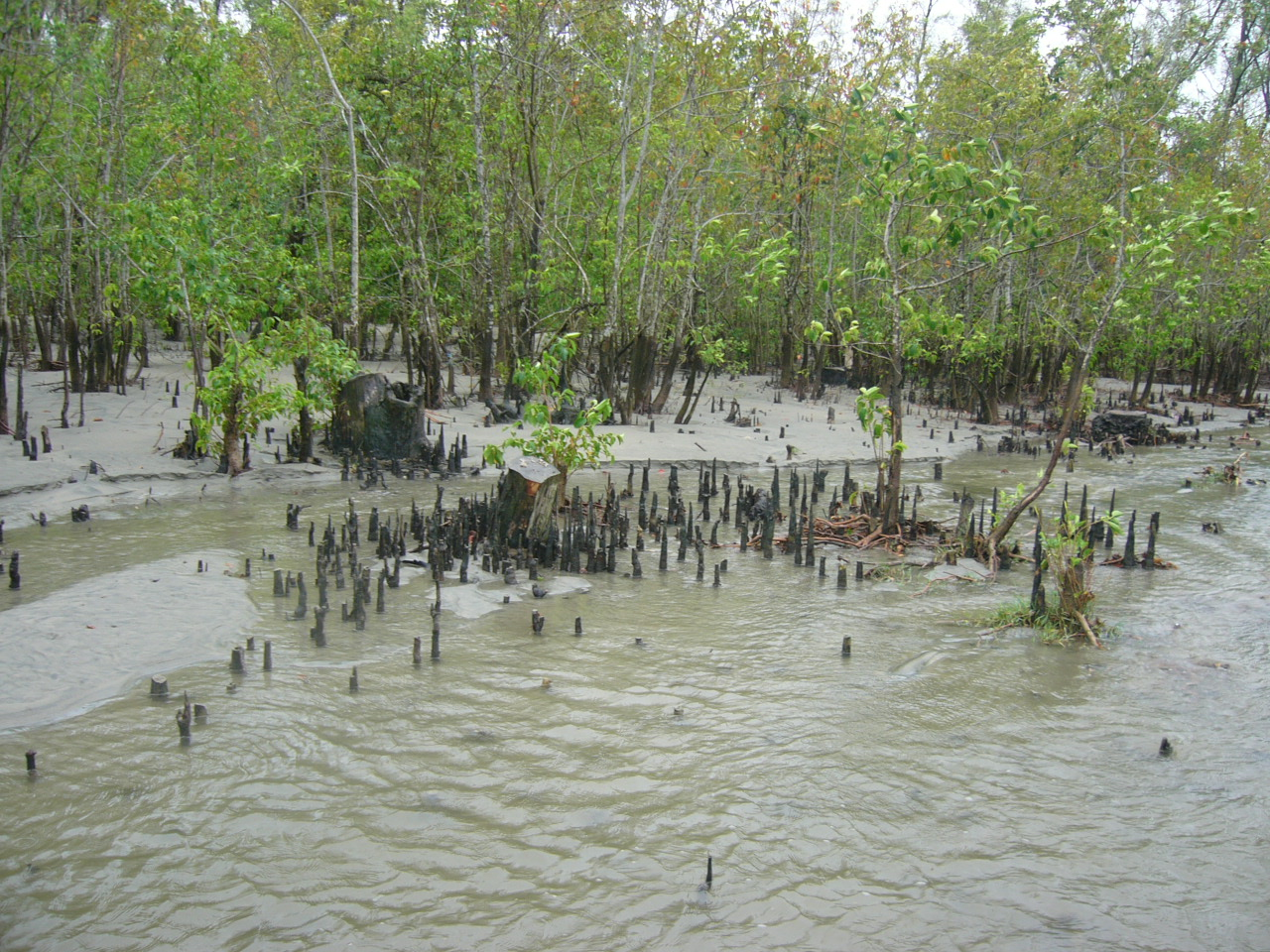
- Bay of Bengal, Kuakata beach and Sundarbans Mangrove Forest
- Nickname: Daughter of Sea (সাগরকন্যা)
- Location within Barisal division Location within Bangladesh
- Coordinates: 21°49′16″N 90°07′11″E
- Country: Bangladesh
- Division: Barisal Division
- District: Patuakhali District
- Upazila: Kalapara

Area
  - Total: 11.34 km^{2} (4.38 sq mi)

Population
  - Total: 13,657
- Time zone: UTC+6 (BST)
- Postal code: 8652

Kuakata Municipality mahallah geocode map

Kuakata (Bengali: কুয়াকাটা) is a town of Patuakhali located in southern Bangladesh known for its panoramic sea beach. Kuakata beach is a sandy expanse 18 kilometres (11 mi) long and 3 kilometres (1.9 mi) wide. The beach offers unobstructed views of both the sunrise and sunset over the Bay of Bengal.

== Etymology ==
The name Kuakata originated from the word 'kua' — the Bengali word for "well" which was dug on the seashore by the early Rakhine settlers (Burmese tribes) in quest of collecting drinking water. They landed on the Kuakata coast in the late 18th century after being expelled from Arakan (Myanmar) by the Burmese extremists. Afterwards, it has become a tradition of digging wells in the neighbourhoods of Rakhaine tribes for water.

== Geography ==
Kuakata is situated in Kalapara Upazila, Patuakhali District. It is about 320 kilometres (200 mi) south of Dhaka, the capital, and about 70 kilometres (43 mi) from the district headquarters.

== Demographics ==
According to the 2011 Bangladesh census, Kuakata had 2,065 households and a population of 9,077.

== Culture ==
Kuakata Beach

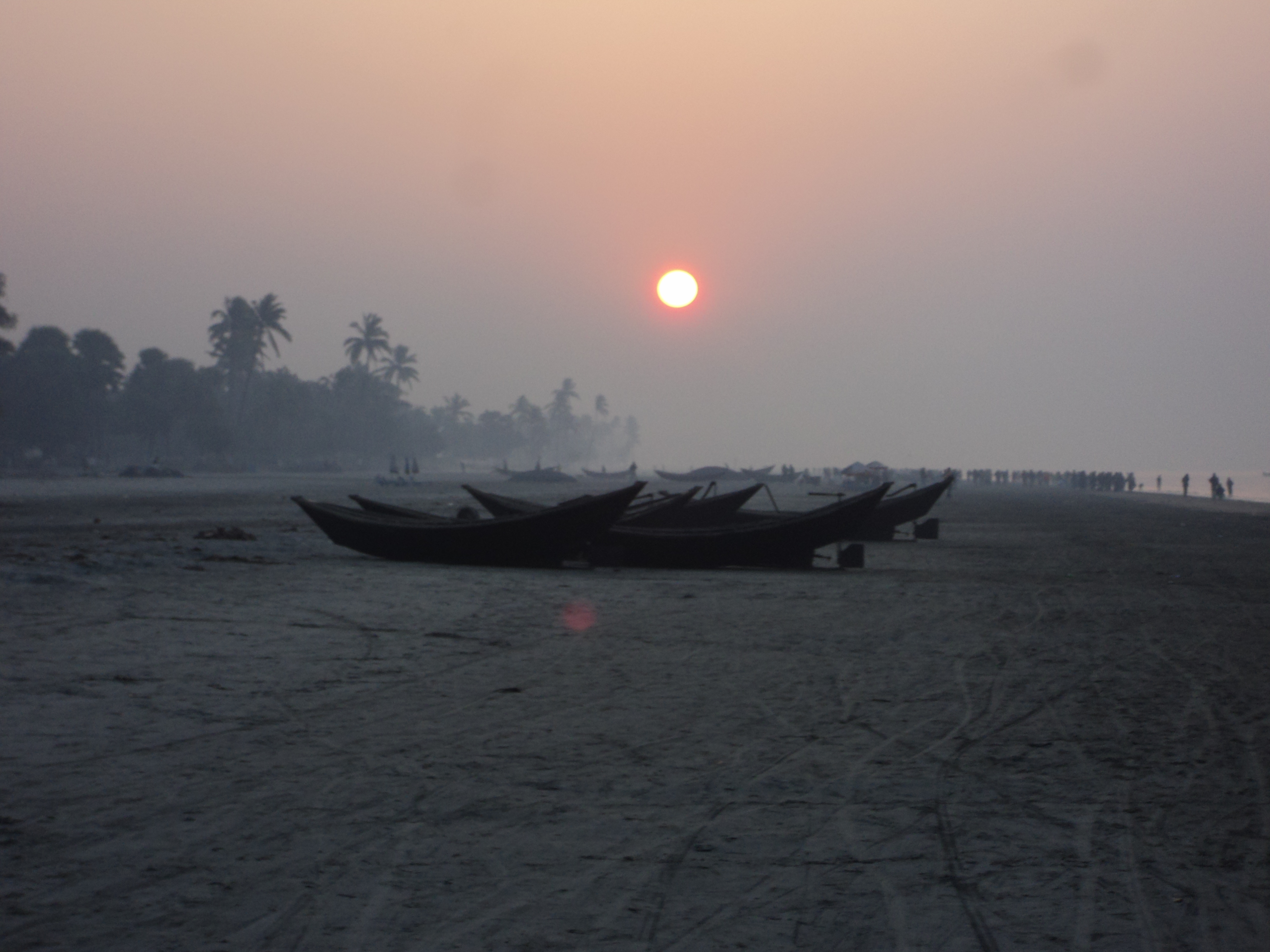
Sunrise at Kuakata beach

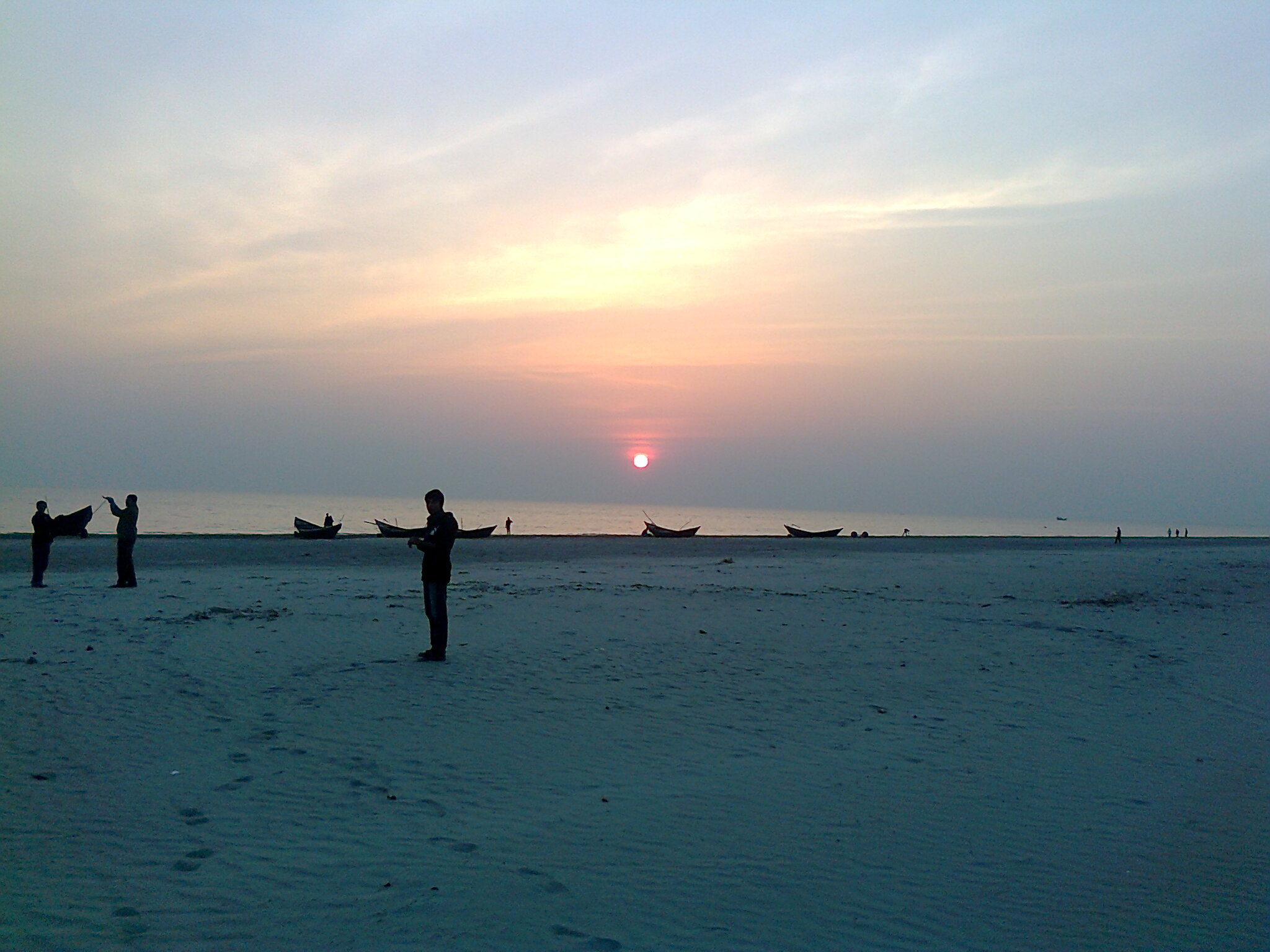
Sunset at Kuakata beach

Kuakata is a place of pilgrimage for Hindu and Buddhist communities. Innumerable devotees arrive here at the festivals of 'Rush Purnima' and 'Maghi Purnima'. On these occasions the pilgrims take holy baths at the bay and participate in the traditional fairs. One may visit a 100-year-old Buddhist temple where the statue of Goutama Buddha and two 200-year-old wells are located.

== Tourism ==
The town Kuakata has sea beach named Kuakata Beach. Many tourists visit the place to see the beach although it hasn’t international recognition like Cox's Bazar Beach but it is popular in Bangladesh. There are many places tourist visit such as:

- Kuakata National Park
- Kuakata Ecopark
- Forest of Fatra: The protected mangrove forest on the western side of the beach is known as the 'second Sundarban'
- Well of Kuakata: At the beginning of Rakhine village Keranipara near Kuakata Beach is an ancient well near a Buddhist monastery.
- Shima Buddhist Monastery: In front of the ancient well is the ancient Seema Buddhist Vihara, which contains a meditating Buddha image made of Ashta dhatu weighing about thirty-seven maunds.
- Rakhine settlement of Keranipara: Keranipara, the village of the ethnic Rakhine people, begins in front of Seema Buddhist Vihar;
- Alipur Port: About four kilometers north of Kuakata is Alipur Mohipur, one of the largest fishing centers in the southern region;
- Mishripara Buddhist Monastery: About eight kilometers east of Kuakata beach, Misripara, home to Rakhine tribes, has a Buddhist monastery that houses the largest Buddhist statue in the subcontinent.
- Forest of Gangamati: Gangamati or Ghazmati forest along the Gangamati canal east of Kuakata beach.

== Gallery ==
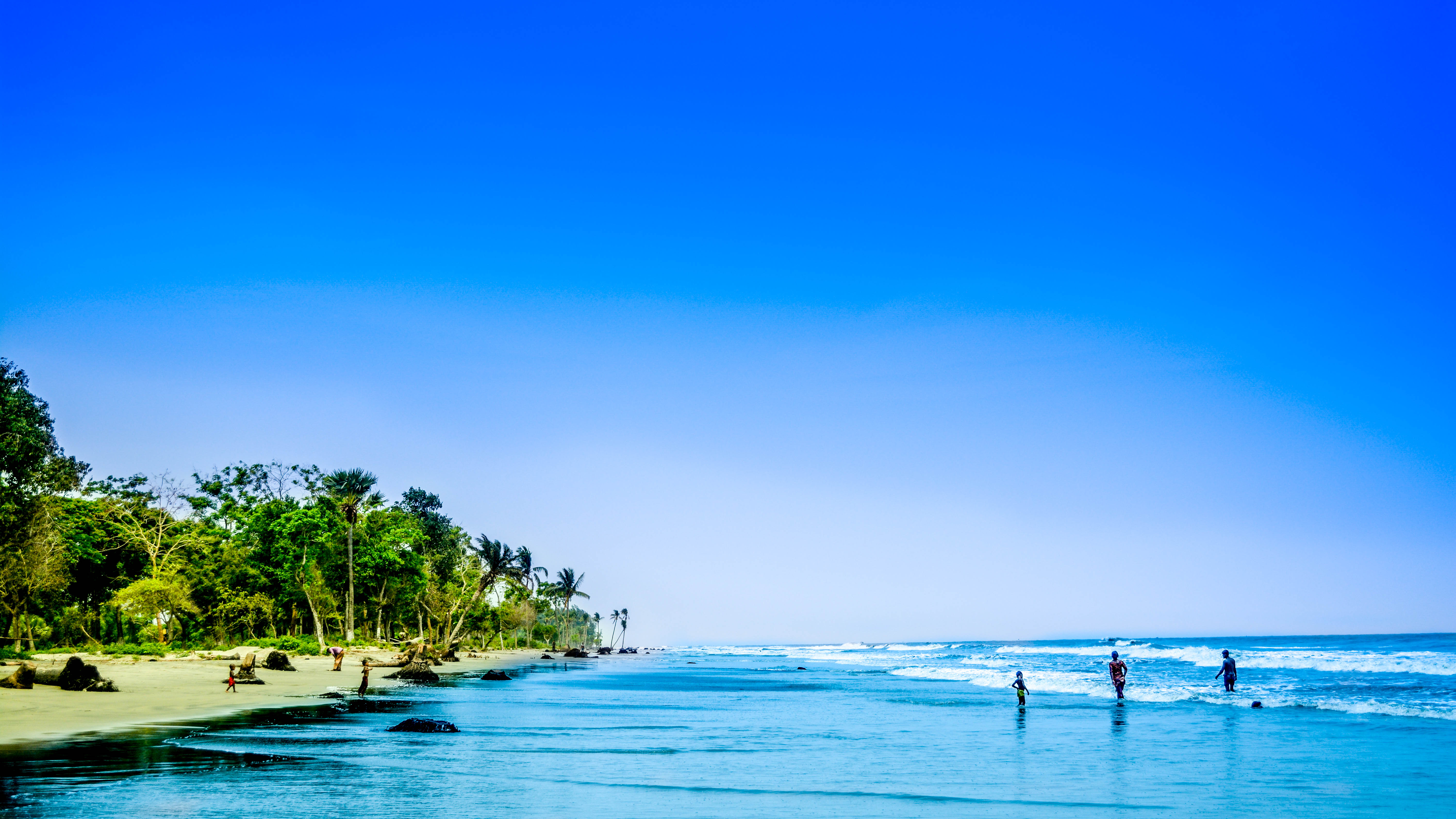
Kuakata Beach

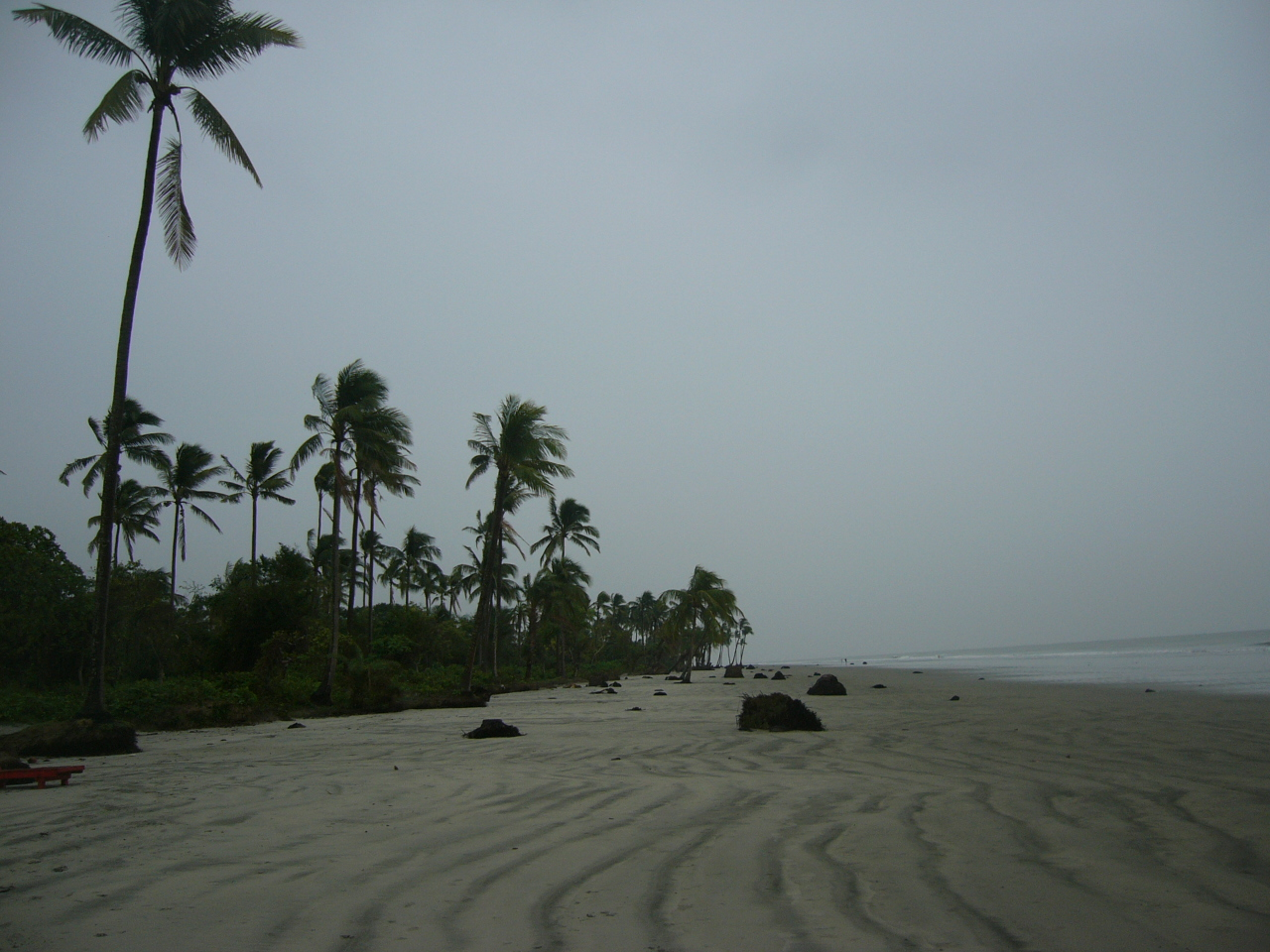
Beach

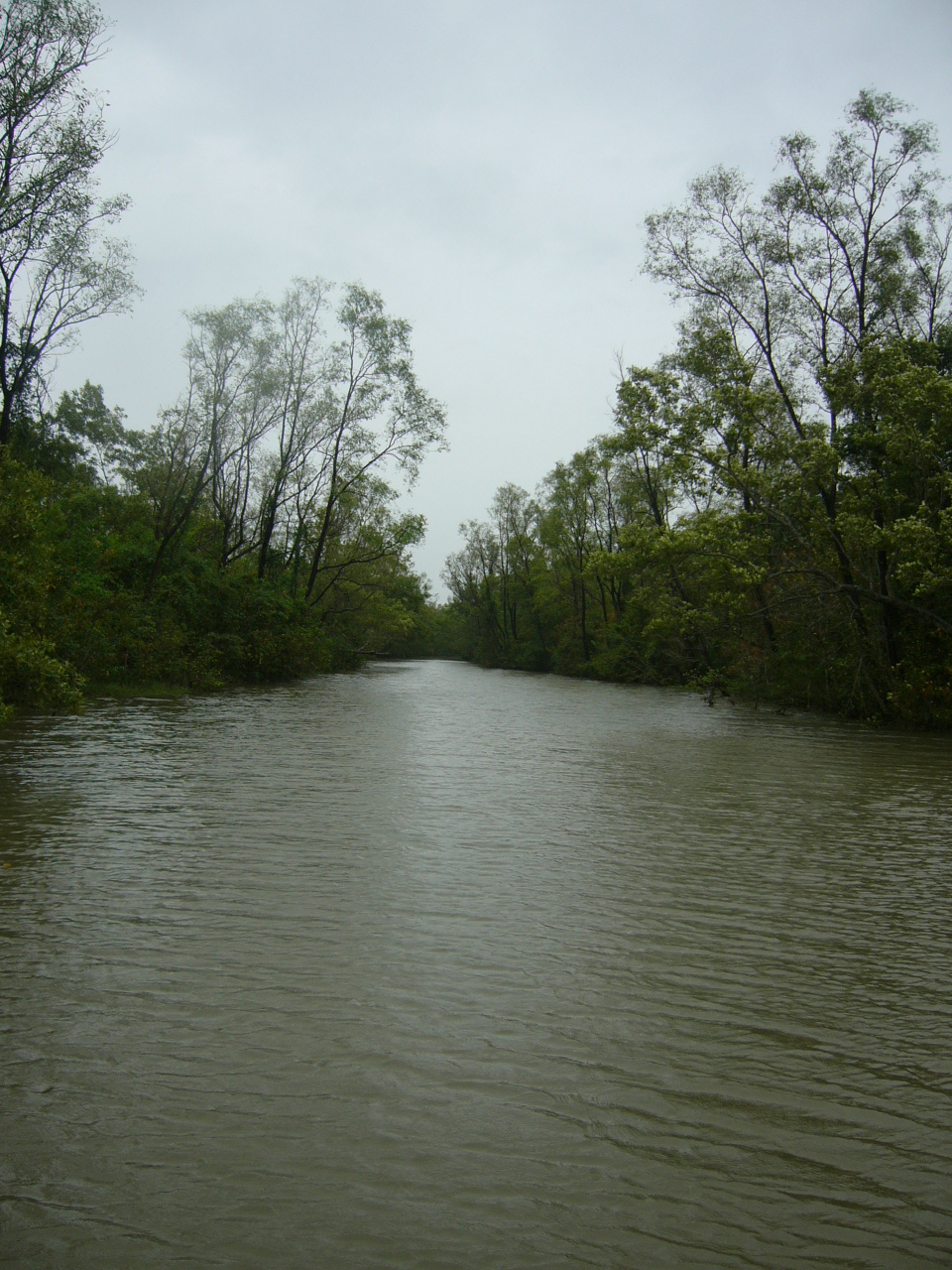
Mangrove forest

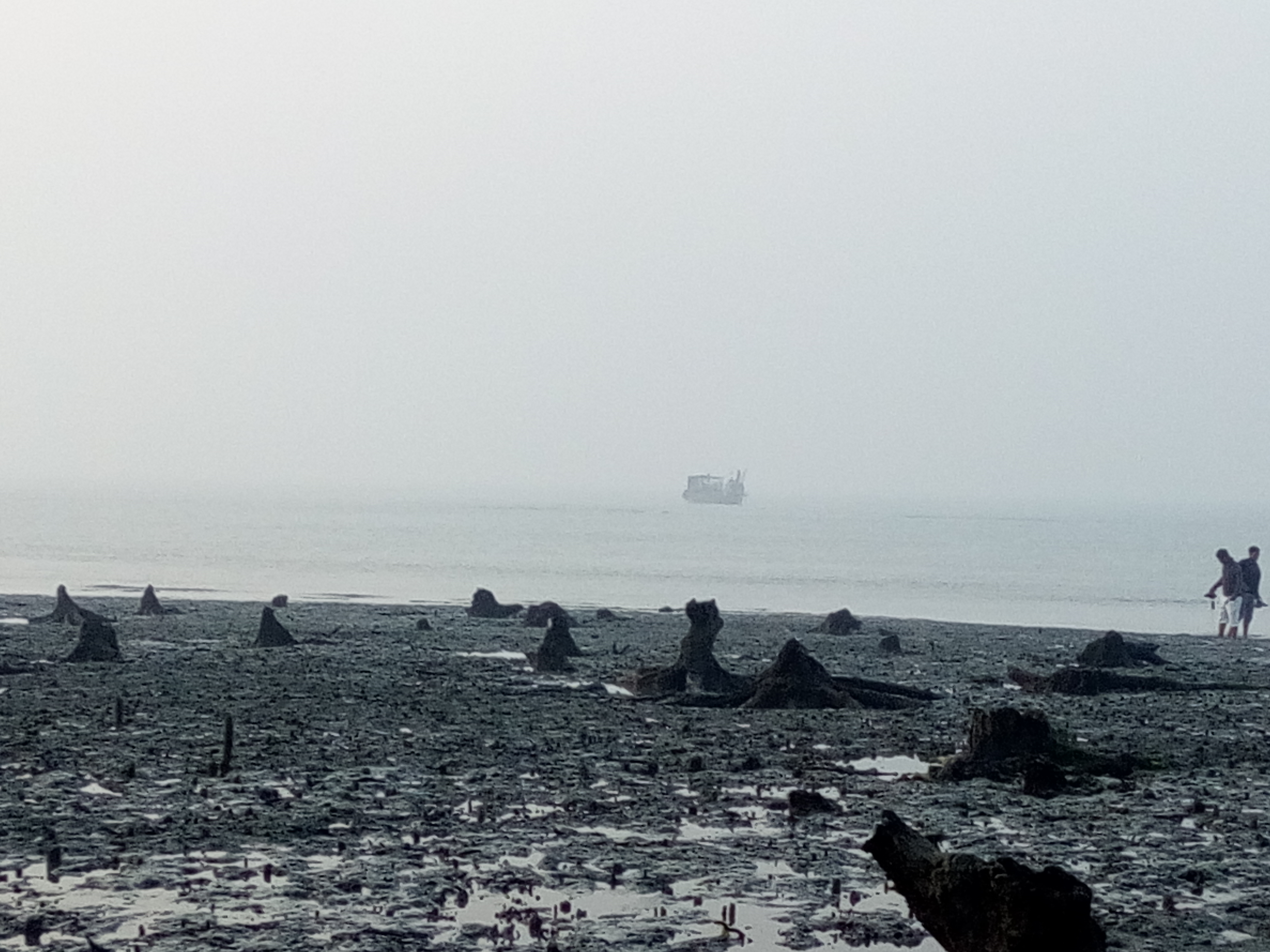
Kuakata at early morning

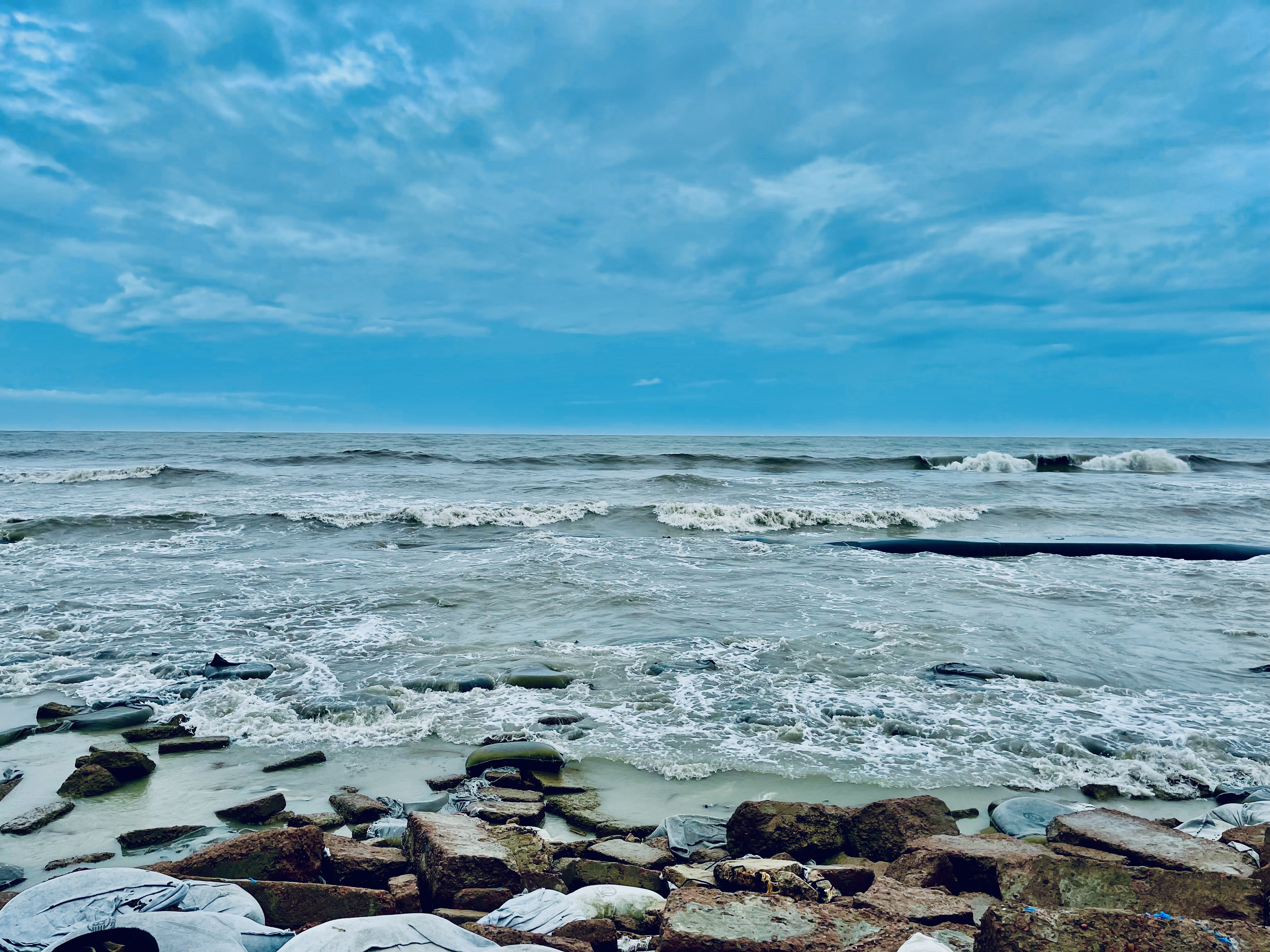
Kuakata Beach

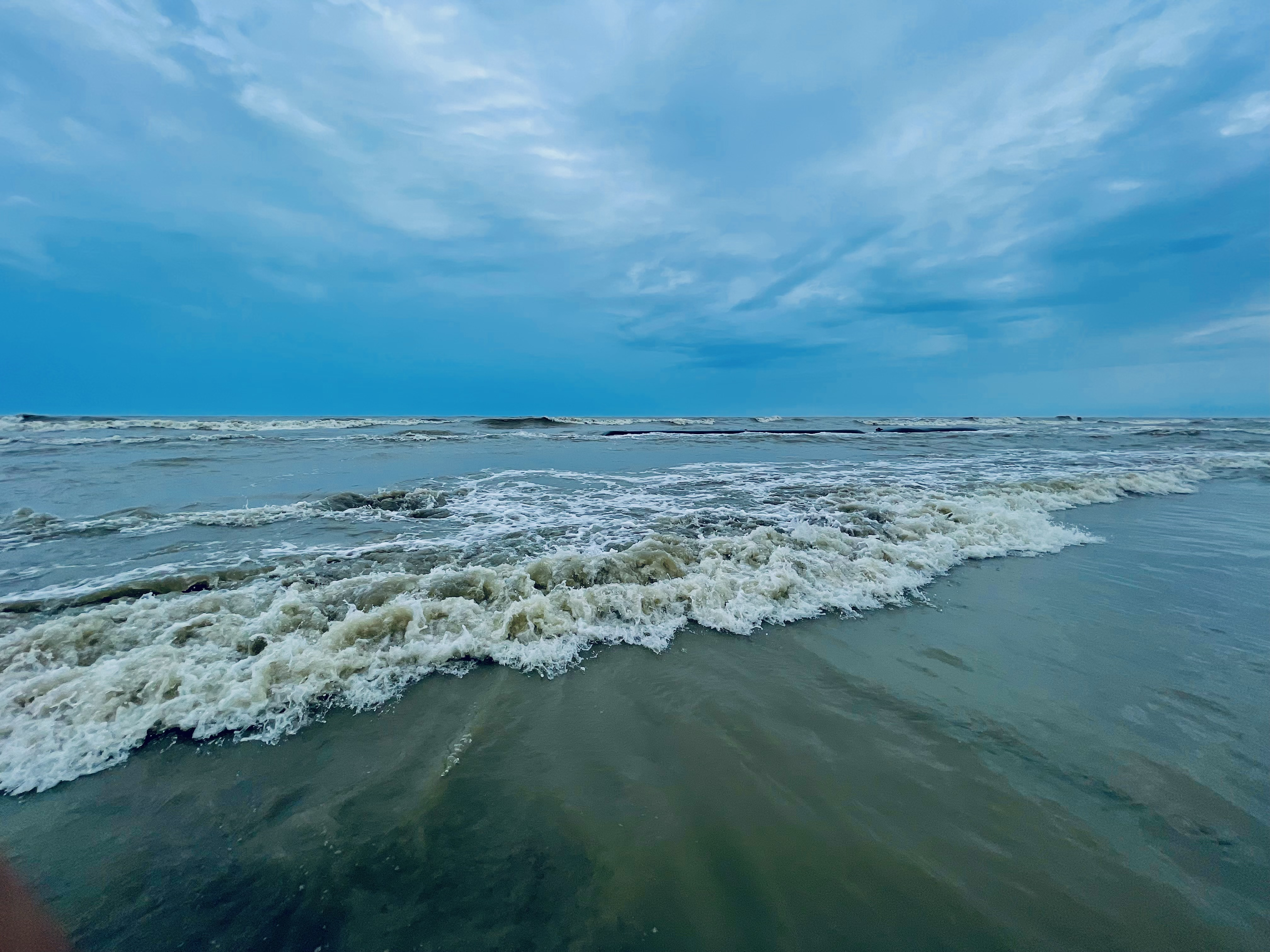
Kuakata Sea Beach

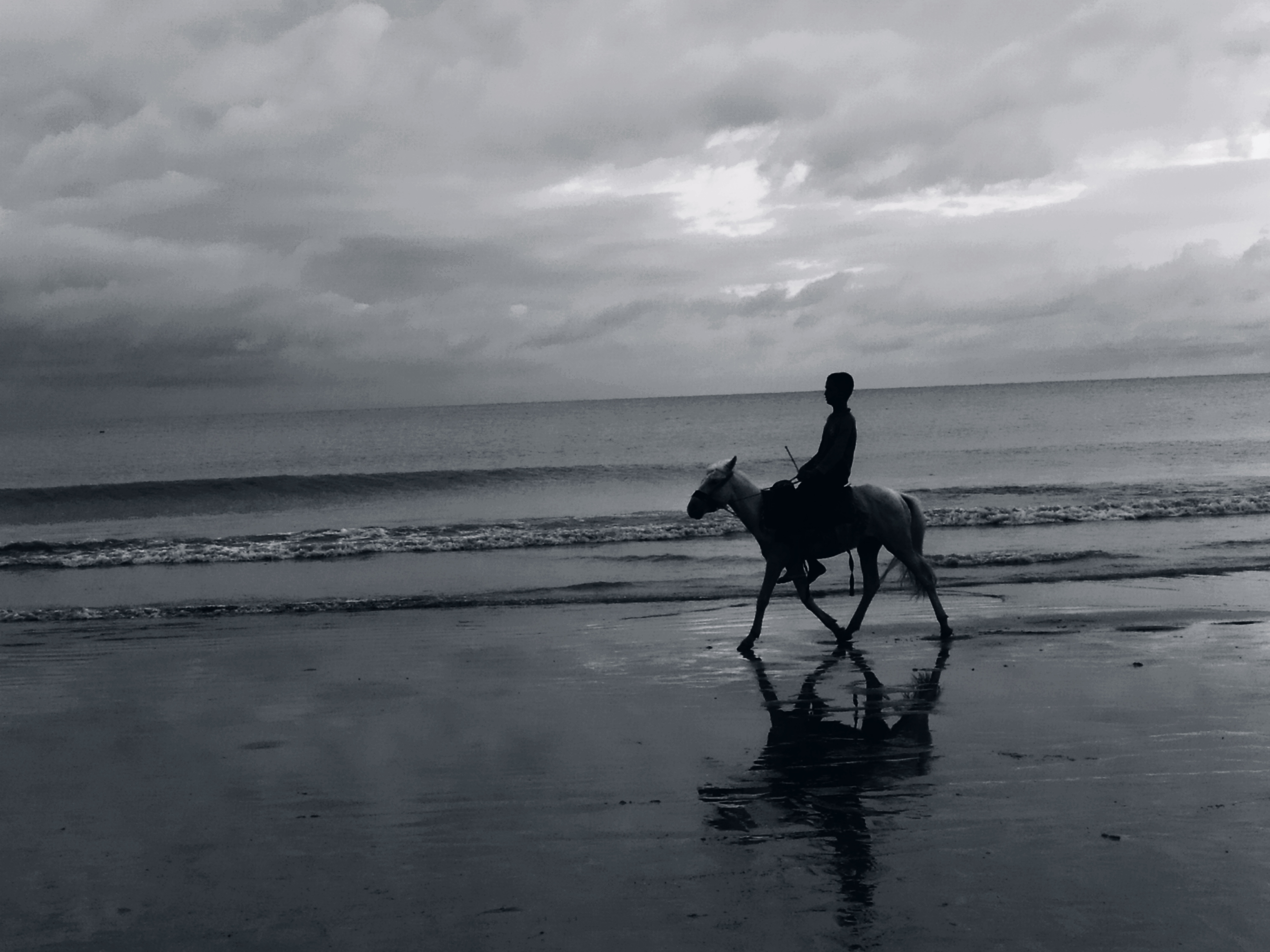
A horseman roaming on Kuakata beach

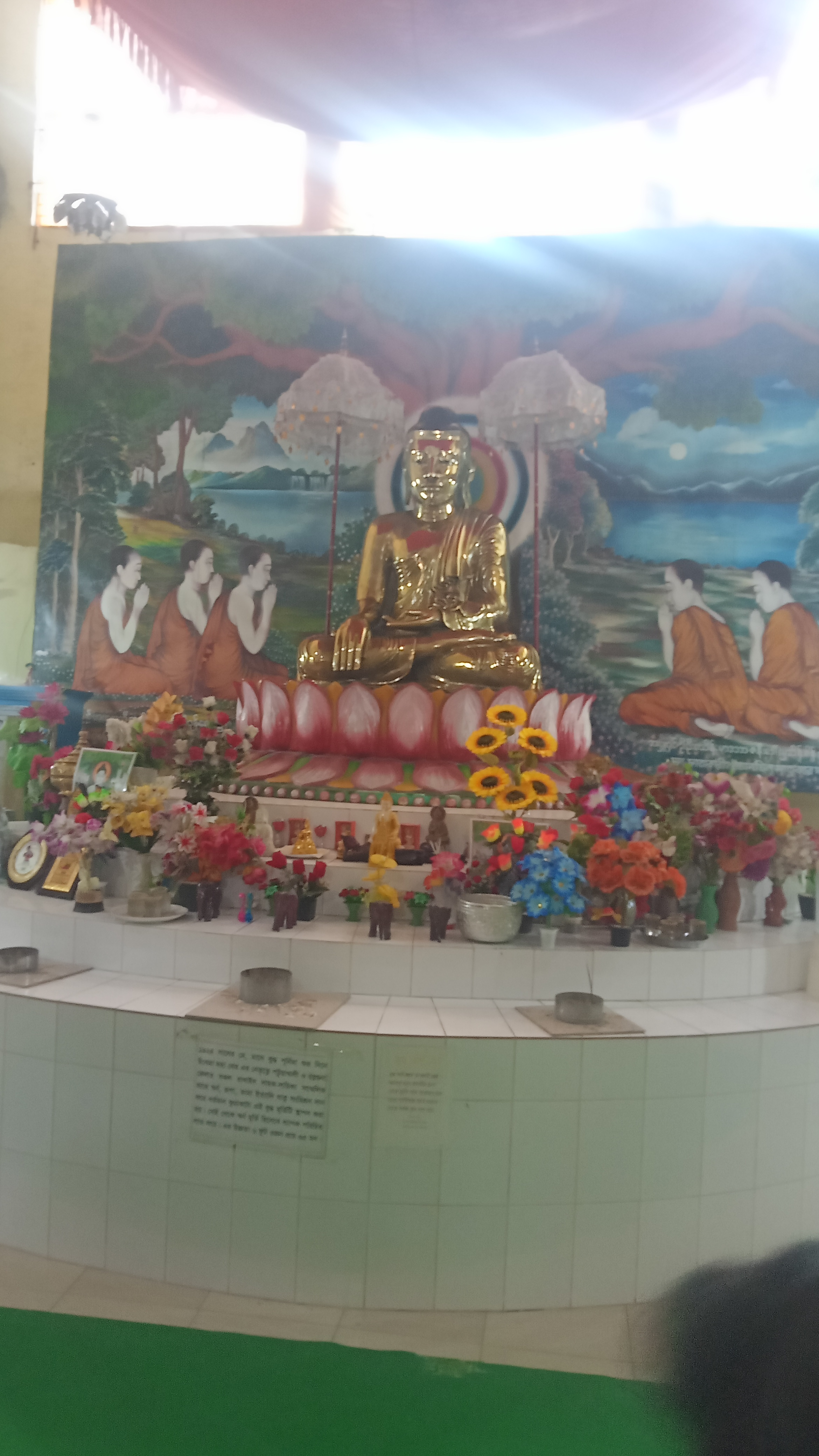
Buddha statue of Srimangal Buddha Vihar in Kuakata

== See also ==
- List of cities and towns in Bangladesh
- Cox's Bazar – a tourist beach town in southeastern Bangladesh
- Patenga – a tourist beach in the city of Chittagong
