= Kuakata Beach =

Beach in Bangladesh

Kuakata
- Beach
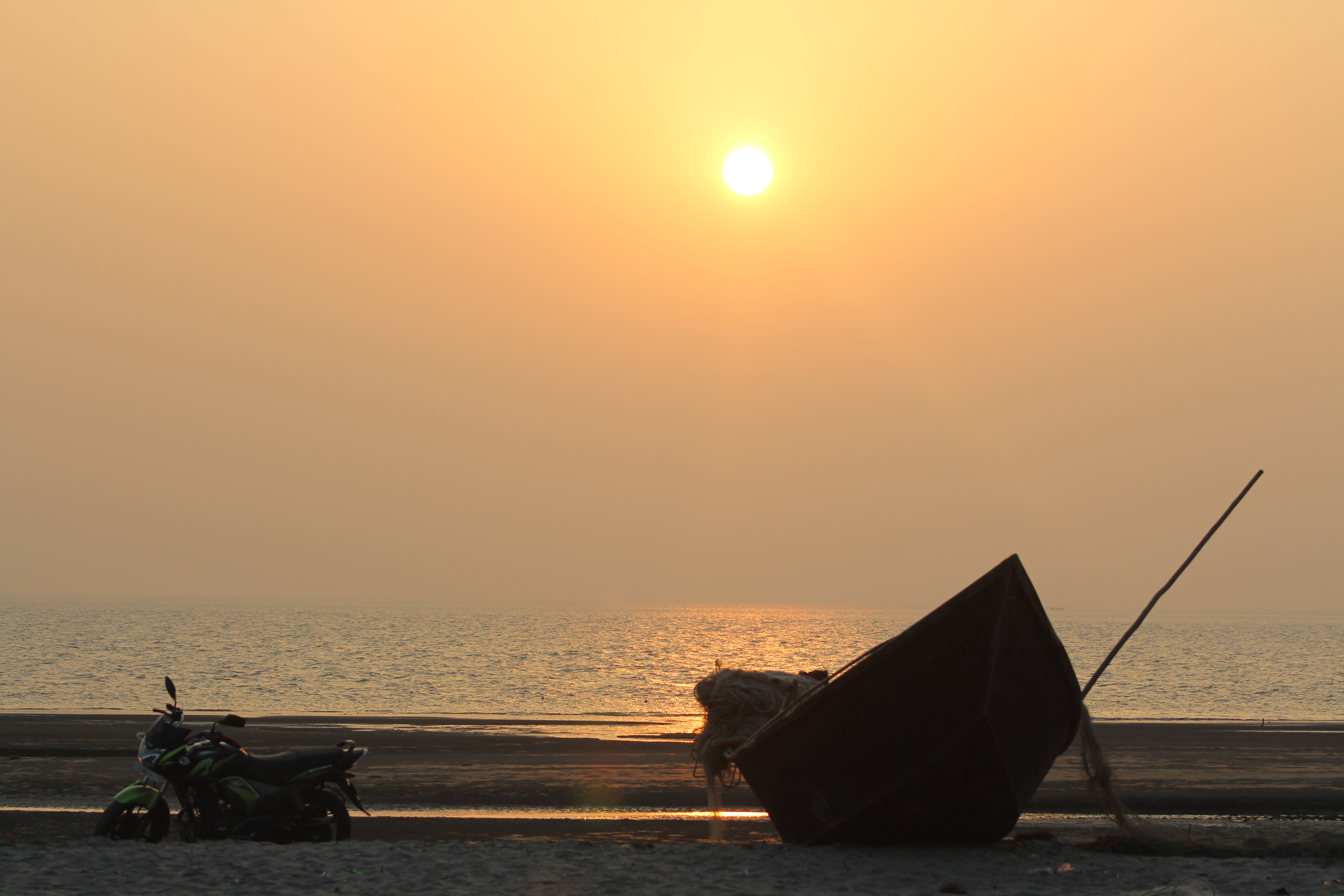
- Kuakata Beach at evening

- Coordinates: 21.8029°N 90.1809°E
- Location: Kuakata, Patuakhali Bangladesh
- Offshore water bodies: Bay of Bengal

Dimensions
  - Length: 18 km

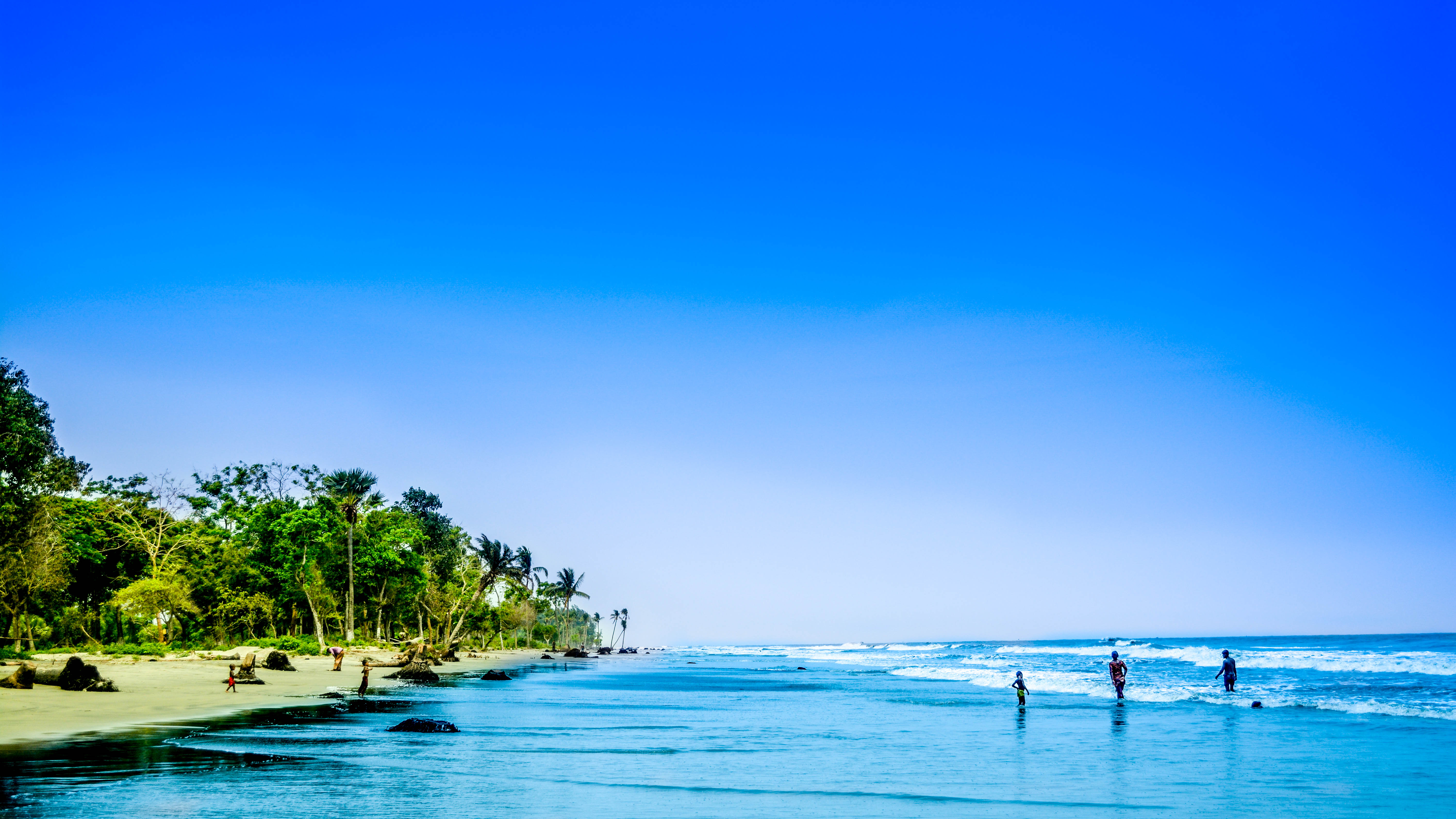
Kuakata Beach

Kuakata Beach (Bengali: কুয়াকাটা সমুদ্র সৈকত) is a beach situated in Kuakata, Patuakhali District, Bangladesh. It is 18 km in length.

It is known as "Sagor Konya" (Daughter of Sea). It is one of the top tourist attractions in Bangladesh. However, due to pollution, uncontrolled tourism, and other issues, Kuakata Beach is losing its beauty.

== Gallery ==
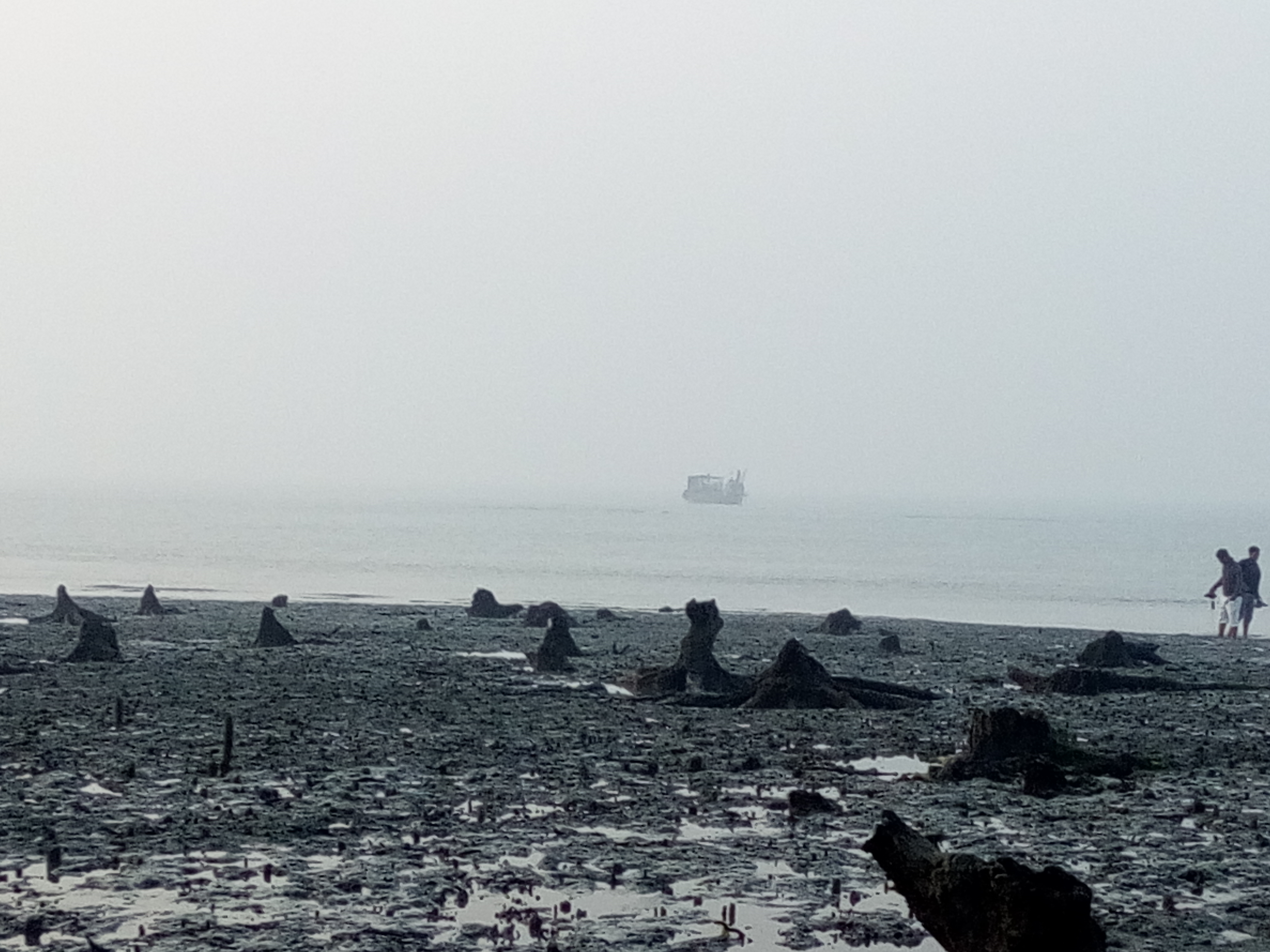
Kuakata in the morning

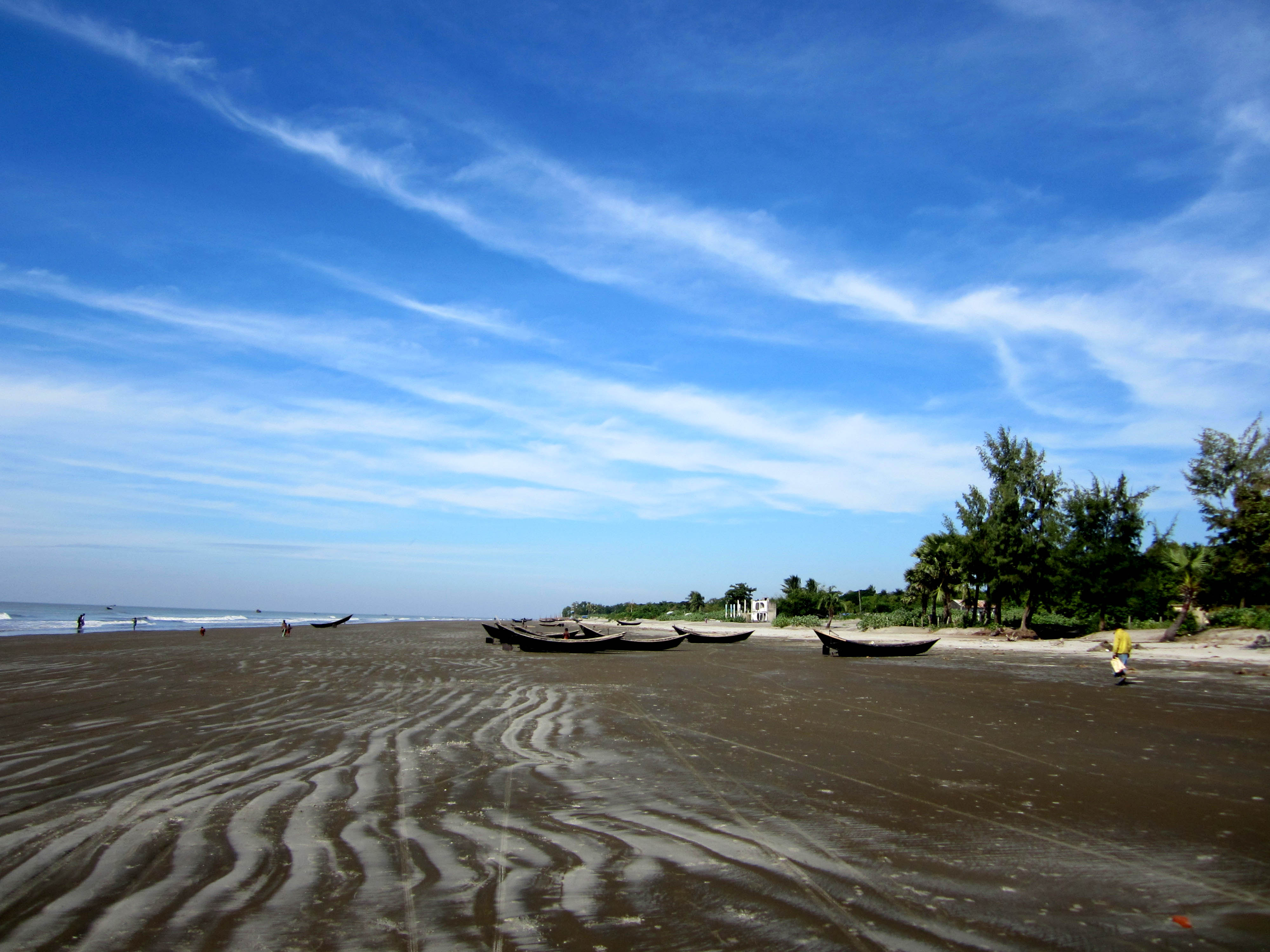
Beach area

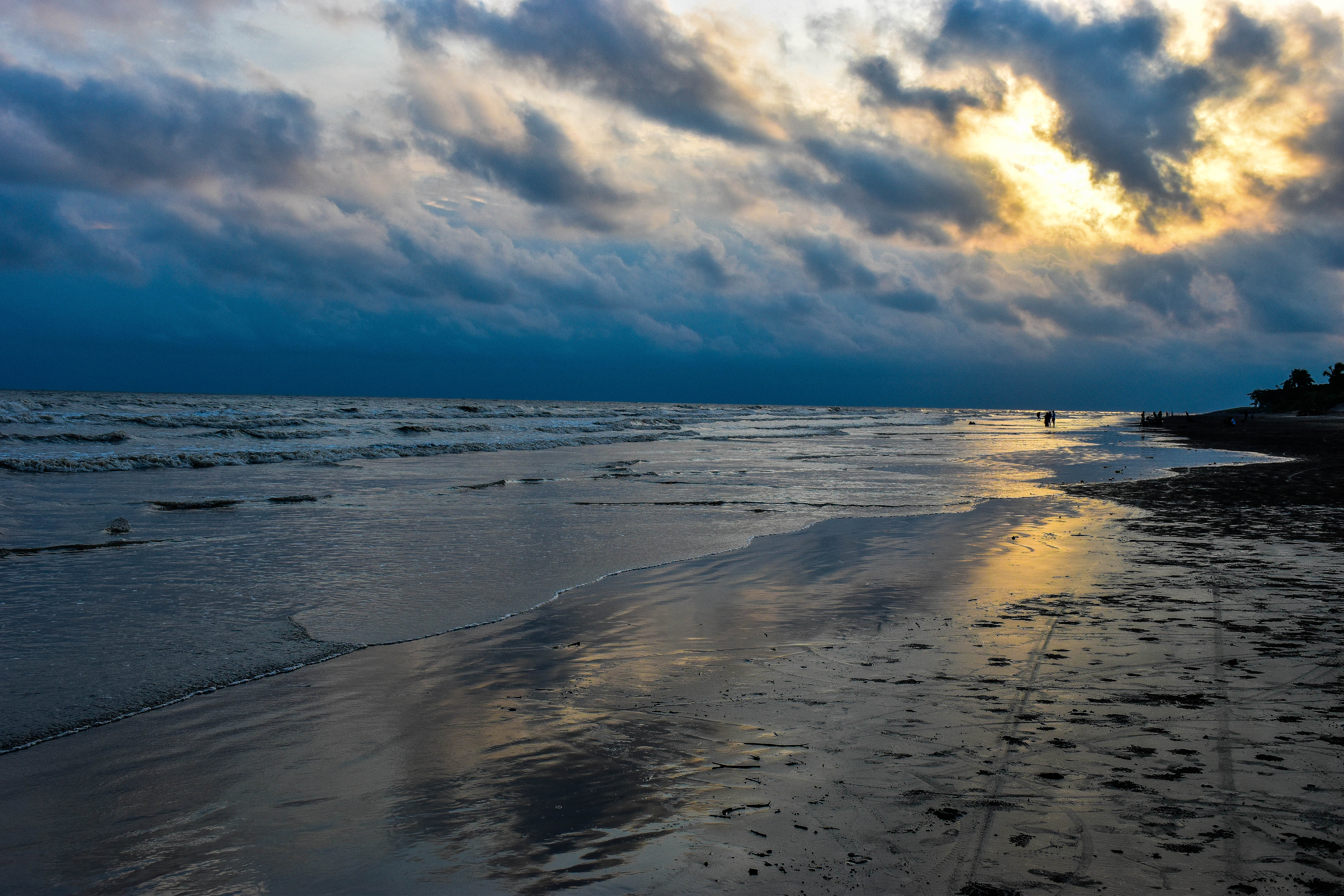
The sky at Kuakata Beach

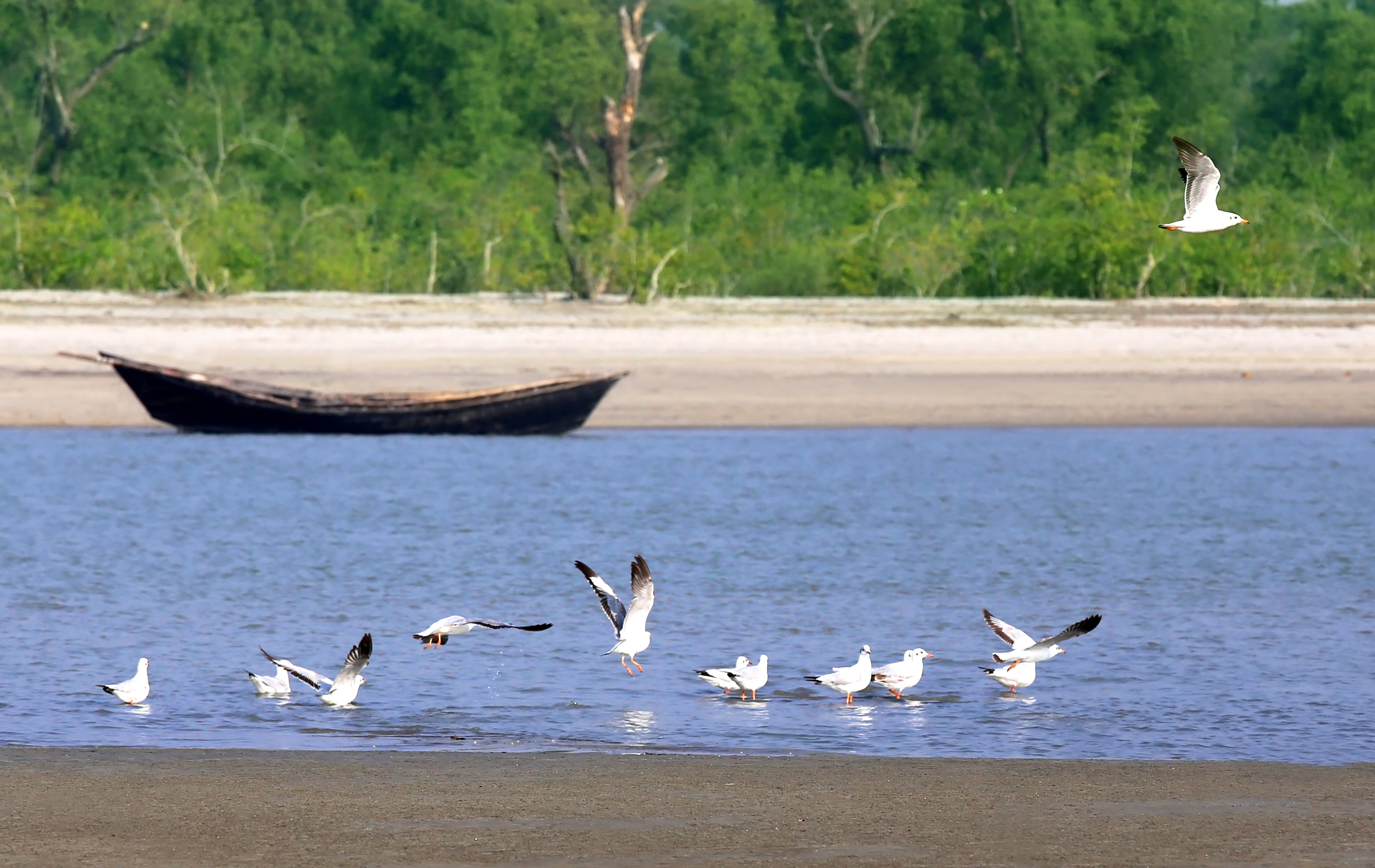
Birds at the beach

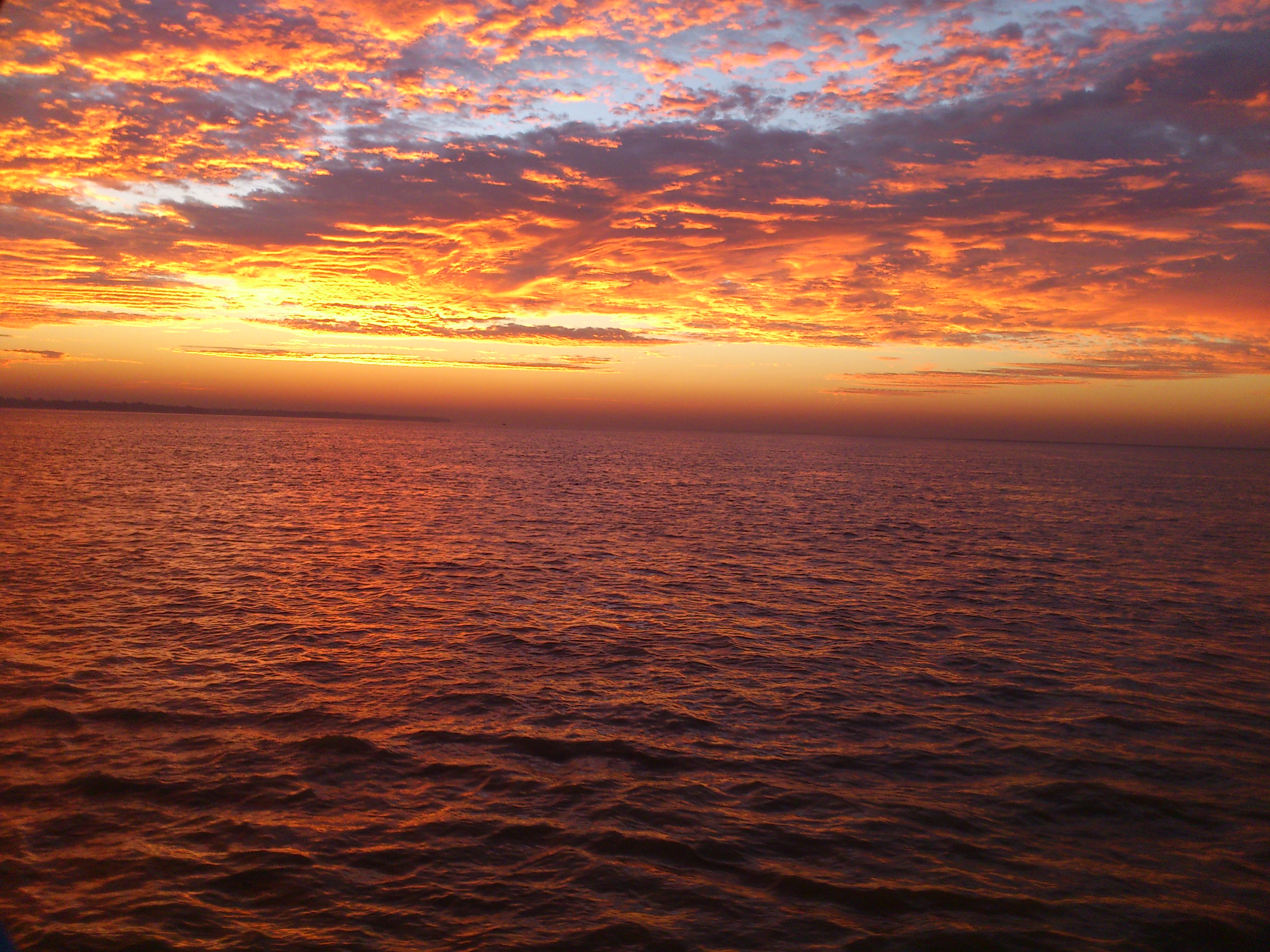
Sunset at Kuakata Beach

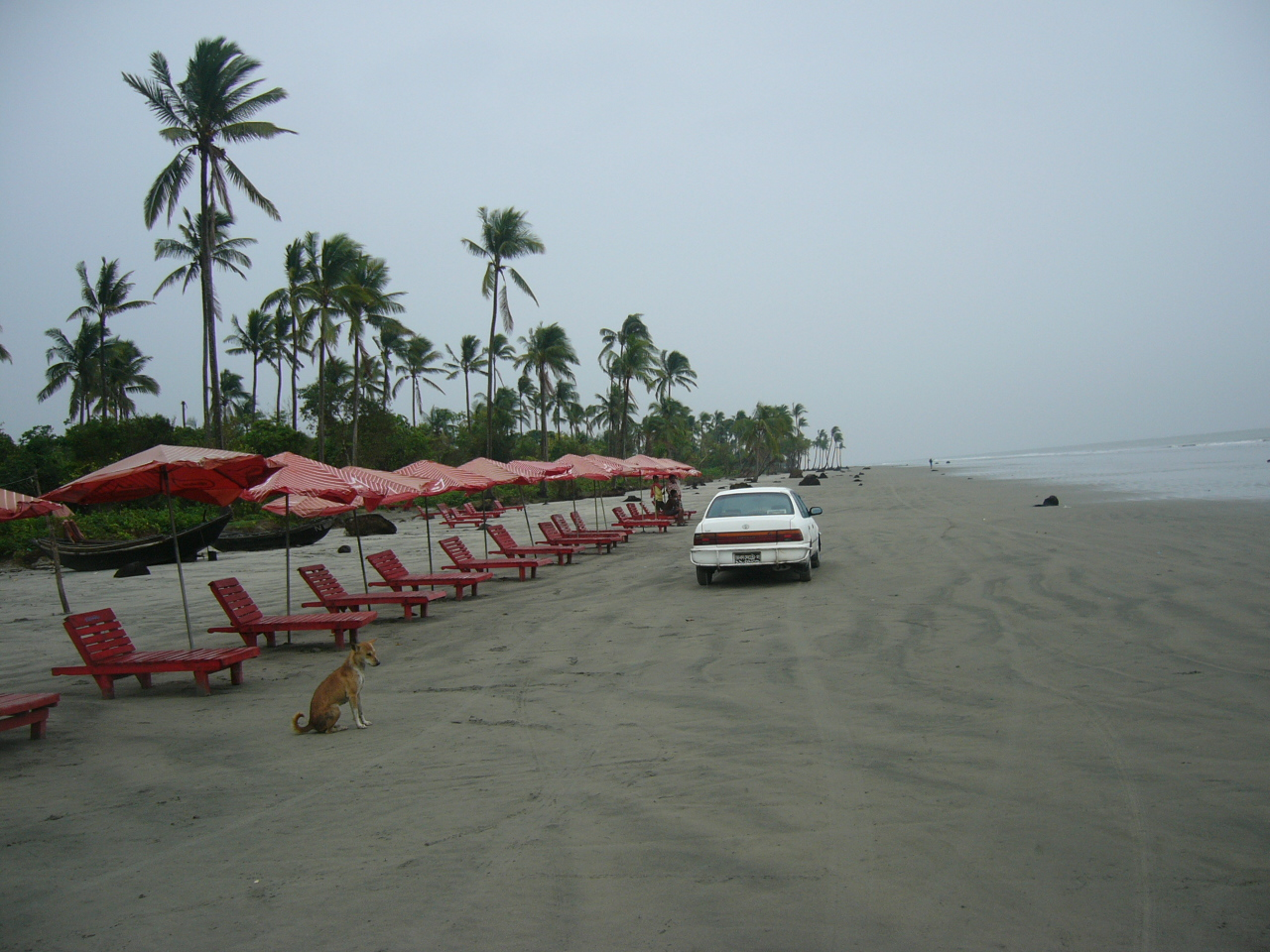
Beach area

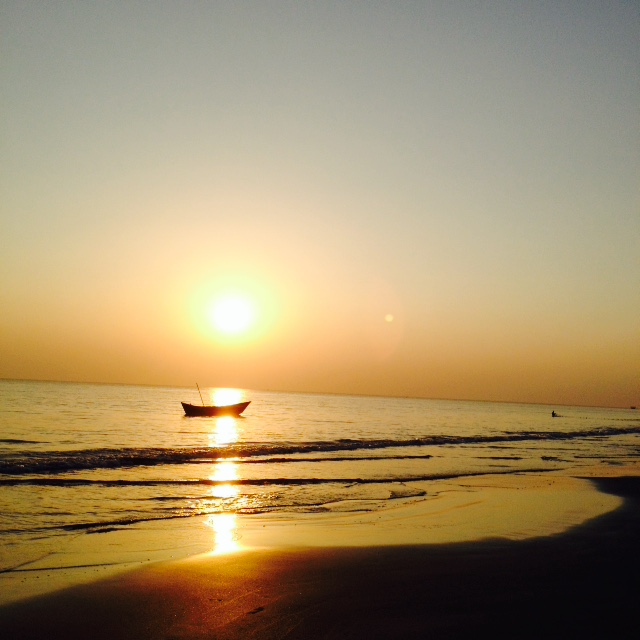
Sunrise at the beach

== See also ==
- List of beaches in Bangladesh
