= Kuakata Ecopark =

Ecopark in Kalapara Upazila, Bangladesh

- Location within Bangladesh
- Location: Patuakhali, Barisal, Bangladesh
- Nearest city: Kalapara Upazila
- Coordinates: 21.812326°N 90.137519°E
- Area: 5661 hectors
- Established: 2005
- Governing body: Barisal forestry department

Kuakata Ecopark is an ecopark of Bangladesh, located on Kalapara Upazila of Patuakhali District. It was established in 2005 and comprises an area of 5,661 hectares (13,990 acres).

== Gallery ==
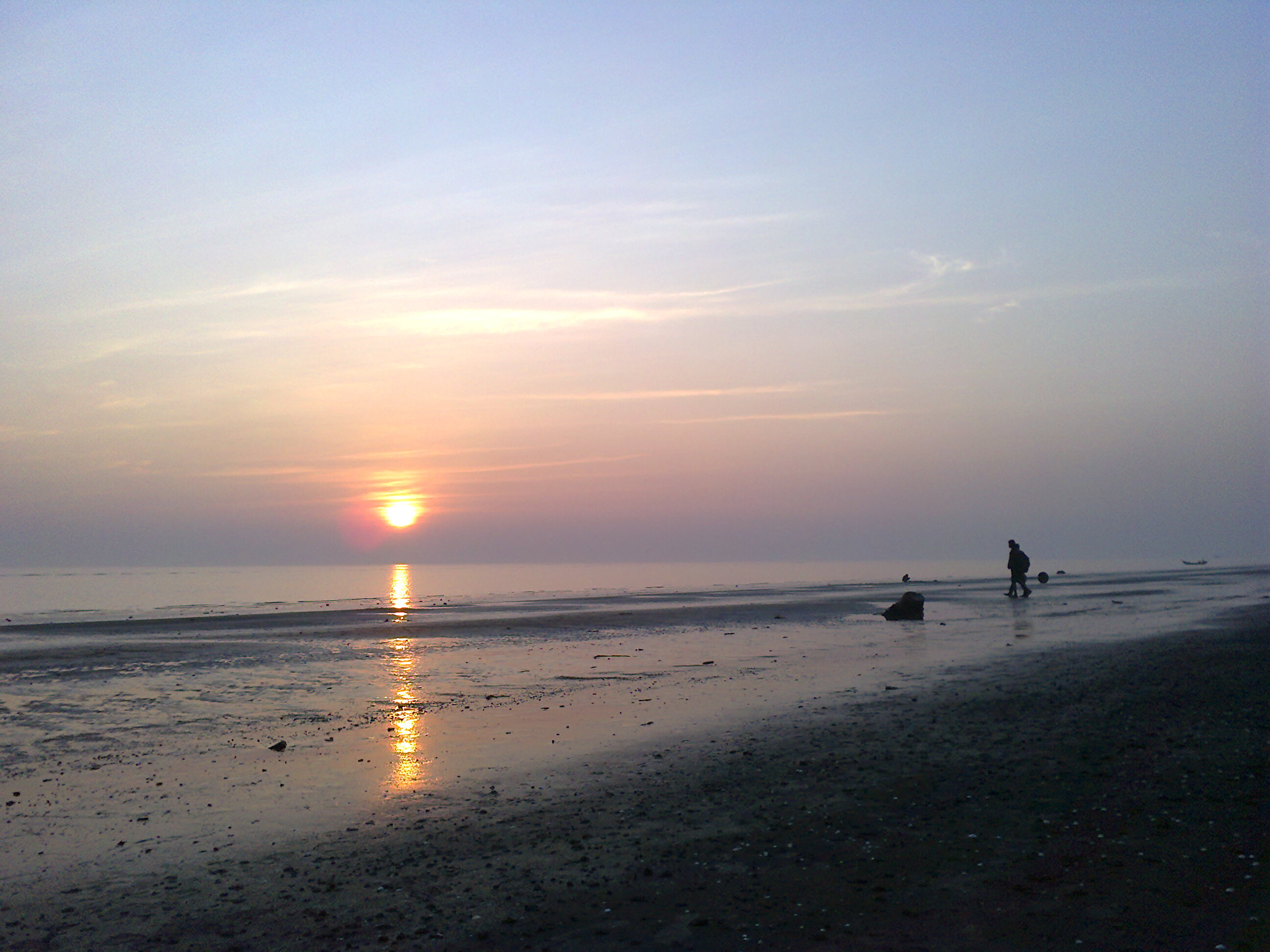

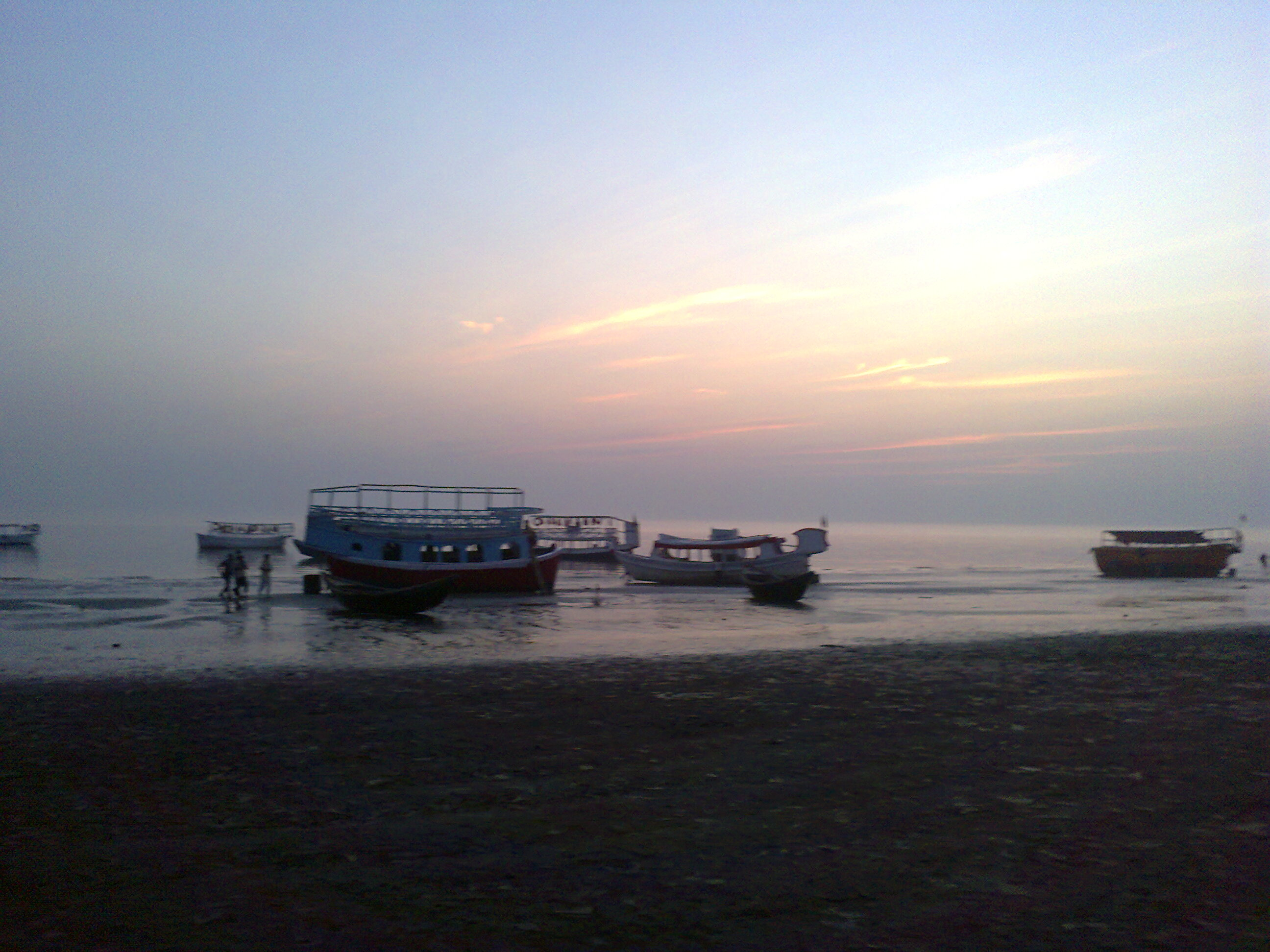

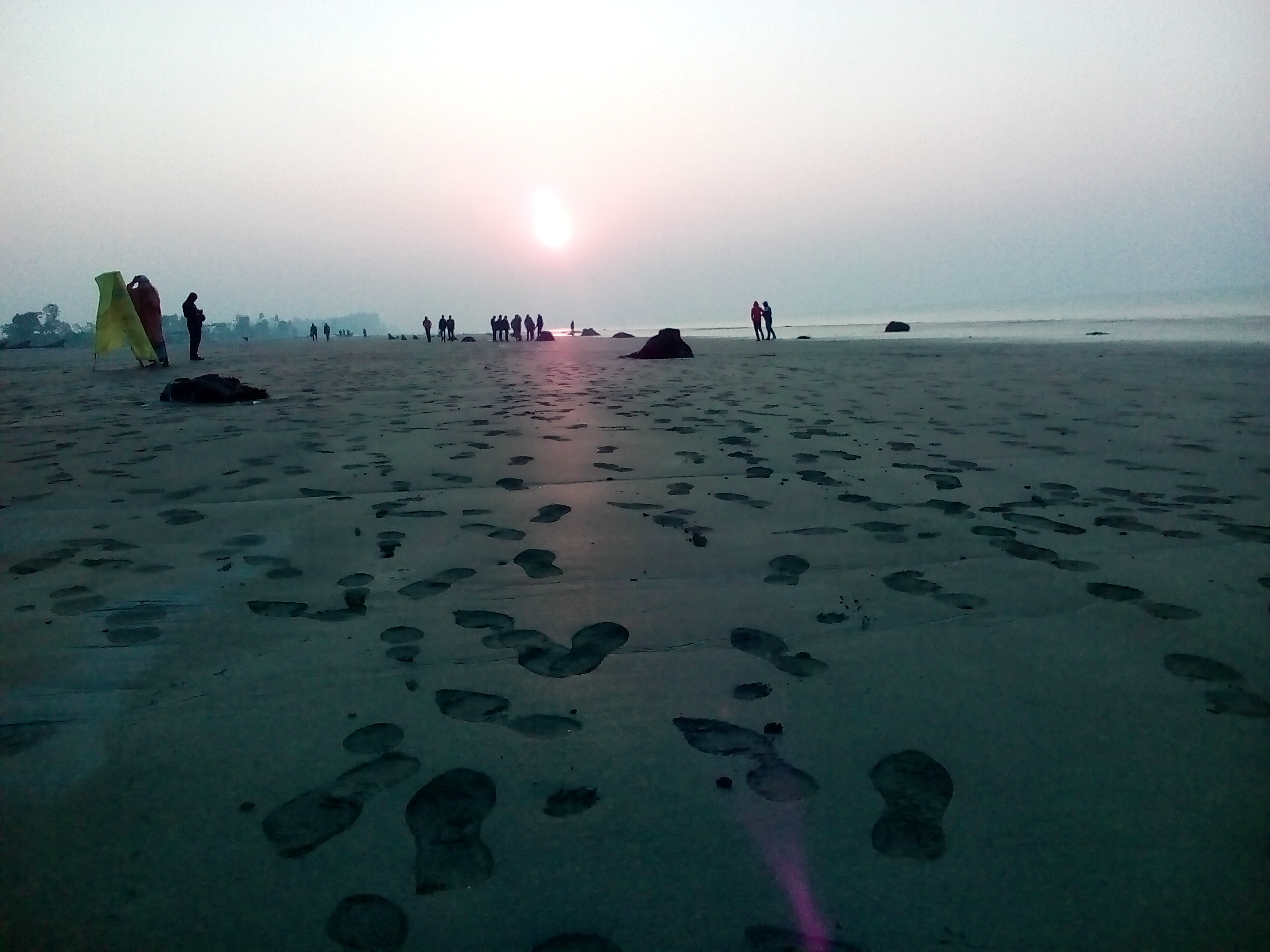

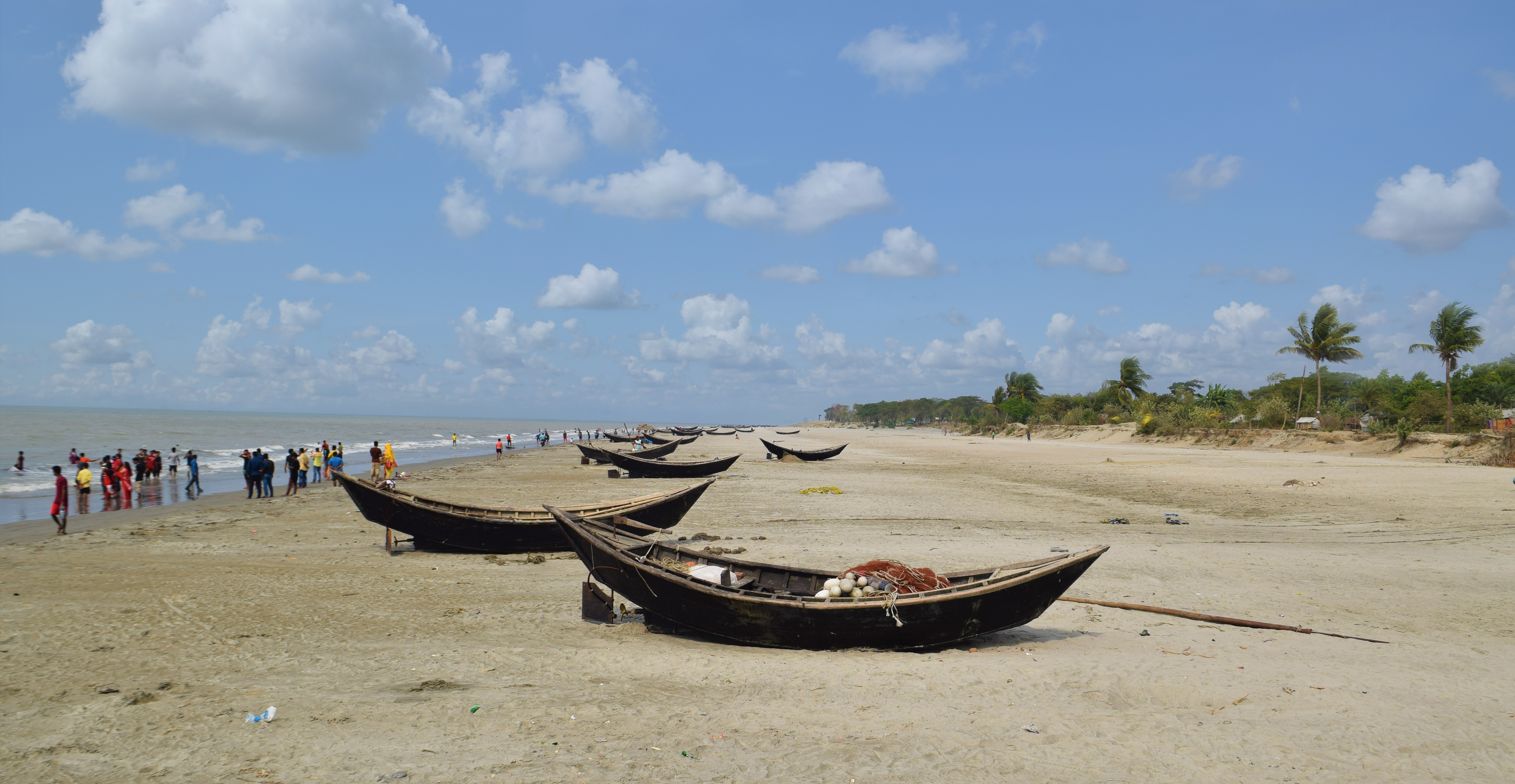
