= Andharmanik River =

- Location of mouth in Bangladesh

Location
- Country: Bangladesh
- Region: Kalapara Upazila
- District: Patuakhali District

Physical characteristics
- Mouth
  - coordinates: 21.941°N 90.140°E

The Andharmanik River is located in Bangladesh. It is one of the larger coastal rivers of the Ganges–Padma system, and one of the major rivers of Kalapara Upazila in Patuakhali District. In recent years the people of Kalapara have raised their concerns regarding the gradual drying up of the river. From the total length of about 40 kilometres (25 mi), at least 25 kilometres (16 mi) of the river have permanently dried out due to the sedimentation and rise of new alluviums. During the 1960s, the local government constructed many dams over Andharmanik and other nearby rivers to avoid the salination of the arable lands. Mainly from this period Andharmanik began to dry up. One of the most influential of these dams is the one over the Kochupatra river which is the source of Andharmanik. Other causes of the sedimentation include the illegal occupancy of canals, unrestricted farming on river area etc. In late 2013, the government announced that a new sea port would be established on the bank of Andharmanik river. Since then, the river has been gaining importance and the experts have predicted it as the future economic hub of Southern Bangladesh.
