= Wazil Khan =

Bengal soldier

Khān-i-Aʿẓam Wazil Khan
- ওয়াজিল খাঁন

1460s

Governor of Bakla
- Monarch: Barbak Shah I

Religious life
- Religion: Islam
- Denomination: Sunni

Muslim leader
- Teacher: Khan Jahan Ali
- Based in: Jessore; Gournadi Qasba

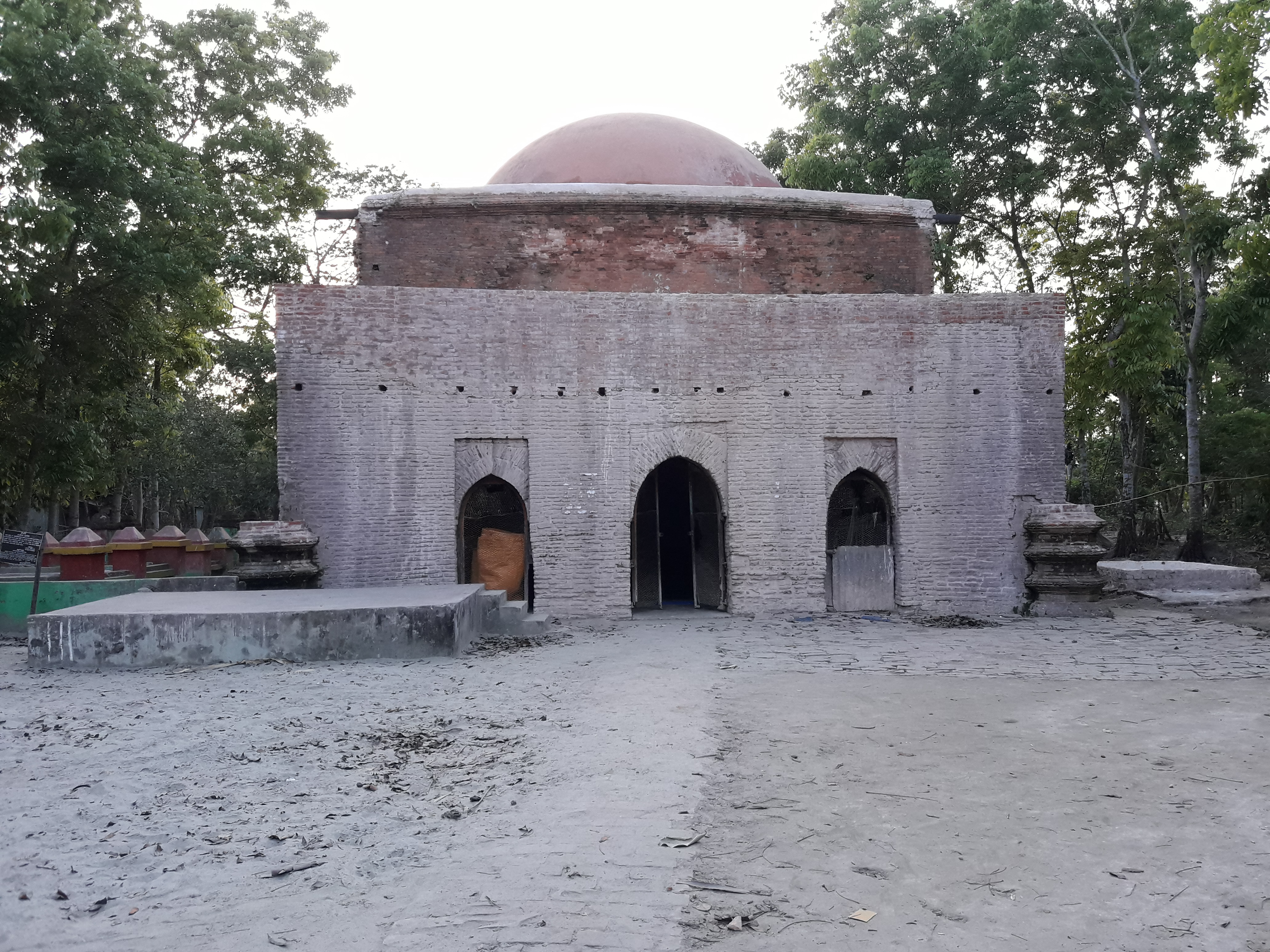
The Majidbaria Shahi Mosque commissioned by Wazil Khan.

Ajyal Khan, popularly known as Wazil Khan (Bengali: ওয়াজিল খান), was an officer of the Bengal Sultanate during the reign of Sultan Ruknuddin Barbak Shah. He was the appointed Khan-i-Azam of Bakla (present-day Barisal, Bangladesh).

== Background ==
It is said that Khan was an Arabian merchant and a follower of Khan Jahan Ali, a Muslim preacher and the Khan-i-Azam of Khalifatabad (present-day Khulna Division, Bangladesh). Ali is credited for the architectural development of Khalifatabad, where he also contributed to propagating Islam through the construction of various mosques in the region which acted as important community centres. Ali later instructed a group of his followers under the leadership of Wazil Khan to spread out. Wazil Khan then led the group by boat from Sheikherghat, Jessore to Gournadi in Chandradwip (Barisal) where they settled.

== Career ==
Khan served as an officer under Sultan Ruknuddin Barbak Shah (r. 1459–1474), the Sultan of Bengal of the Ilyas Shahi dynasty. He was stationed in the Bakla region (present-day Barisal, Bangladesh). In 870 AH (1465–1466 CE), he established a shahi mosque in present-day Mirzaganj, Patuakhali. The mosque is thought to be the earliest mosque and brick-structure in the region.

== See also ==
- Sabi Khan, 17th-century Mughal governor of Bakla
- Mirza Agha Baqer
