= Mirzaganj, Patuakhali =

Mirzaganj মির্জাগঞ্জ
- Village
- Location in Bangladesh
- Coordinates: 22°21.5′N 90°14′E
- Country: Bangladesh
- Division: Barisal Division
- District: Patuakhali District
- Upazila: Mirzaganj Upazila

Area
  - Total: 6.59 km^{2} (2.54 sq mi)

Population (2022)
  - Total: 7,238
  - Density: 1,100/km^{2} (2,840/sq mi)
- Time zone: UTC+6 (Bangladesh Time)

Mirzaganj is a village in Mirzaganj Upazila of Patuakhali District in the Barisal Division of southern-central Bangladesh.

== Demography ==
According to the 2022 Census of Bangladesh, Mirzaganj had 1,562 households and a population of 7,238. It has a total area of 6.59 km^{2} (2.54 sq mi).

== See also ==
- Mirzaganj Union
