= Union councils of Patuakhali District =

Union councils of Patuakhali District (Bengali: পটুয়াখালী জেলার ইউনিয়ন পরিষদসমূহ) are the smallest rural administrative and local government units in Patuakhali District of Bangladesh. There are 8 upazilas in Patuakhali district with 52 Union councils. The list are below:

== Dumki Upazila ==
Dumki Upazila is divided into five union parishads:

- Angaria Union
- Labukhali Union
- Muradia Union
- Pangasia Union
- Sreerampur Union

== Patuakhali Sadar Upazila ==
Patuakhali Sadar Upazila is divided into Patuakhali Municipality and 12 union parishads:

- Auliapur Union
- Badarpur Union
- Boro Bighai Union
- Choto Bighai Union
- Itbaria Union
- Jainkathi Union
- Kalikapur Union
- Kamalapur Union
- Laukathi Union
- Lohalia Union
- Madarbunia Union
- Marichbunia Union

== Mirzaganj Upazila ==
Mirzaganj Upazila is divided into Mirzaganj Municipality and six union parishads:

- Amragachia Union
- Deuli Subidkhali Union
- Kakrabunia Union
- Madhabkhali Union
- Majidbaria Union
- Mirzaganj Union
