= Miabari Mosque =

Mosque in Patuakhali, Bangladesh

- মিয়াবাড়ী মসজিদ
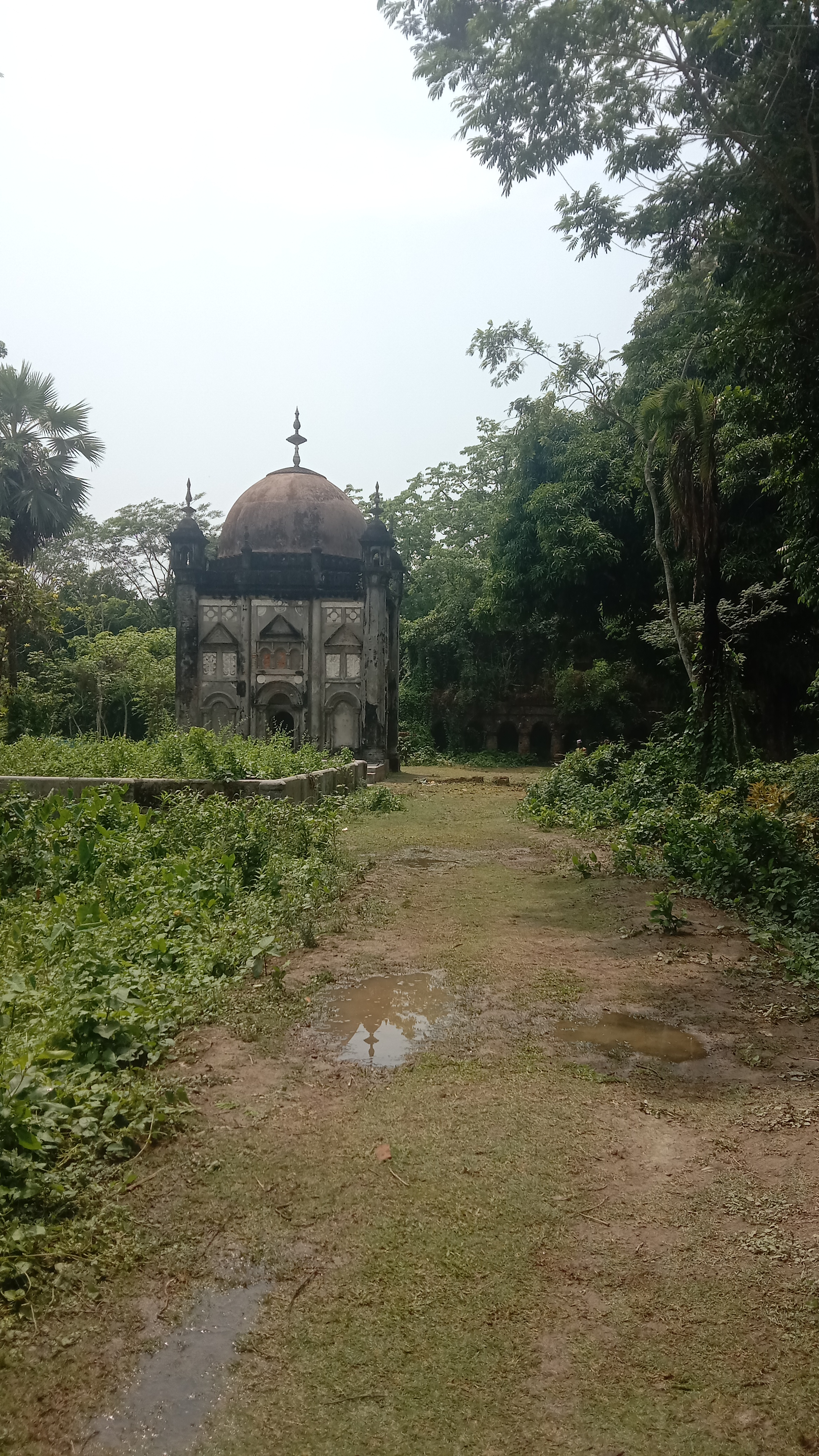

Religion
- Affiliation: Islam
- Ownership: Department of Archaeology, Bangladesh
- Year consecrated: 19th century
- Status: Preserved

Location
- Location: Ranipur, Patuakhali, Barisal District
- Country: Bangladesh

Architecture
- Style: Mughal

Miabari Mosque is an ancient mosque located in Ranipur area of Deuli Subidkhali Union, Mirzaganj Upazila, Patuakhali District, Bangladesh. The mosque is also known as Chowdhury Bari Mosque. Covering an area of 2,424 square feet, the mosque has a large dome at the top. There are four minarets at the four corners of the building, each topped with a smaller dome. Surrounding the main dome are eight smaller minarets. There are carved decorations on the inner and outer walls. There are three entrances to the mosque. The semi-circular carvings above the doors give the mosque a distinctive feature. Miabari Mosque is now not only a place of worship but also a scenic recreational spot for visitors.

== History ==
No specific information is available about the founder or the time of establishment of the mosque. However, it is believed to have been built in the mid-19th century. Over time, the mosque gradually became known as the "Miabari Mosque". According to locals, the mosque was part of the Zamindari estate of Shibn Khan during the Mughal period. The zamindar of Ranipur Miabari, Arman Ali Shah, built the mosque, and it was named "Shahi Jame Mosque" after him.

== Architecture ==
It is a historic single-domed mosque built of lime and surki (brick dust). The main building of the mosque measures about 200 square feet with a height of about 50 feet. There are four minarets at the four corners of the building, eight small minarets in the middle, and a large dome in the center. There are two entrances—one in the front and one on the north side. The mosque is a single-storey structure adorned with fine craftsmanship. Inside, 30 to 40 worshippers can pray at a time. Over the years, the plaster on the inner and outer walls has decayed, exposing the lime-surki. Rainwater has caused moss to grow on the walls, discoloring the mosque. The outer walls are decorated with white floral motifs, considered an ancient feature of Muslim architecture. To the east of the mosque, there is a large pond of about one acre with steps, used by worshippers for ablution and bathing. Although the mosque was built in a planned manner, lack of proper maintenance is gradually diminishing its beauty.
