= Majidbaria Shahi Mosque =

Ancient mosque and archaeological site in Bangladesh

- মজিদবাড়িয়া শাহী মসজিদ
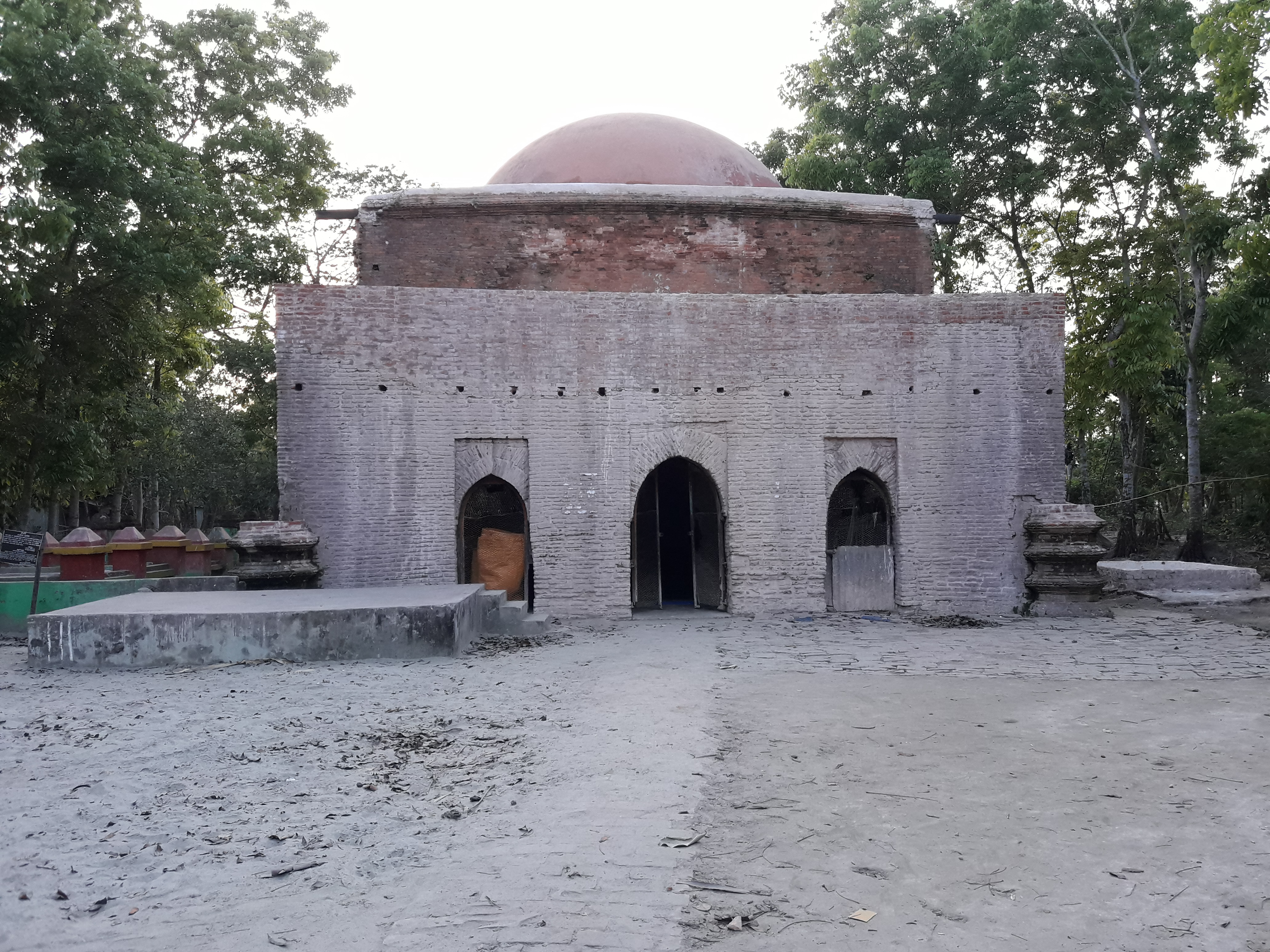
- The mosque under reconstruction in 2018

- Location of the mosque in Bangladesh

Religion
- Affiliation: Islam
- Ecclesiastical or organizational status: Mosque
- Status: Active; Protected

Location
- Location: Mirzaganj, Patuakhali District, Barisal Division
- Country: Bangladesh
- Interactive map of Majidbaria Shahi Mosque
- Administration: Department of Archaeology
- Coordinates: 22°14′59″N 90°11′43″E

Architecture
- Type: Mosque architecture
- Style: Bengal Sultanate
- Founder: Uzayr Khan
- Established: between 870 AH (1465/1466 CE) and 879 AH (1474/1475 CE)

Specifications
- Length: 15 m (49 ft)
- Width: 11 m (35 ft)
- Dome: One
- Minaret: Six
- Inscriptions: One
- Materials: Limestone; bricks

The Majidbaria Shahi Mosque (Bengali: মজিদবাড়িয়া শাহী মসজিদ, Arabic: المسجد الشاهي مجيد باريا) is a mosque and archaeological site located in the village of Majidbaria in Mirzaganj Upazila, part of the Patuakhali District of southern Bangladesh. The name is taken from its location "Masjidbari" which literally translates "Mosque House". Completed during the 15th century, it is the oldest mosque and first brick building in the Greater Barisal region, having been built during the reign of Sultan Ruknuddin Barbak Shah.

== History ==
During the reign of Sultan Ruknuddin Barbak Shah, his minister Khan-i-Azam Uzayr Khan constructed this mosque from 870-879 AH (612/613 CE).

In 1584, a cyclone severely damaged infrastructure in the Bakla-Chandradwip region. During this period, the area was under the rule of Kandarpanarayan Rai, the Raja of Chandradwip, who also evacuated his capital in Bakla. While it was yet to fully recover from the natural disaster, Chandradwip was faced with Magh and Portuguese pirates. Muslim-dominated villages such as Madhabkhali, Mirzaganj, Bibichini, Talgachia, Maqamia, Karuna, Gulishahkhali, Ghuslkhali, Faqirkhali, Auliyapur and Dhulia were deserted and the area turned into a jungle, effectively becoming a part of the Sundarbans again.

In the 1860s, British Raj began plans to cultivate the Sundarbans and rediscovered the mosque, which was being inhabited by a fakir. The mosque was visited by Henry Beveridge, the District Magistrate of Barisal. In 1904, the interior of the mosque was renovated under Nicholas Beatson-Bell, then District Magistrate of Backergunge district. The area then became known as Masjidbari or Masjidbaria by the locals, and later became corrupted to Majidbaria, though others claim that it was named after a local chairman named Majid. The mosque is under the protection of the Bangladeshi Department of Archaeology, though it continues to be actively used by worshippers.

== Architecture ==
The mosque is built of limestone and terracotta bricks with attractive architectural style and craftsmanship. The mosque is 15 metres (49 ft) long and 11 metres (35 ft) wide. The main structure has three exquisitely carved mihrabs, three archways, six minars at eight corners, four windows in total on east-north and south sides, square main room and a verandah. Apart from this, with 190-centimetre (75 in) thick walls, some ancient artefacts can be seen inside this mosque such as an old chest. An ancient graveyard and lake lies to the south of the mosque, which includes the tombs of Yaqin Shah and Kala Shah. The entrance of the verandah on the east measures 1.29 m (4.2 ft), the others are 1.04 m (3.4 ft). The square prayer chamber features three entrances on each side except the west. The largest entrance, measuring 1.40 m (4.6 ft) in width, is located at the center of the eastern side. The central entrances on the north and south sides are slightly narrower, each 1.34 m (4.4 ft) wide. Flanking each side, the smallest entrances measure 1.00 meter in width. The mosque is built in Khan Jahan Ali style.

=== Inscription ===
Mosque inscription Arabic mentions the construction during the reign of Barbak Shah and date which could not be read properly due to damage. The inscription reads as follows:

"The Prophet, peace and blessings of Allah be upon him has said, ‘He who builds a mosque, Allah builds (for him) seventy palaces in Paradise’. This mosque was built in the reign of the great Sultan Rukn al-Dunya wal-Din Abil Muzaffar Barbak Shah, son of Mahmud Shah the Sultan; it was built by the great Khan Ajyal Khan, son of Munjh ... Malaku Mazhar al-Din ... Dated in the months of 87 ... ? [1465-74?]."

== Gallery ==
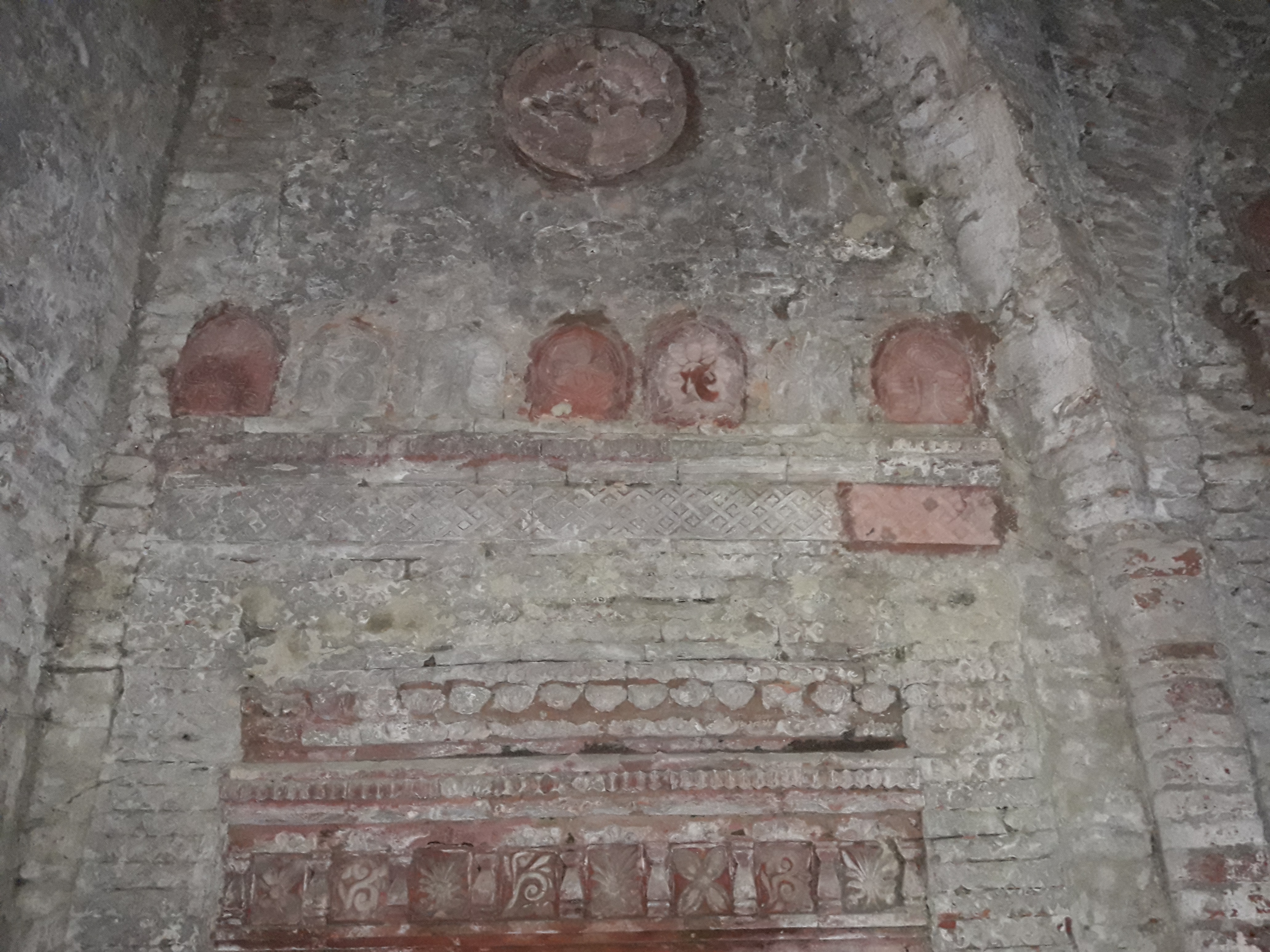
Motifs

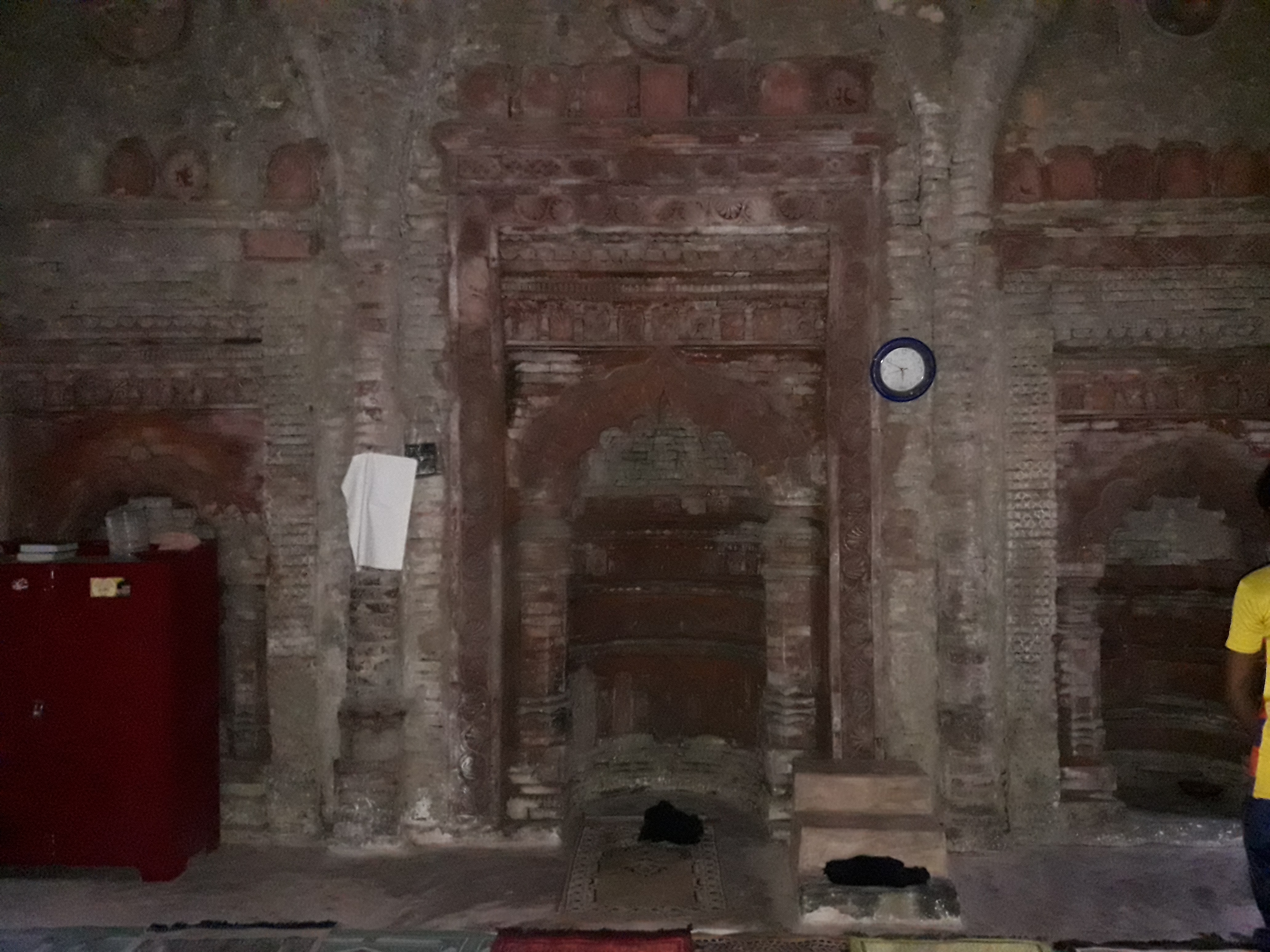
Mihrab

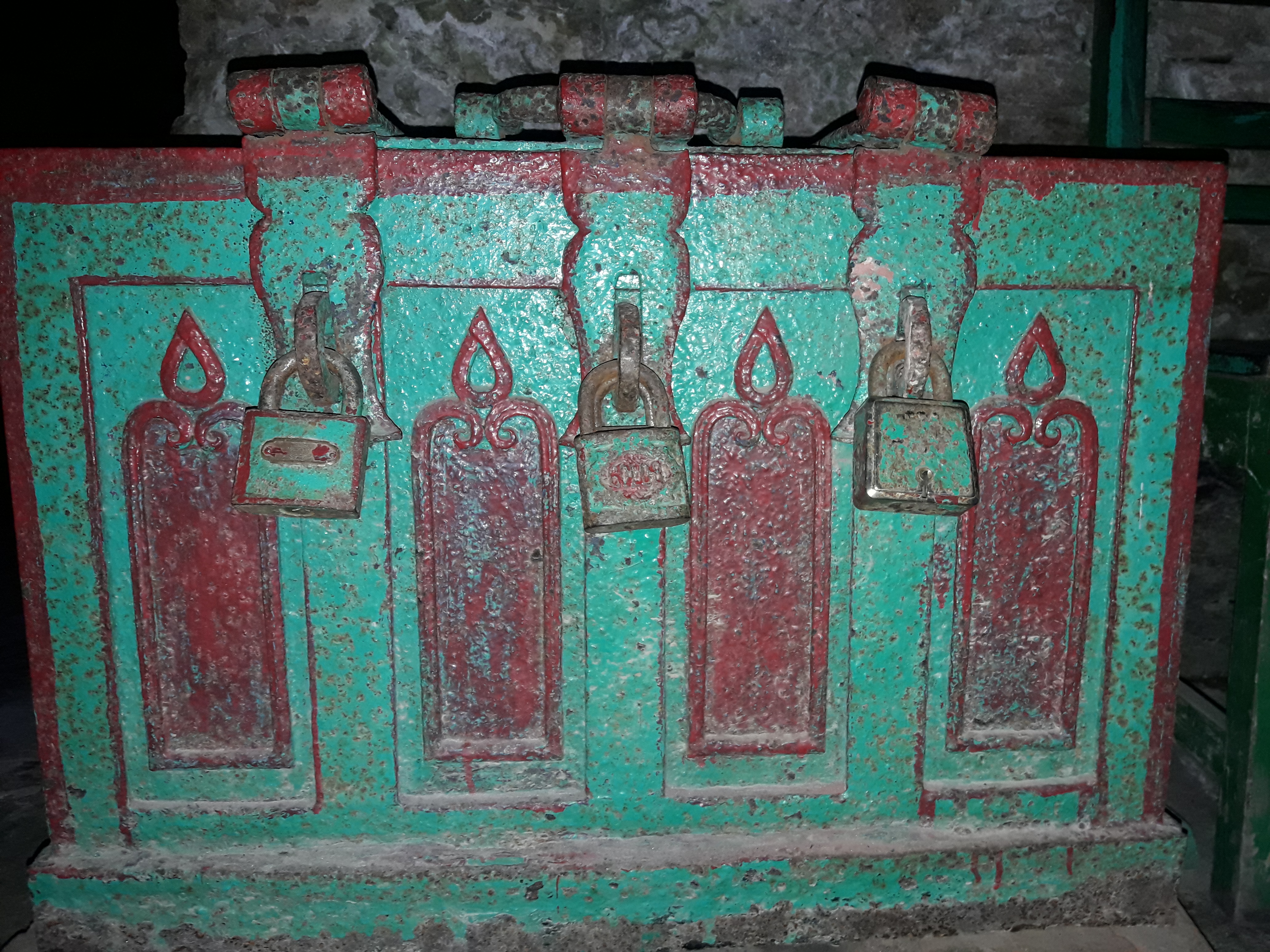
Chest

== See also ==
- Islam in Bangladesh
- List of mosques in Bangladesh
- List of archaeological sites in Bangladesh
