= Lattan Mosque =

Former mosque in West Bengal, India

Lottan Masjid
- লোটন মসজিদ
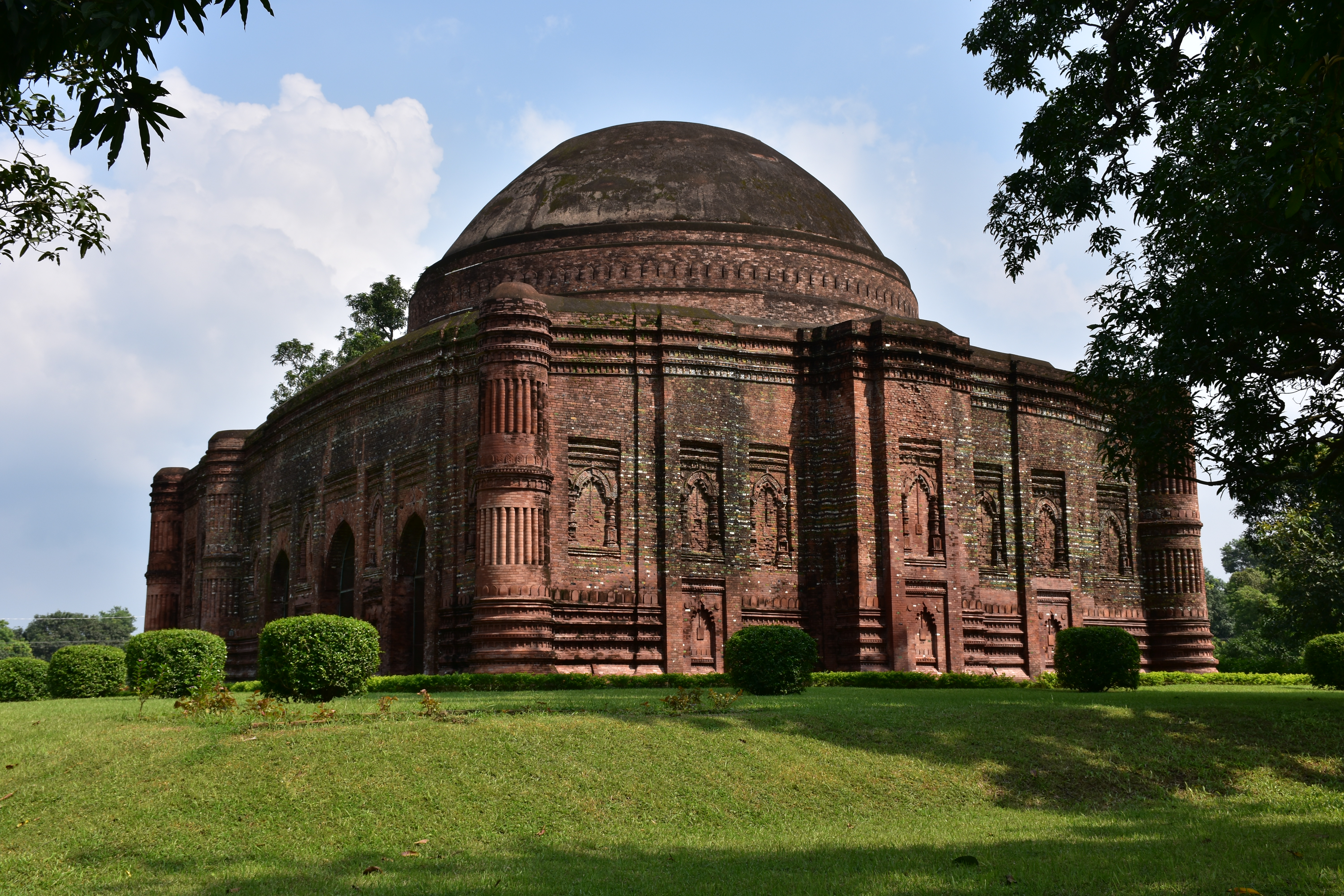

- Location of the former mosque in West Bengal

Religion
- Affiliation: Islam (former)
- Ecclesiastical or organizational status: Mosque (former)
- Status: Inactive (as a mosque)

Location
- Location: Gour Road, Gour, Malda, West Bengal
- Country: India
- Interactive map of Lottan Masjid
- Administration: Archaeological Survey of India
- Coordinates: 24°52′58″N 88°07′41″E

Architecture
- Type: Mosque architecture
- Style: Bengal Sultanate
- Established: c. 1493-1519

Specifications
- Length: 21.95 m (72.0 ft)
- Width: 15.54 m (51.0 ft)
- Dome: 1
- Materials: Brick

Monument of National Importance
- Official name: Lottan Masjid
- Reference no.: N-WB-92

The Lattan Mosque (Bengali: লোটন মসজিদ) or Painted Mosque, officially known as Lottan Masjid is a historical mosque located between the Tantipara Mosque and the Bridge of Five Arches in Gaur, Malda District, West Bengal. Built during the period of Hussain Shahi sultans between (c. 1493-1519), the mosque stands out as one of the best preserved monuments in ancient city of Gaur.

== History ==
The mosque is stylistically dated to the late 15th or early 16th century and is thought to have been constructed during the Husain Shahi period. An inscription found in the vicinity indicates it may have been built by Sultan Shamsuddin Yusuf Shah (r. 1474–1481) in 1475. Alexander Cunningham describes the inscription of the Chamkatti Mosque instead. Although the exact date of the mosque's construction is not known, historians assume the mosque was built somewhere between 1493 and 1519.

According to local tradition, Yusuf Shah married a Hindu dancer called Mira (or Mirabai) who had embraced Islam and taken the name Lotan Bibi. In her name, Yusuf Shah established the Lotan Taluq (administrative subdivision) which contains the Lattan Mosque and Lotan Dighi, and that taluq existed even until the British period.

== Architecture ==
The structure is entirely constructed from brick. It comprises a square prayer chamber measuring 10.36 m (34.0 ft) on each side, adjoined by a verandah measuring 10.36 by 3.35 m (34.0 by 11.0 ft). Together, they form a rectangular platform extending 21.95 m (72.0 ft) from east to west and 15.54 m (51.0 ft) from north to south. Access to the prayer chamber is provided through three arched openings on each side, except the qibla side. The qibla wall features three semi-circular mihrab niches, recessed internally and aligned to correspond with the three eastern entrances. The interior is adorned with numerous multicolored glazed tiles. The intricately designed brick exterior was originally clad with glazed tiles, though much of this decoration has been lost.

== Gallery ==
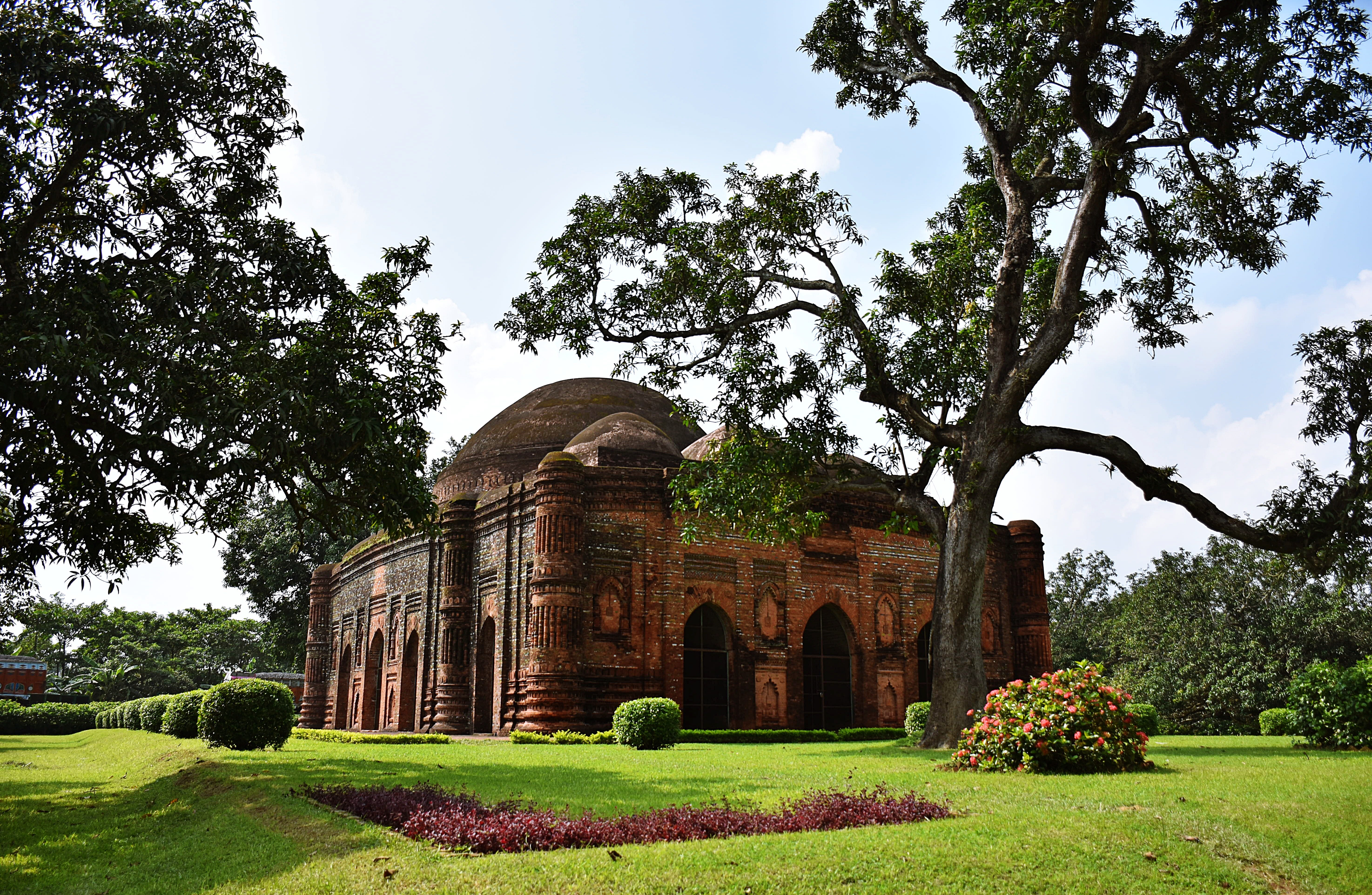
Full view of the monument

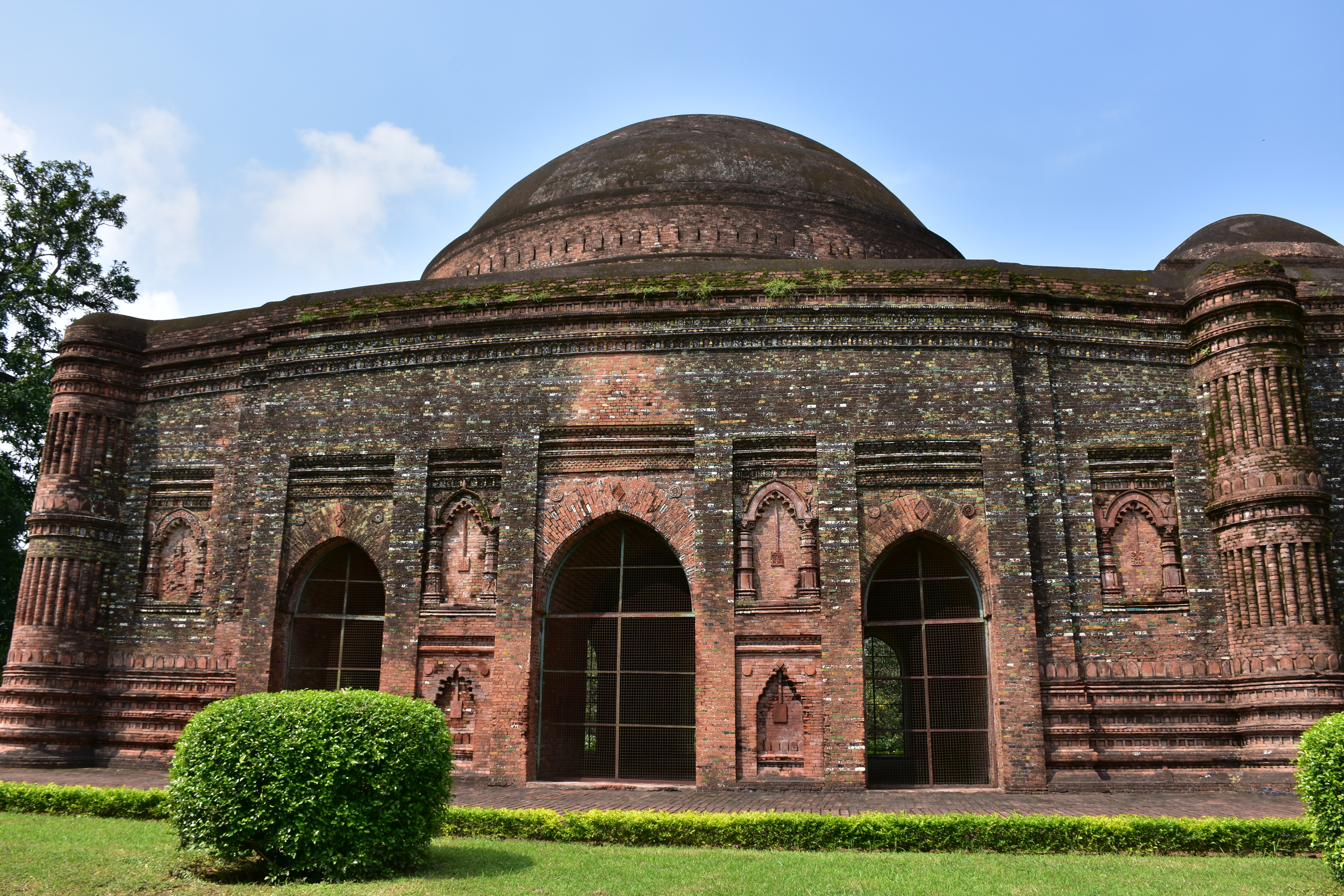
Front view

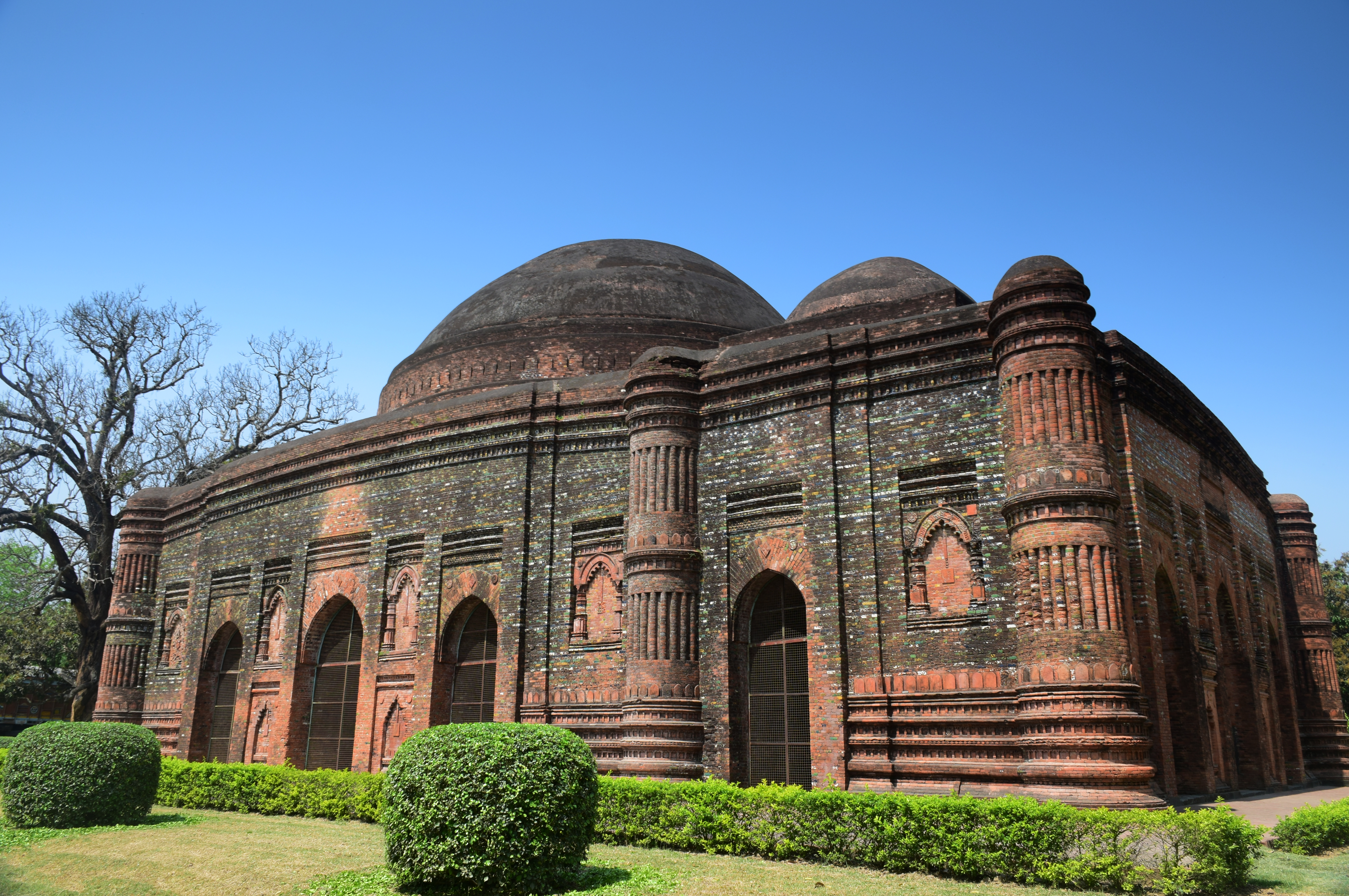
Side view

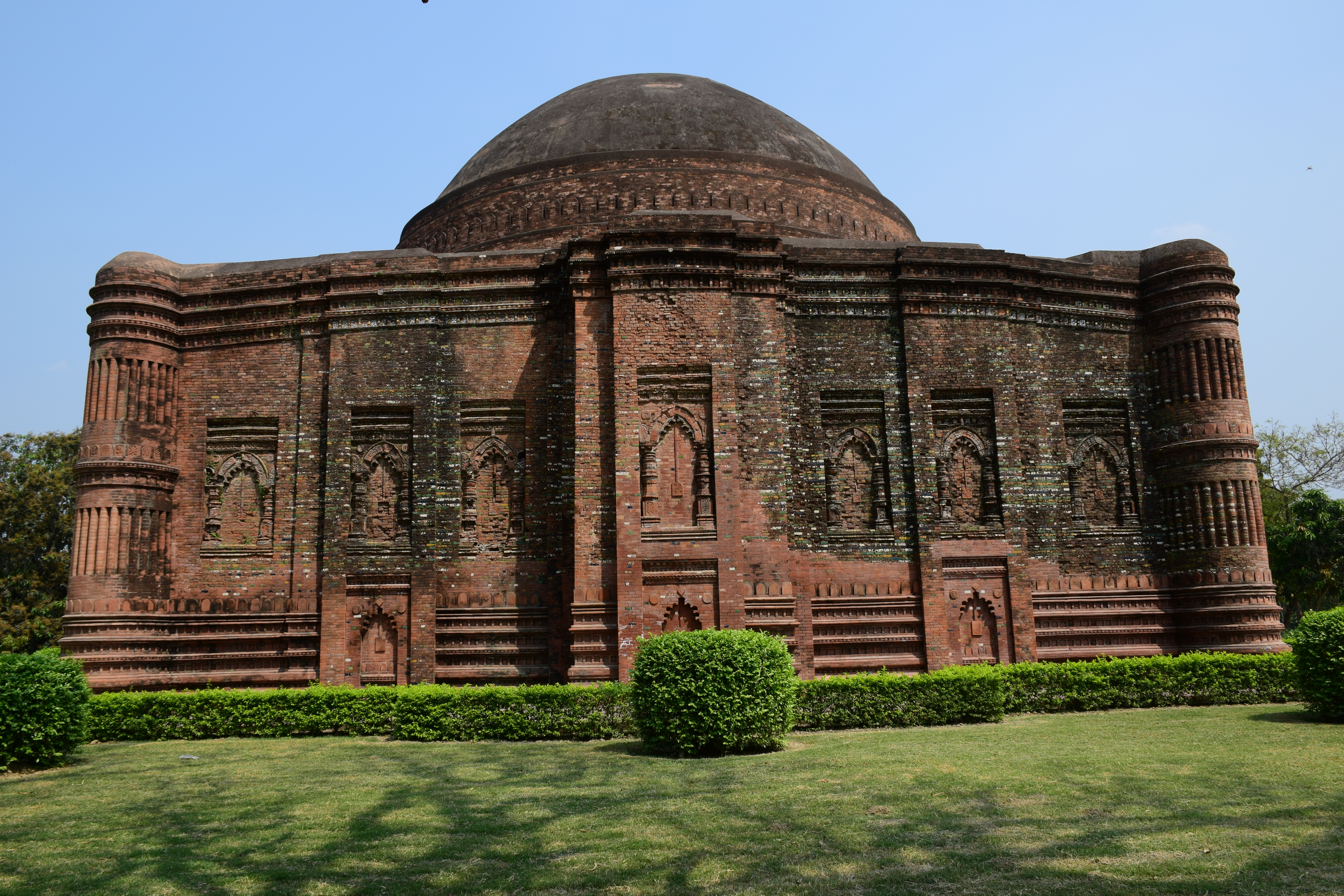
Back view

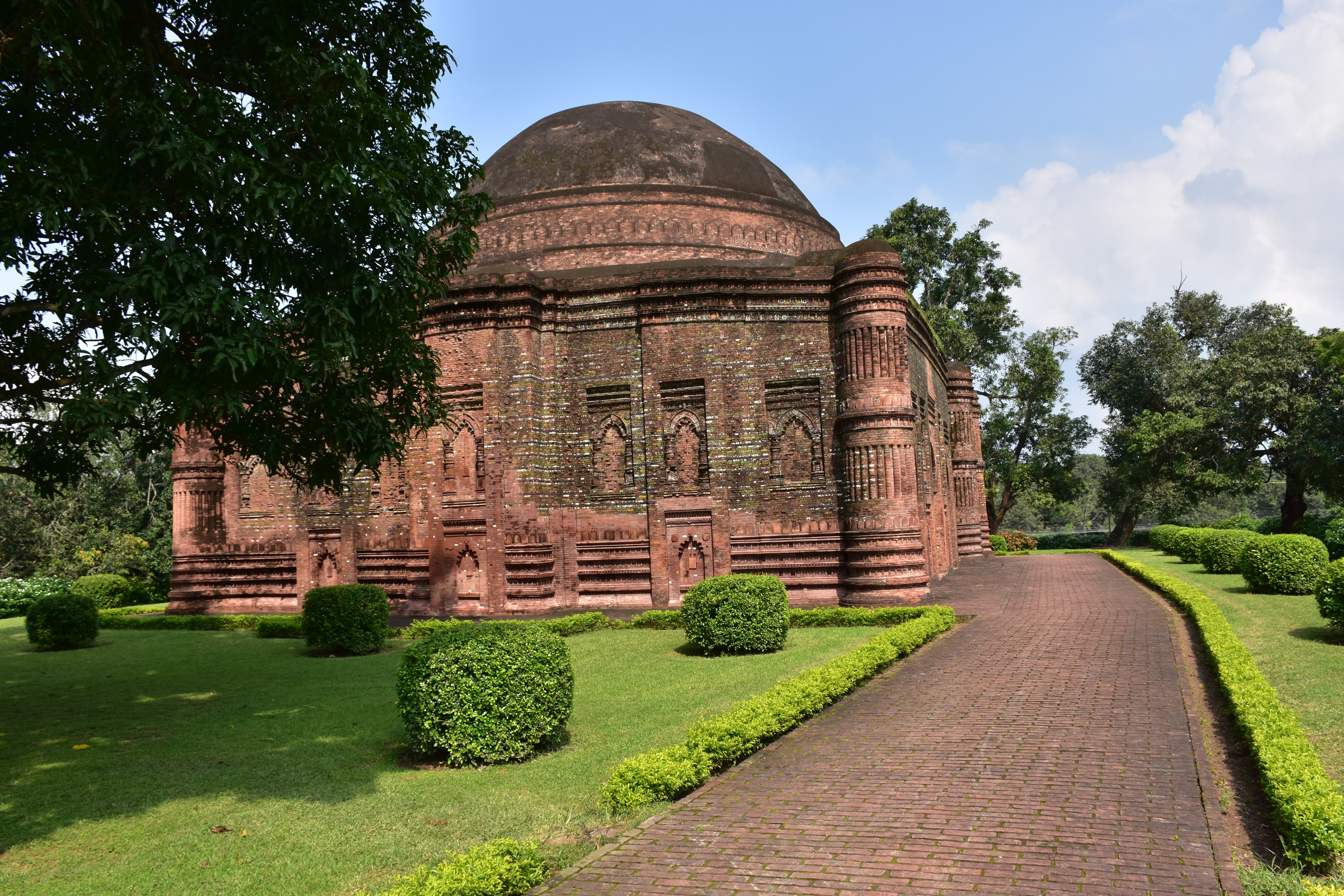
Entrance path to the mosque

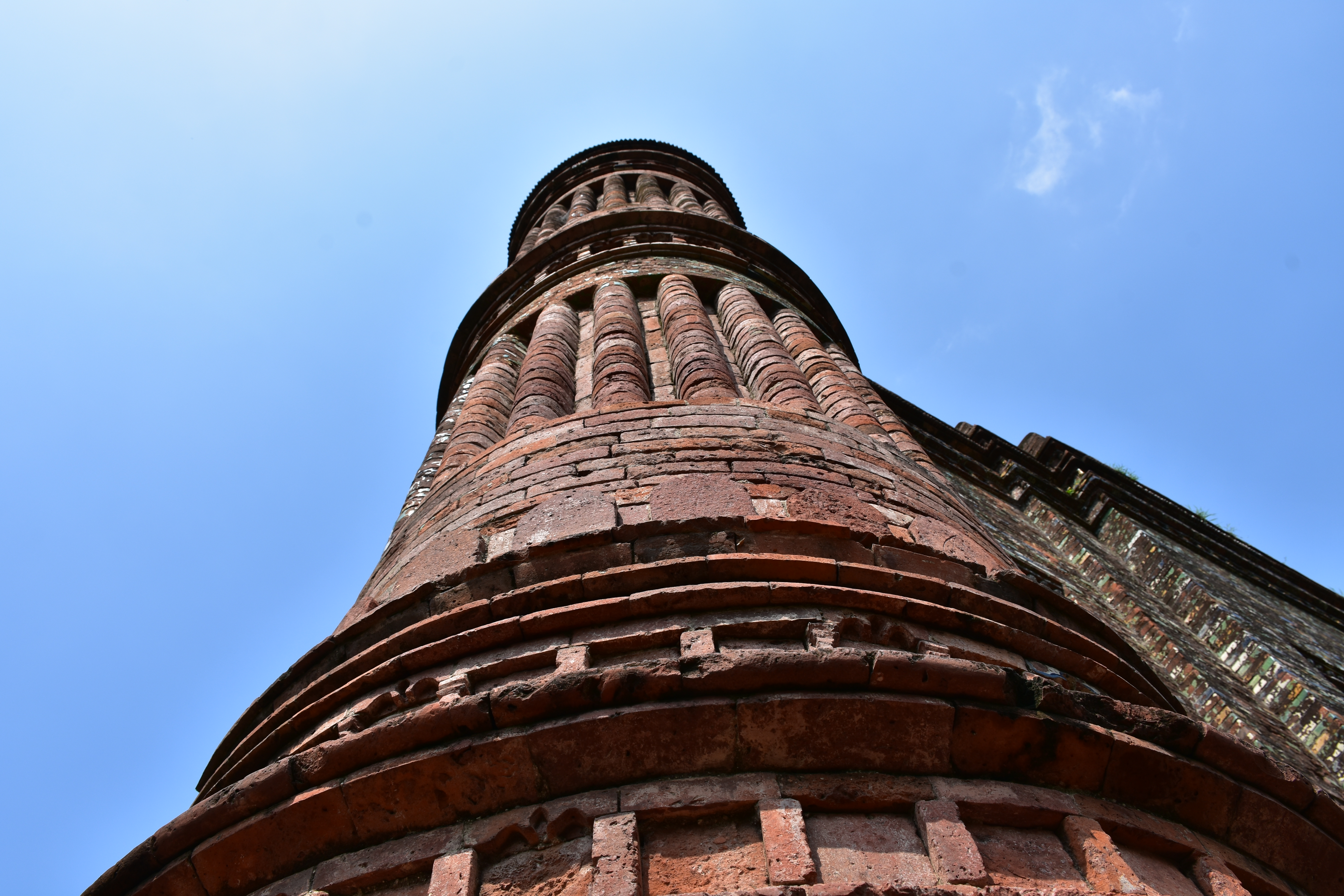
Corner pillars of Lattan Mosque

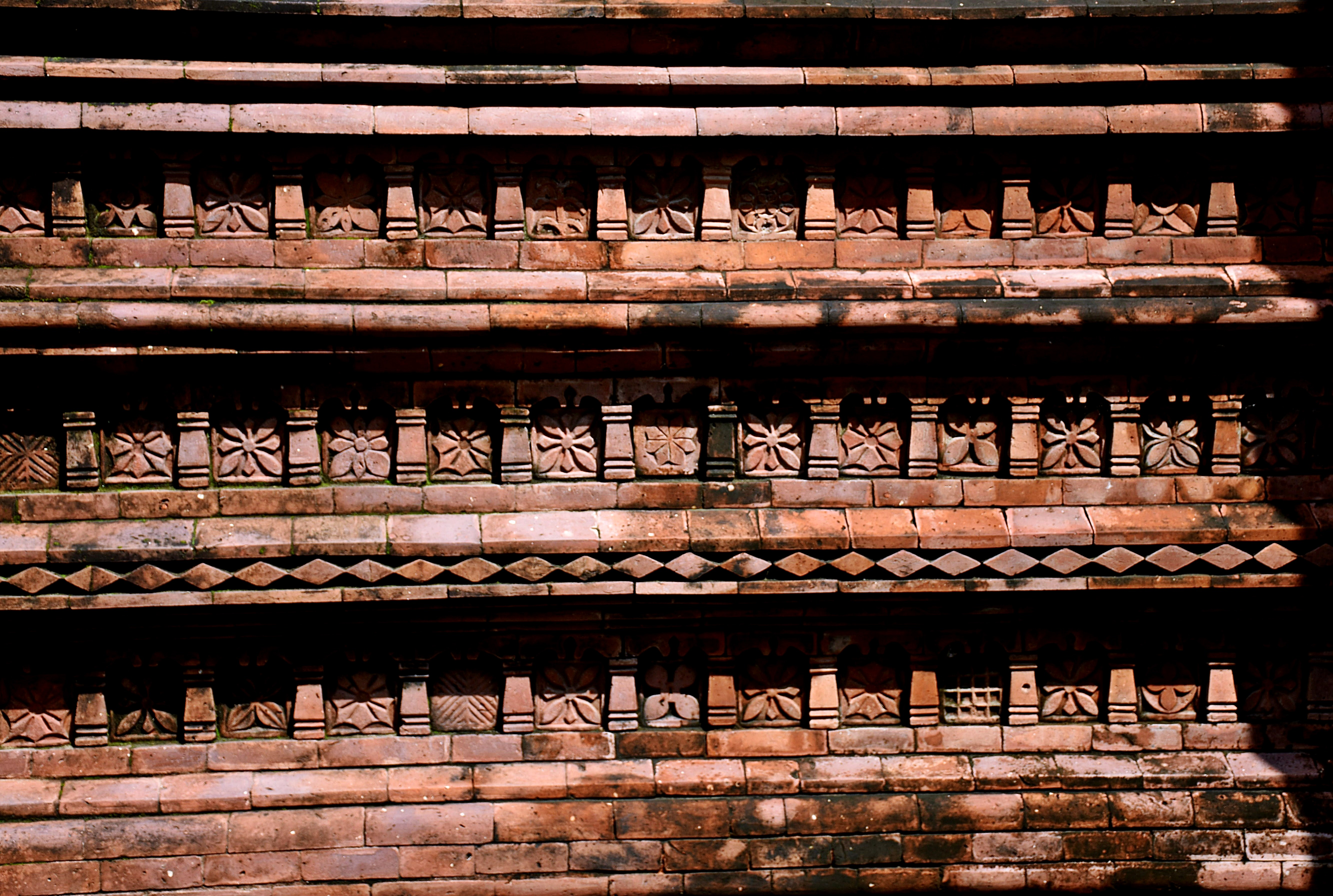
Intricate carvings on the wall

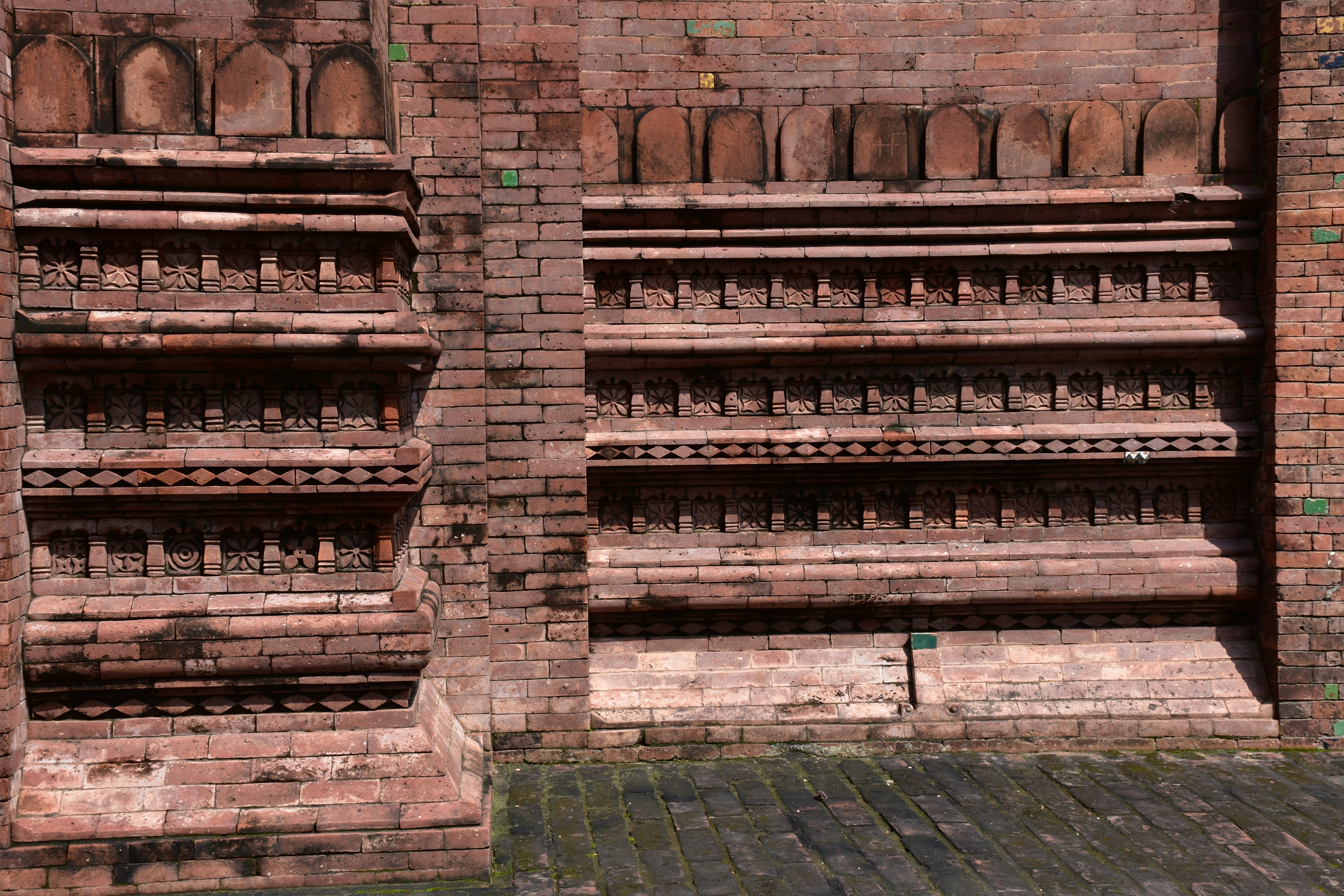
Decorated wall surface

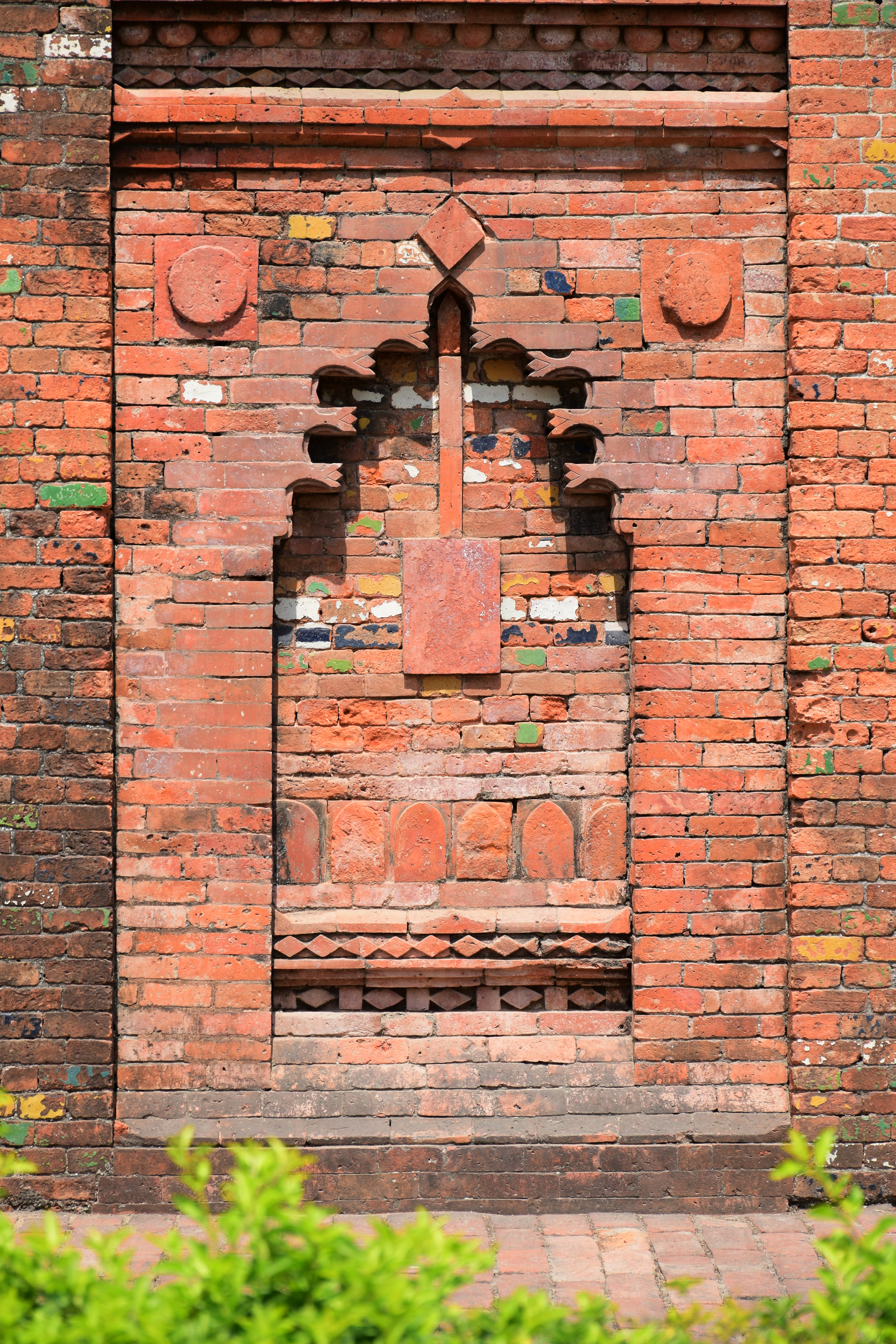
Wall architecture

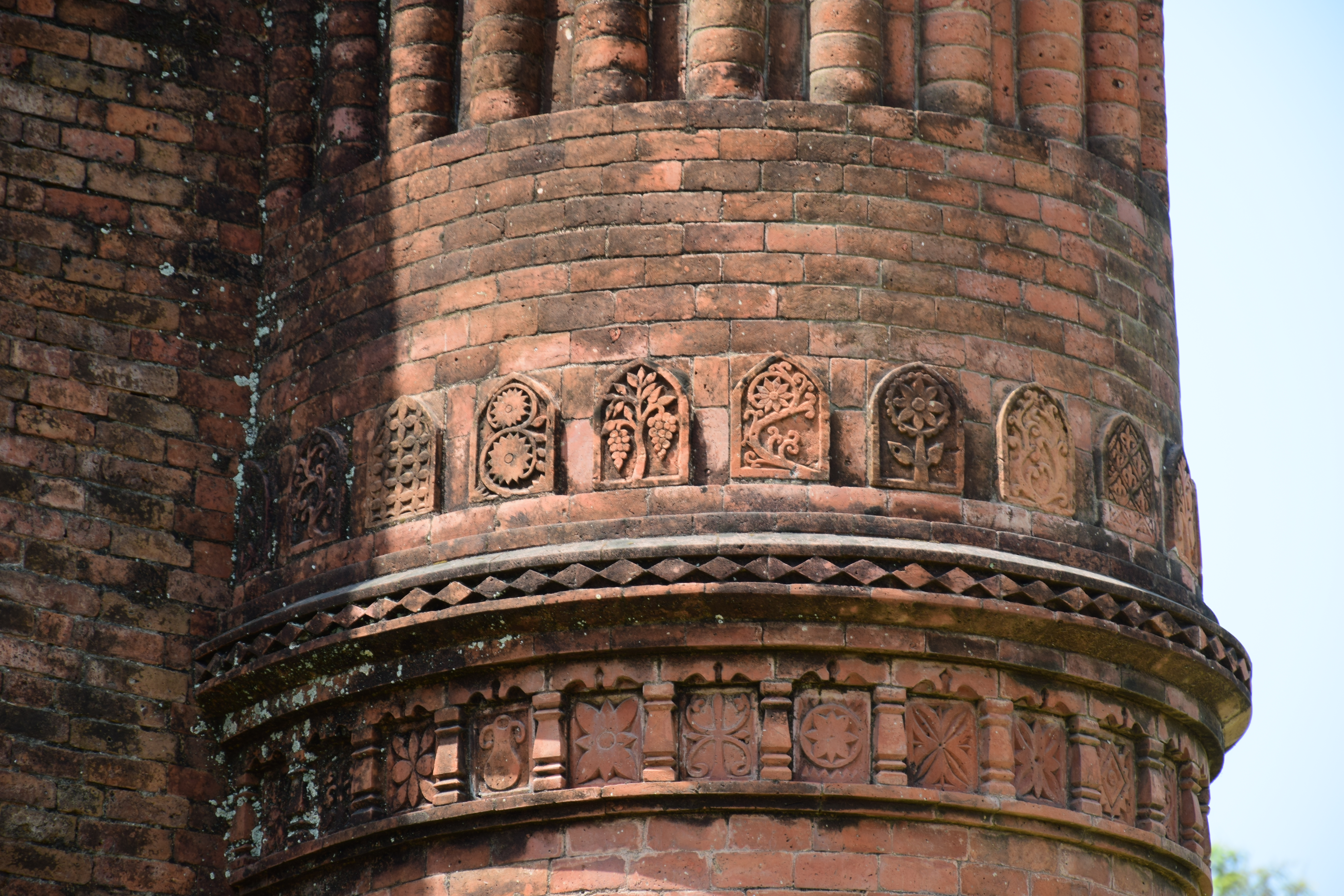
Floral designs on the corner pillar

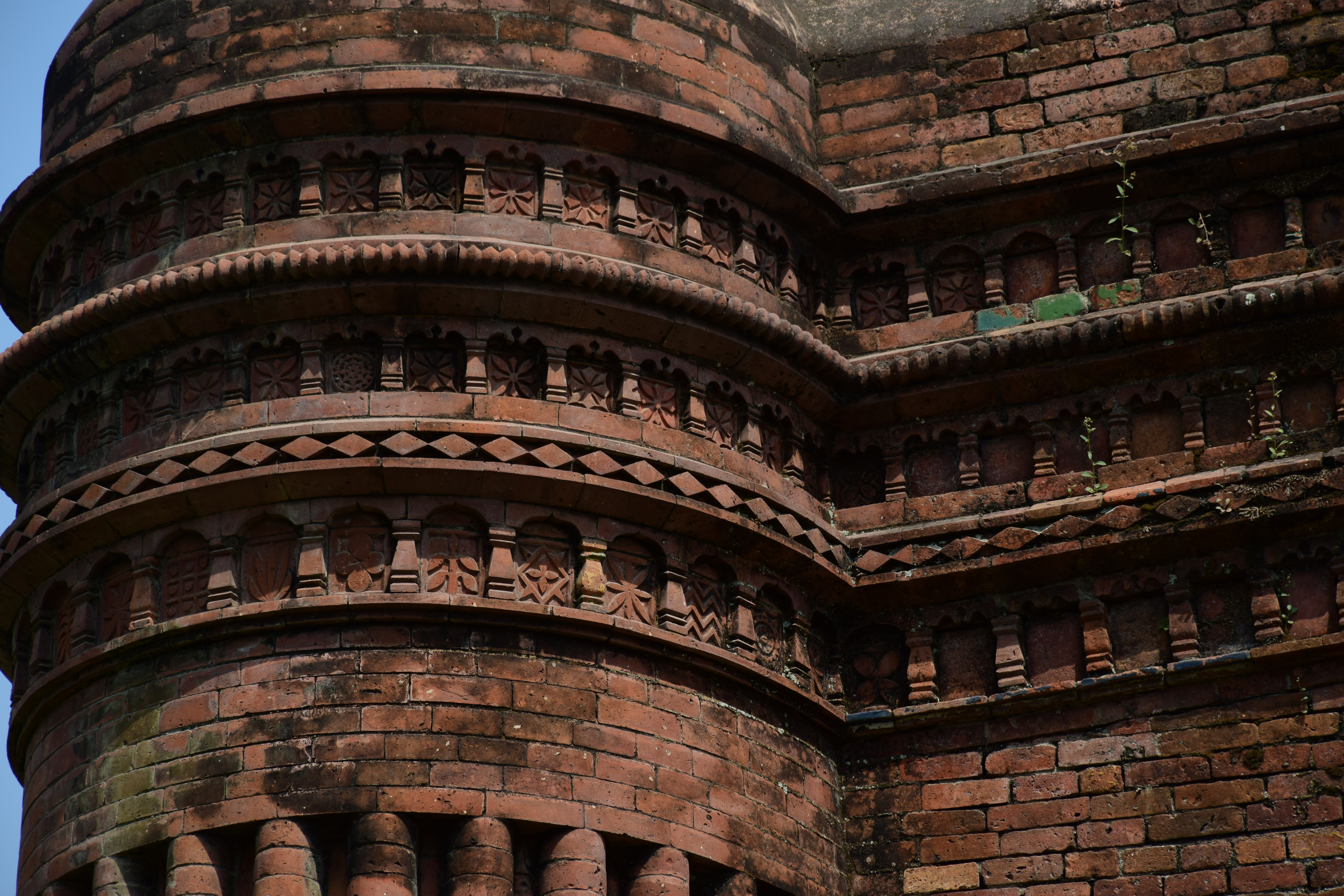
Works on pillar

== See also ==
- List of Monuments of National Importance in West Bengal
- Pandua, Malda

== Bibliography ==
- Michell, George (1984). The Islamic Heritage of Bengal. Unesco. ISBN 978-92-3-102174-9.
