= Shamsuddin Yusuf Shah =

Sultan of Bengal from 1474 to 1481

- As-Sulṭān as-Salāṭīn Shams ad-Dunyā wa ad-Dīn Abu al-Muẓaffar Yūsuf Shāh

11th Sultan of Bengal
- Reign: 1474–1481
- Coronation: 1474
- Predecessor: Rukunuddin Barbak Shah
- Successor: Nuruddin Sikandar Shah
- Born: Yusuf bin Barbak; Sonargaon, Bengal Sultanate
- Died: 1481; Gaur, Bengal Sultanate
- Burial: 1481; Gaur, Rajshahi, Bangladesh
- Spouses: Lotan Bibi
- House: Ilyas Shahi
- Father: Rukunuddin Barbak Shah
- Religion: Sunni Islam

Shamsuddin Yusuf Shah (Persian: شمس الدین یوسف شاه, Bengali: শামসউদ্দীন ইউসুফ শাহ) was the Sultan of Bengal from 1474 to 1481. He belonged to the Ilyas Shahi dynasty and was the successor of his father, Sultan Rukunuddin Barbak Shah.

== Early life and family ==
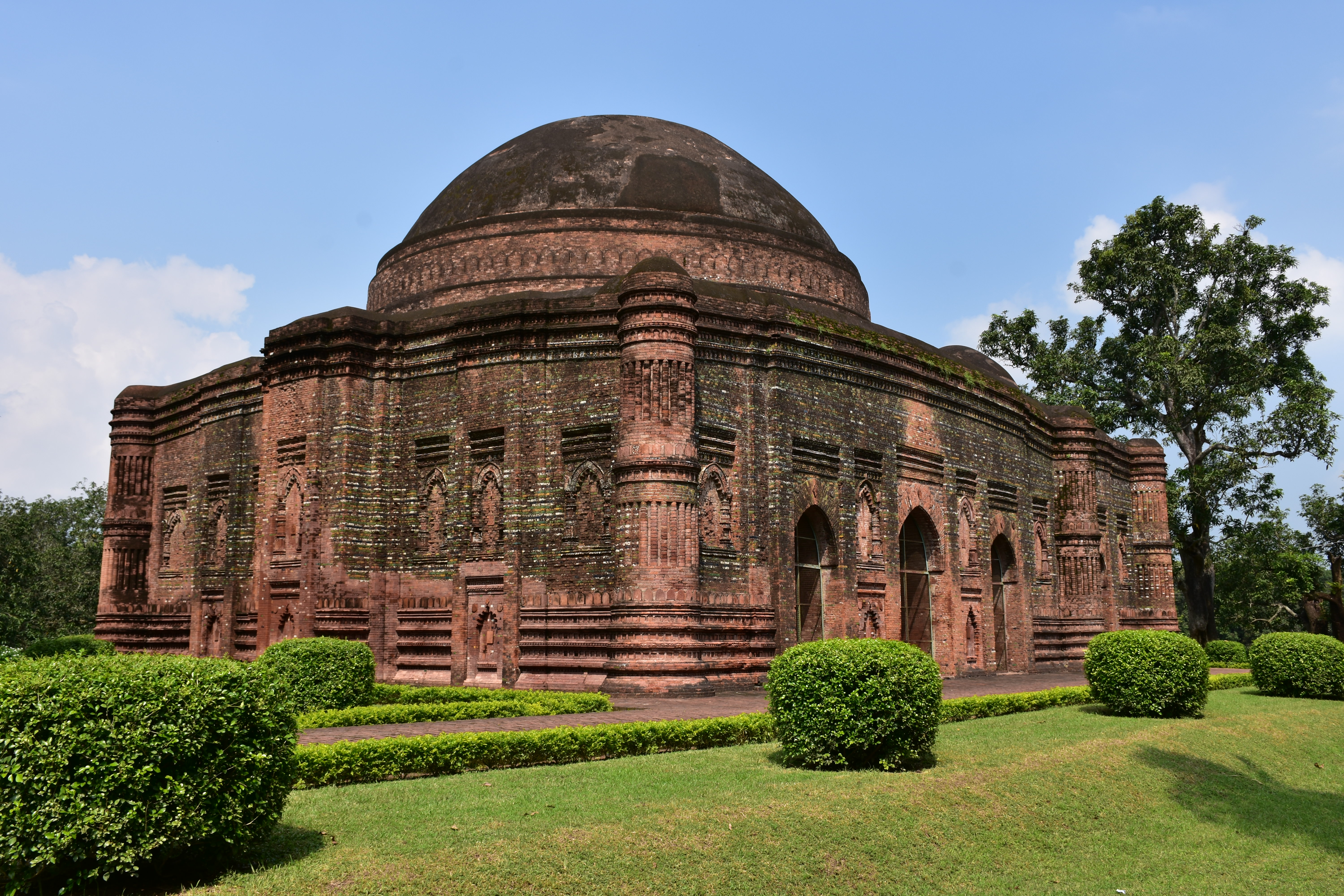
The Lottan Mosque was built after the marriage of Yusuf Shah.

Yusuf was born into a ruling class Bengali Muslim Sunni family known as the Ilyas Shahi dynasty, in the Bengal Sultanate. His father, Barbak, and his grandfather, Mahmud, were descendants of Shamsuddin Ilyas Shah – the founder of the ruling dynasty as well as the nation. Hailing from what is now eastern Iran and southern Afghanistan, Yusuf's family was of Sistani ancestral origin but had assimilated in Bengal for over a hundred years.

According to tradition, Yusuf married a Hindu dancer called Mira (or Mirabai) who had embraced Islam and taken the name Lotan Bibi. In her name, Yusuf Shah established the Lotan Taluq (administrative subdivision) which contains the Lattan Mosque and Lotan Dighi, and that taluq existed even until the British period.

== Reign ==
After the death of his father Rukunuddin Barbak Shah in 1474, Yusuf ascended the throne of Bengal stylising himself as Shams ad-Dunyā wa ad-Dīn Abu al-Muẓaffar Yūsuf Shāh. He also took other titles such as Ẓillullāh fī al-ʿĀlamīn, Khalīfatullāh bi al-Ḥujjah wa al-Burhān, As-Sulṭān as-Salāṭīn, As-Sulṭān al-ʿĀdil al-Aʿẓam, Malik ar-Riqāb wa al-Umam and Khalīfatullāh fī al-Arḍīn. He had several ministers under him such as Majlis Alam and Malik Khaqan Pahlavi and Mirṣād Khān Atābek, who constructed numerous mosques across his domain. The most notable ones were the Sakomohan Mosque in Maldah, the Faqir Mosque in Chittagong, Goyghor Mosque in Moulvibazar, the Qadam Rasul Mosque, Lattan Mosque, Tantipara Mosque and Darasbari Mosque in Gaur. He put strict Sharia law in order and prohibited drinking wine in his ruling kingdom.

According to legend, Yusuf Shah executed Shah Jalal Dakhini, a Sufi preacher who had established a khanqah in present-day Motijheel, Dhaka and gained excessive prominence and pomposity.

== Patron of Islamic culture ==
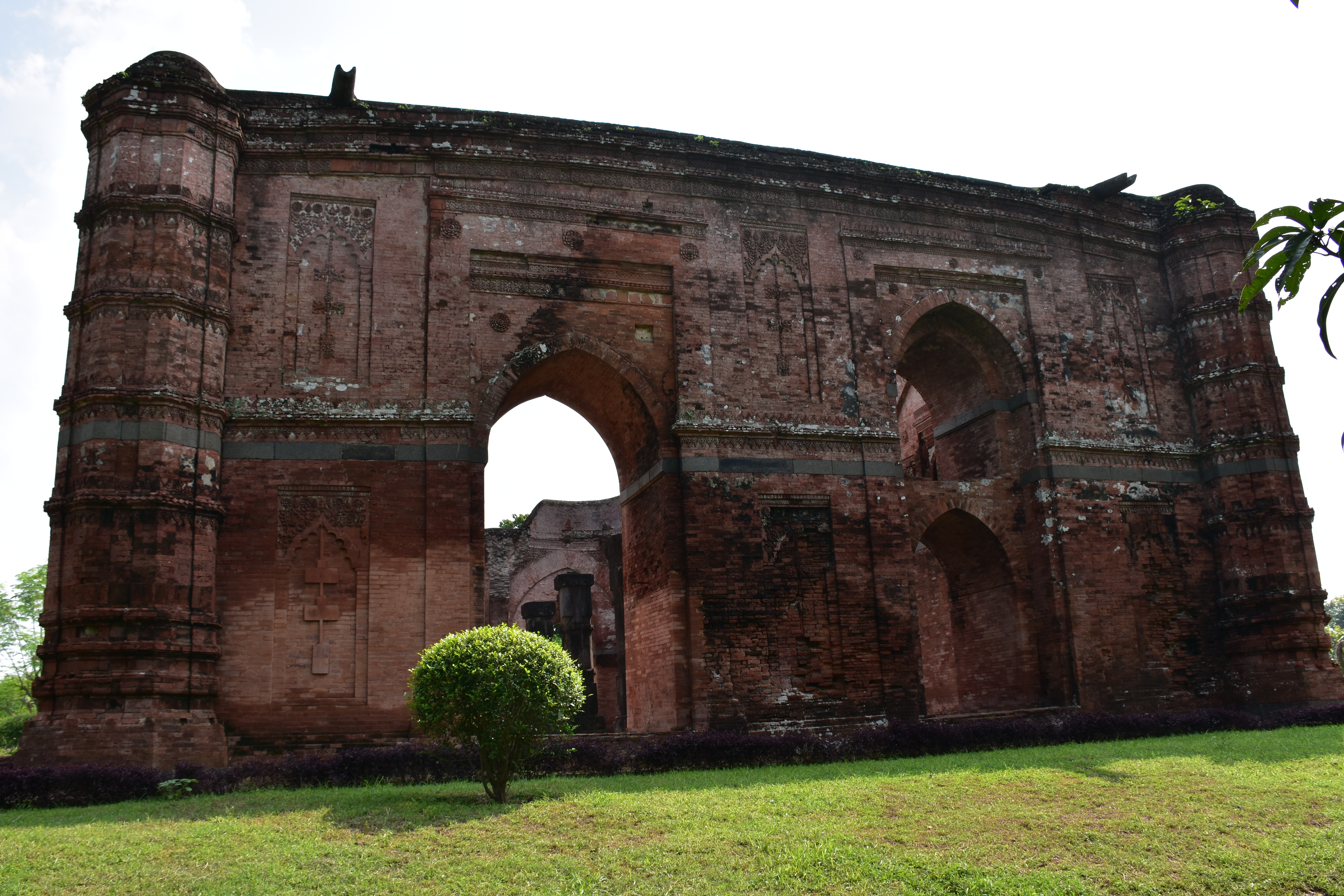
The Tantipara Mosque was established during Yusuf Shah's reign.

Yusuf Shah appreciated poetry in various languages. Upon the construction of a mosque in Dhaka District in 1480, its inscription ended with a Persian verse from Saadi Shirazi's Bustan. During his time as a prince, he was the patron of poets Zainuddin and Maladhar Basu.

== Death ==
He died in 1481 and was succeeded by his paternal uncle, Nuruddin Sikandar Shah.

Shamsuddin Yusuf Shah Ilyas Shahi
| Preceded by Barbak Shah | Sultan of Bengal; 1474–1481 | Succeeded by Nuruddin Sikandar Shah |

== See also ==
- List of rulers of Bengal
- History of Bengal
- History of India
