= Altaf Haider =

Freedom fighter

Altaf Hossain
- Born: 15 June 1937; Deuli, Backergunge District, Bengal Presidency, British India
- Died: 15 December 2020 (aged 83)
- Citizenship: Bangladesh
- Occupation: Soldier
- Awards: Bir Protik (1971)

Altaf Hossain (15 June 1937 – 15 December 2020) was a decorated freedom fighter and commander in the Bangladesh Liberation War. He was the first freedom fighter to hoist the red-green flag of independence in Patuakhali town. For his bravery and leadership during the war, he was given the title "Haider" by the sector commander. Since then, he became popularly known as Altaf Haider.

== Early life ==
Altaf Haider was born on 15 June 1937 in Deuli village, Mirzaganj Upazila, Patuakhali District.

== Role in Liberation War ==
Altaf Haider joined the then Pakistan Army in 1963. He served as a naik in the battlefields of Sialkot during the Indo-Pak war of 1965. After floods hit the coastal areas in the 1970s, he returned to his locality and later participated in the Bangladesh Liberation War in 1971 under Sector 9. On 8 December 1971, he hoisted the red-green flag of independent Bangladesh in Patuakhali for the first time. During the war, he served as the commander of Mirzaganj Upazila and Bauphal region of Patuakhali District.

== Death ==
He died on 15 December 2020 at 9:50 pm in his native village, Deuli in Mirzaganj Upazila. The following day, he was buried with state honors at his family graveyard after a funeral prayer held at the field of Polli Mongol High School in Deuli village. He was 83 years old at the time of his death.
