= Faqir Mosque =

Mosque in Chittagong, Bangladesh

- ফকির মসজিদ
- Location of the mosque in Bangladesh

Religion
- Affiliation: Sunni Islam
- Sect: Sufism
- Ecclesiastical or organizational status: Mosque
- Status: Active

Location
- Location: Dewannagar, Hathazari Upazila, Chittagong District
- Country: Bangladesh
- Interactive map of Faqir Mosque
- Coordinates: 22°30′08″N 91°48′22″E

Architecture
- Type: Mosque architecture
- Style: Islamic architecture; Bengal Sultanate
- Groundbreaking: 1474 CE
- Completed: 1481 CE

Specifications
- Capacity: 100 worshipers
- Length: 6.5 m (21 ft)
- Width: 6.5 m (21 ft)
- Dome: Six
- Minaret: Four
- Materials: Brick

The Faqir Mosque (Bengali: ফকির মসজিদ; Arabic: مسجد الفقير) is a Sunni Sufi mosque, located in Hathazari Upazila, in the Chittagong District of Bangladesh. The fifteenth-century mosque dates from the Bengal Sultanate period. The mosque is situated in the Mouza of Dewannagar.

== History ==
There is a broken inscription found in the premises which states that the mosque was constructed during the reign of the Sultan of Bengal Shamsuddin Yusuf Shah (r. 1474–1481). The mosque was supposedly abandoned for decades, hidden behind the dense bushes and jungle forestry. A faqir by the name of Sufi Muqim Shah was said to have rediscovered it and more worshippers started using the mosque. Muqim Shah's tomb is located adjacent to the mosque, and the mosque came to be known as Fakir Mosque.

Moulvi Hamidullah Khan mentioned this mosque in his Aḥādīth al-Khawānīn (1853). Historian Abdul Karim also gave a description of the mosque and it's inscription. The mosque was renovated from 1993 to 1994.

== Architecture ==
The double-aisle mosque measures 14.63 by 10.66 metres (48.0 by 35.0 ft) on the outside and 11.65 by 7.54 metres (38.2 by 24.7 ft) on the inside. On its four corners are four conjoined minarets and the central mihrab in a half-height adjoining tower cell. All the towers or minarets of the mosque are octagonal in shape, which rise above the roof and are covered with a small dome. The east wall has three very low and pointed exterior arches. The prayer hall is divided into three courtyards by two pillars. The central mihrab is larger than the other two side mihrabs. Its niche is adorned with chains and bell motifs. The mosque has six domes.

== See also ==
- Islam in Bangladesh
- List of mosques in Bangladesh
