= Akhtar Hossain Choudhury Memorial Degree College =

Coordinates: 22.4639°N 90.2786°E

Akhtar Hossain Choudhury Memorial College
- আখতার হোসেন চৌধুরী মেমোরিয়াল কলেজ
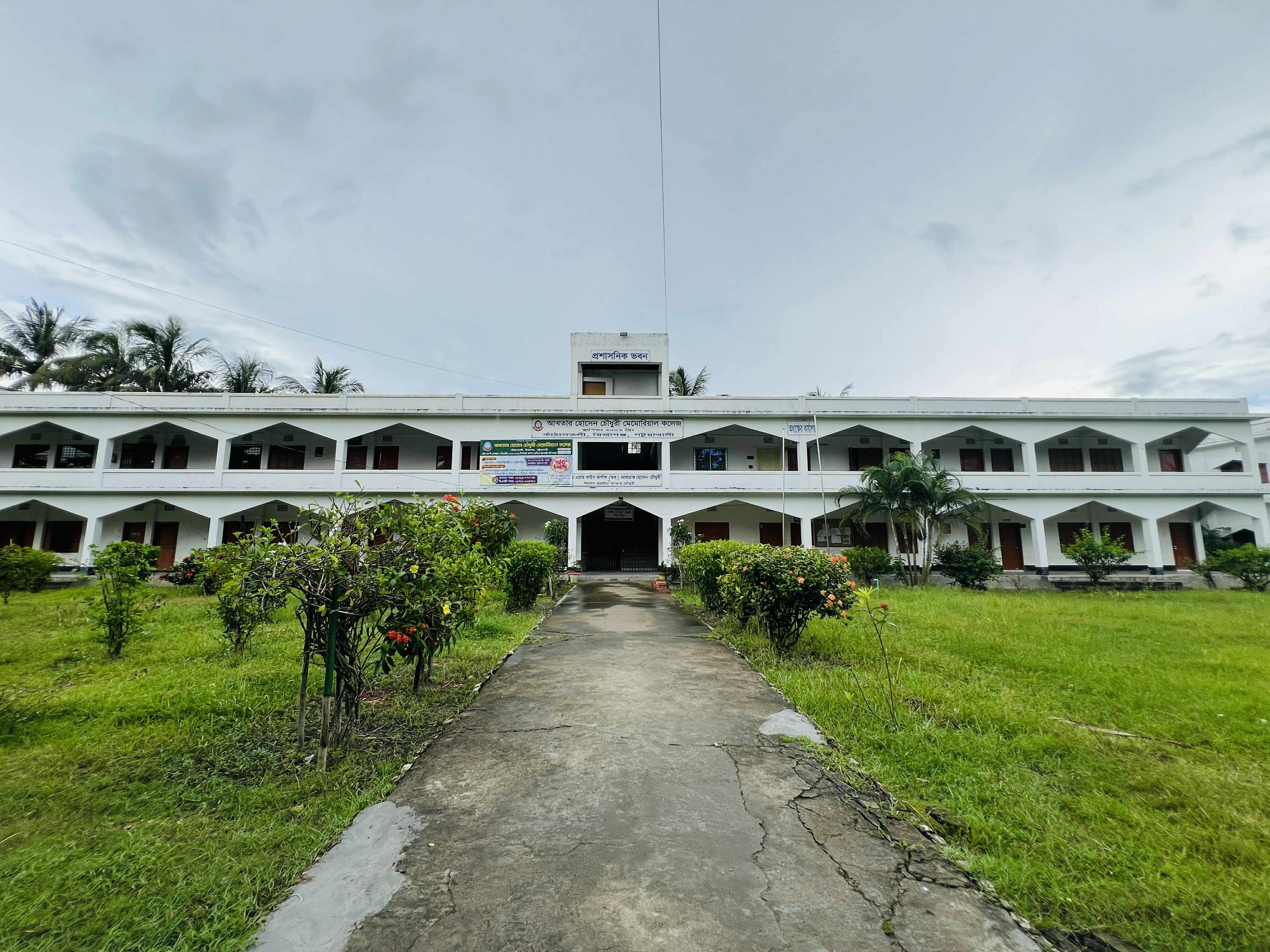
- Other name: AHCMC
- Motto: Unity knowledge discipline
- Established: July 1, 2002
- Founder: Altaf Hossain Chowdhury
- Academic affiliations: National University
- Principal: Manikur Rahman Siddique (Acting)
- Academic staff: 35
- Total staff: 60
- Students: about 2500+
- Location: Mirzaganj, Patuakhali, Bangladesh
- Campus: Suburban
- Language: Bangla
- Website: https://ahcmc.edu.bd

Akhtar Hossain Choudhury Memorial College (AHCMC) (Bengali: আখতার হোসেন চৌধুরী মেমোরিয়াল ডিগ্রি কলেজ) is a degree college situated in Mirzaganj Upazila, Patuakhali District, Bangladesh. It was established in 2002 by Air Vice Marshal (Retd) Altaf Hossain Choudhury, former Home Minister and Begum Suraiya Akhtar Choudhury, in memoriam to his deceased son Akhtar Hossain. The college provides education under the national curriculum.

== Campus ==
The college is located in a suburban area, North frontier of Mirzagonj Upazila where Bakergonj Upazila bordar intersects. Dhaka-Barguna highway road runs along its front boundary wall. All buildings of the college are facing to the West creating a north–south long row standing side by side. Behind the academic buildings there is a lake along with a bridge over it. It covers almost one-third of the campus.

== Uniform ==
For boys:

1. Sky-blue shirt
2. Black pant

For girls:

1. Black salwar
2. Black scarf
3. Sky-blue kameez
4. Sky-blue belt
