= Zainuddin (poet) =

15th-century Bengali poet

- জৈনুদ্দীন
- Born: 15th century (Note: exact date unknown); Bengal Sultanate (present day West Bengal and Bangladesh)
- Died: 15th century (Note: exact date unknown); Bengal Sultanate (present day West Bengal and Bangladesh)
- Occupations: Poet, Writer
- Years active: 15th century
- Era: Medieval period
- Known for: Medieval Bengali poetry; Sufi literary tradition
- Notable work: Rasul Bijay

Zainuddin (Bengali: জৈনুদ্দীন or জএনুদ্দিন) was a medieval Bengali poet of the 15th century. He was under the patronage of Prince Yusuf Khan, who would later become the Sultan of Bengal.

== Early life and education ==
Zainuddin was born into a Bengali Muslim family in the 15th century. His father, Moinuddin, claimed descent from Abu Bakr, a companion of Muhammad and the inaugural Rashidun Caliph. Zainuddin was a Sufi murid, and his pir was Shah Muhammad Khan.

== Career ==
Between 1472 and 1473, Zainuddin composed a fictional tale titled Rasul Bijay, the source of which is said to have been a novel in the Persian language. Its plot consisted of a war in which Jaikum, a fictional king of Iraq, was defeated by the Muslims who were led by Muhammad. The book was sponsored by Yusuf Khan, the son of Sultan Rukunuddin Barbak Shah of the Ilyas Shahi dynasty.
