= Ruknuddin Barbak Shah =

Sultan of Bengal from 1459 to 1474

- as-Sulṭān al-ʿĀdil Rukn ad-Dunyā wa ad-Dīn Abū al-Mujāhid Bārbak Shāh

10th Sultan of Bengal
- Reign: 1459–1474
- Coronation: 1459
- Predecessor: Nasiruddin Mahmud Shah
- Successor: Shamsuddin Yusuf Shah
- Born: Bārbak bin Maḥmūd; Satgaon, Bengal Sultanate
- Died: 1474; Gaur, Bengal Sultanate
- Burial: 1474; Gaur, Bengal Sultanate
- Issue: Yusuf
- House: Ilyas Shahi
- Father: Nasiruddin Mahmud Shah
- Religion: Sunni Islam

Ruknuddīn Bārbak Shāh (Bengali: রোকনউদ্দীন বারবক শাহ, Persian: رکن الدین باربک شاه; r. 1459–1474) was the son and successor of Sultan Nasiruddin Mahmud Shah. Initially appointed as the governor of Satgaon during the reign of his father, Barbak ascended the throne of the Bengal Sultanate in 1459. He was the first ruler to give prominent roles in the Sultanate's administration to the Abyssinian community. Historian Aniruddha Ray credits Barbak Shah as the pioneer of urbanisation in Bengal.

== Early life and ascension ==
Barbak was born into the aristocratic Bengali Muslim Sunni Ilyas Shahi dynasty, which founded the Bengal Sultanate in 1352 CE. Although the dynasty had long been established in Bengal, its founder, Ilyas Shah, claimed to be of partial Sistani origin. Sistan is a historical region spanning present-day eastern Iran and southern Afghanistan. Barbak's father, Sultan Nasiruddin Mahmud Shah, ruled the Bengal Sultanate for over twenty years.

During his father's reign, Barbak served as the governor of Satgaon (Arsah Sajla Mankhbad). During his governorship in 1455, Ulugh Ajmal Khan erected a inscription at Zafar Khan Ghazi Mosque in Tribeni. Barbak inherited the throne of the country in 1459 CE, after his father's death.

== Reign ==
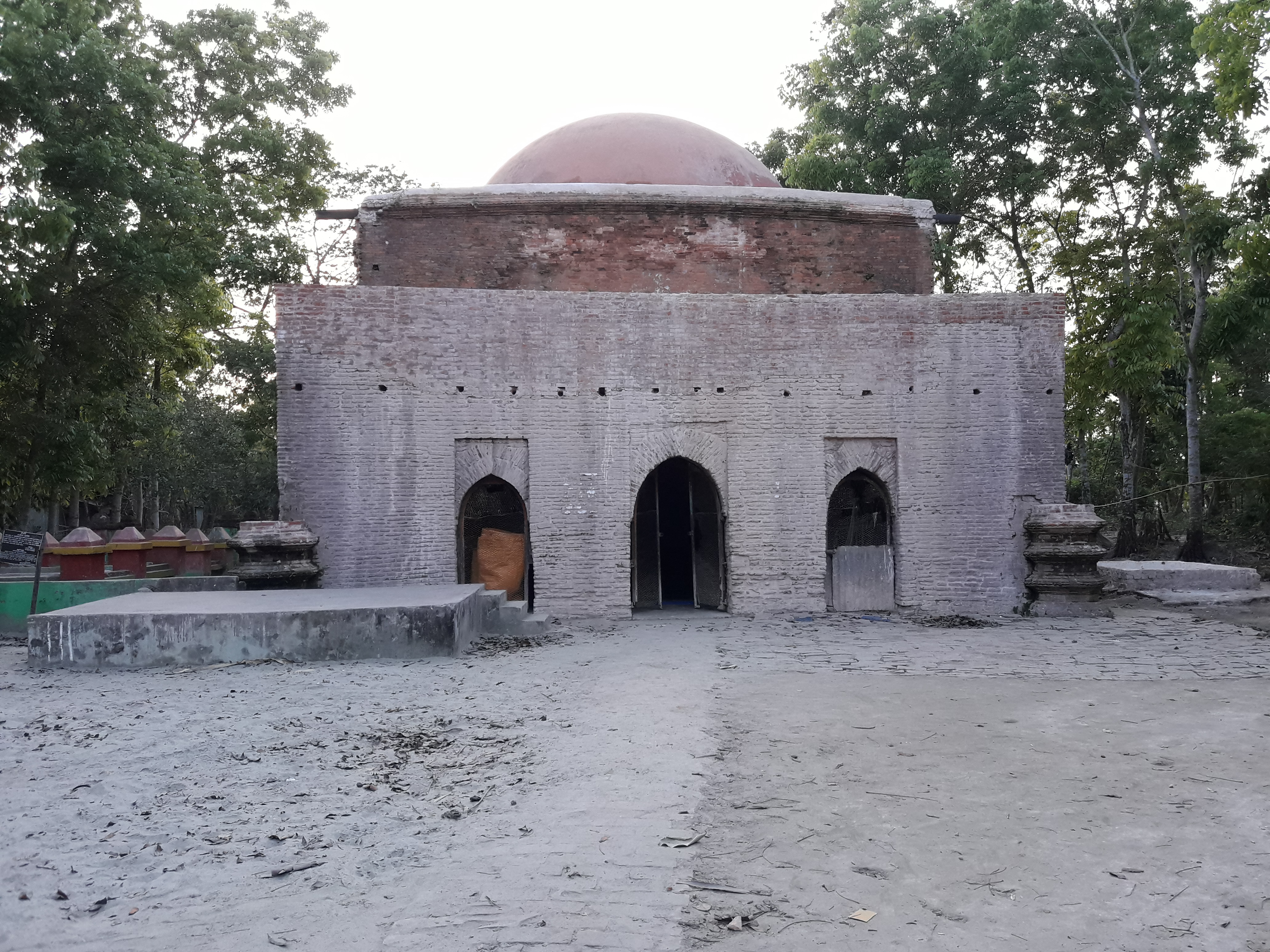
The Majidbaria Shahi Mosque, built during Barbak Shah's reign, is the first mosque and brick building in the Bakla (Barisal) region.

In 1459, Barbak upgraded Mahisantosh into a mint town known as Barbakabad. This acquisition helped his kingdom extended to the Buriganga river in north. In 1474, he re-established his authority in Chittagong. The extent of Barbak Shah's kingdom can be discovered through various inscriptions commemorating the construction of jame mosques and royal gates across Malda, Rajshahi, Rangpur, Chittagong, Dhaka, Sylhet, Mymensingh and for the first time, Barisal.

Barbak Shah was a patron of Bengali and Persian literature. During his time Zainuddin wrote his Rasul Bijay and Ibrahim Qawwam Faruqi composed a Persian lexicon Farhang-i-Ibrahim (known as Sharafnamah). Raimukuta Brhaspati Mishra, Maladhar Basu, Krittibas Ojha and Kuladhar were the most noted Hindu scholars that time.

=== Warfare ===
Barbak was the first ruler in Bengal to recruit large numbers of Habshis (Abyssinians) to the administration of the royal palace and army, which would eventually lead to a Habshi usurp permanently ending the Ilyas Shahi dynasty several years after Barbak's death. According to the 17th-century work Risalat ash-Shuhada, Raja Kapilendra Deva (r. 1434–1467) of the Gajapati Kingdom (present-day Orissa) invaded southern Bengal during the early years of Sultan Barbak's reign and managed to capture the fort of Mandaran. Barbak sent his military general, the Muslim missionary Shah Ismail Ghazi, who defeated the Gajapati army and recovered Fort Mandaran.

The Sultanate's next expedition was against Kameshwar of Kamarupa who had gained control of eastern Dinajpur. Barbak's army, again led by general Ismail Ghazi, suffered a heavy defeat in Mahisantosh, although Kameshwar was impressed by the general's spiritual characteristics and embraced Islam. In January 1474 CE however, Barbak executed Ismail Ghazi after a malicious instigation led by Bhandsi Rai, who commanded the Sultanate's Ghoraghat frontier. Rai had accused Ghazi of attempting to establish a separate independent kingdom with Kameshwar in the regained territory.

Barbak Shah was also known to have invaded Mithila (present-day Janakpur) and conquered the region. He appointed Kedar Rai as the governor of that region. He also invaded Hajiganj Fort and surroundings at Tirhut in 1468.

== Death ==
Rukunuddin Barbak Shah died in 1474 after ruling Bengal for 15 years.

Ruknuddin Barbak Shah Ilyas Shahi
Preceded by Mahmud Shah I	Sultan of Bengal; 1459–1474	Succeeded by Yusuf Shah

== See also ==
- List of rulers of Bengal
- History of Bengal
- History of India
