= Mirzaganj Union =

Mirzaganj Union মির্জাগঞ্জ ইউনিয়ন
- Union
- Location in Bangladesh
- Country: Bangladesh
- Division: Barisal Division
- District: Patuakhali District
- Upazila: Mirzaganj Upazila

Government
  - Type: Union council

Area
  - Total: 28.06 km^{2} (10.83 sq mi)

Population (2022)
  - Total: 22,985
  - Density: 819.1/km^{2} (2,122/sq mi)
- Time zone: UTC+6 (BST)

Mirzaganj Union (Bengali: মির্জাগঞ্জ ইউনিয়ন) is a union parishad of Mirzaganj Upazila of Patuakhali District, in Barisal Division, Bangladesh.

== Demography ==
According to the 2022 Census of Bangladesh, the total population of Mirzaganj Union is 22,985. Of these, 11,115 are males and 11,870 are females. Total families 5,211.

== Education ==
According to the 2011 census, Mirzaganj Union has an average literacy rate of 58.4%.
