= Mirzaganj Upazila =

Mirzaganj মির্জাগঞ্জ
- Upazila
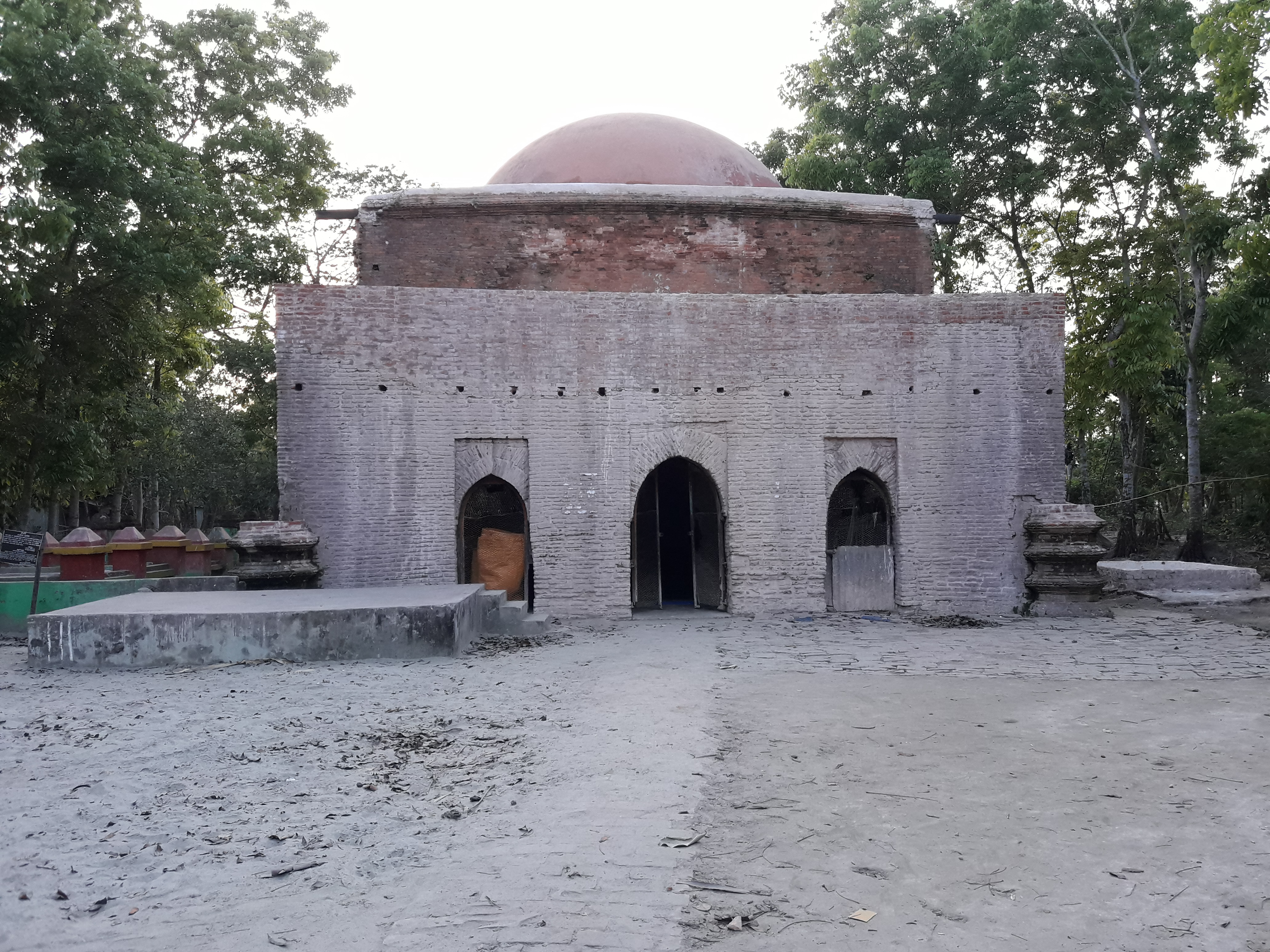
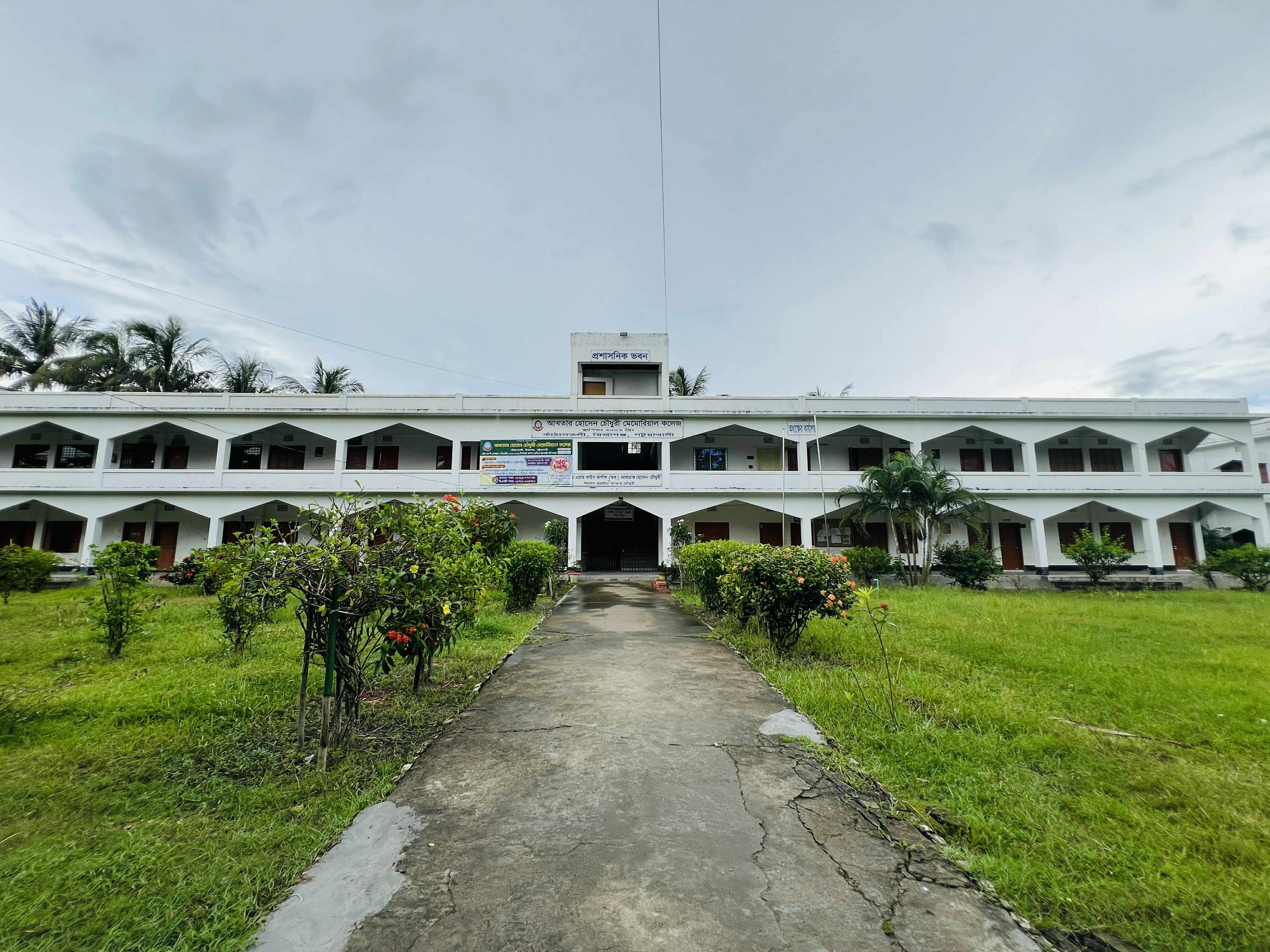
- Majidbaria Shahi Mosque Akhtar Hossain Choudhury College

- Coordinates: 22°21.8′N 90°14.5′E
- Country: Bangladesh
- Division: Barisal
- District: Patuakhali
- Headquarters: Mirzaganj

Government
  - Upazila Chairman: Khan Mohammad Abu Bakar Siddique

Area
  - Total: 167.18 km^{2} (64.55 sq mi)

Population (2022)
  - Total: 127,111
  - Density: 631/km^{2} (1,630/sq mi)
- Time zone: UTC+6 (BST)
- Postal code: 8610
- Area code: 04426
- Website: Official Map of the Mirzaganj Upazila

Mirzaganj Upazila mauza geocode map

Mirzaganj (Bengali: মির্জাগঞ্জ) is an upazila of Patuakhali District in the Division of Barisal, Bangladesh.

== History ==
At the initial stage of the War of Liberation in 1971 a large number of youths were given military training in the training centre at village Deuli of this upazila. In an encounter between the Pakistani army and the local freedom fighters on the outskirts of Mirzaganj, 32 freedom fighters lost their lives causing heavy casualties to the enemy.

== Geography ==
Mirzaganj is located at 22.3625°N 90.2417°E. It has 28,205 households and a total area of 167.18 km^{2}.

== Demographics ==
Religions in Mirzaganj Upazila (2022)
Religion	Percent
Islam	92.78%
Hinduism	7.21%

According to the 2022 Bangladeshi census, Mirzaganj Upazila had 33,012 households and a population of 127,111. 8.78% of the population were under 5 years of age. Mirzaganj had a literacy rate (age 7 and over) of 79.55%: 82.18% for males and 77.19% for females, and a sex ratio of 91.17 males for every 100 females. 26,139 (20.56%) lived in urban areas.

According to the 2011 Census of Bangladesh, Mirzaganj Upazila had 28,205 households and a population of 121,716. 26,017 (21.38%) were under 10 years of age. Mirzaganj has a literacy rate (age 7 and over) of 59.39%, compared to the national average of 51.8%, and a sex ratio of 1053 females per 1000 males. 22,406 (18.41%) lived in urban areas.

According to the 2001 Bangladesh census, Mirzaganj had a population of 118,054. Males constituted 50.06% of the population, and females 49.94%. The population aged 18 or over was 56,446. Average literacy rate is 42.1%; male 48.6%, female 35.6%.

== Economy ==
Rudimentary Farming

=== Main crops ===
Paddy, sweet potato, lentil, chilli, sesame, linseed, ground nut etc.

=== Extinct and nearly extinct crops ===
Tobacco, jute and sugarcane.

=== Main fruits ===
Mango, jackfruit, banana, futi, watermelon.

=== Main exports ===
Banana, lentil, chili, rice.

== Administration ==
Mirzaganj thana was established in 1812 and was turned into an upazila in 1983.

Mirzaganj Upazila is divided into Mirzaganj Municipality and six union parishads: Amragachia, Deuli Subidkhali, Kakrabunia, Madhabkhali, Majidbaria, and Mirzaganj. The union parishads are subdivided into 68 mauzas and 73 villages.

== Education ==
There are five colleges in the upazila. They include Howlader Foundation Women's College, founded in 2015, Akhtar Hossain Choudhury Memorial Degree College, founded in 2002, Kismotpur Delowar Hossain Degree College, Mojidbaria Degree Sollege, Subidkhali Degree College (1972), and Subidkhali Mahila College (2000).

== Tourist attraction ==
- Majidbaria Shahi Mosque
- Miabari Mosque

== Notable people ==
- Md Jahangir Alam (secretary)
- Altaf Hossain Chowdhury
- Najneen Nahar Rashid
- Altaf Haider
