= Rangpur =

Rangpur may refer to:

== Places ==
=== Bangladesh ===
- Rangpur Division
  - Rangpur District, in Rangpur Division
    - Rangpur Sadar Upazila, in Rangpur District
      - Rangpur, Bangladesh, a city and headquarter of eponymous Upazila, District and Division
- Rangpur Union, a union in Khulna District

=== India ===
- Rangpur, Assam, a capital city of the historic Ahom kingdom in present-day Assam
- Rangpur, Gujarat, a historic site

=== Pakistan ===
- Rangpur, Punjab, a town in Khushab District

== Educational Institutions ==
- Rangpur Medical College, a medical school in Bangladesh
- Rangpur Army Medical College, a medical school in Bangladesh
- Rangpur Zilla School, a high school in Bangladesh
- Rangpur Cadet College, a cadet college in Bangladesh
- Rangpur Polytechnic Institute, a technical school in Bangladesh
- Rangpur Textile Engineering College, a engineering college in Bangladesh
- Rangpur Government College, a government college in Bangladesh
- Rangpur Public School and College, a high school and college in Bangladesh

=== Others ===
- Rangpur City Corporation, governing authority of Rangpur city
- Rangpur Development Authority, development authority of Rangpur city
- Rangpur Cantonment, a Cantonment in Bangladesh
- Rangpur Riders, a team in Bangladesh Premier League
- Rangpur Cricket Garden, a cricket ground in Bangladesh
- Rangpur Riders Cricket Arena, a cricket Stadium in Bangladesh
- Rangpur Division cricket team, a cricket team in Bangladesh
- Rangpur United, a football club in Bangladesh
- Rangpur railway station, a railway station in Bangladesh
- Rangpur Express, an intercity train in Bangladesh
- Rangpur Zoo, a zoo in Bangladesh
- Rangpur Town Hall, a city hall in Bangladesh
- Rangpur lime, a fruit

== Other uses ==
- Rangpur lime, a type of citrus fruit

== See also ==
- Rangapur (disambiguation)
- Ranpur (disambiguation)
- Rajbanshi (disambiguation)
- Rangpuri language, Indo-Aryan language spoken in India, Bangladesh, and Nepal
