= List of massacre sites in Rangpur district =

Rangpur District Killing Grounds
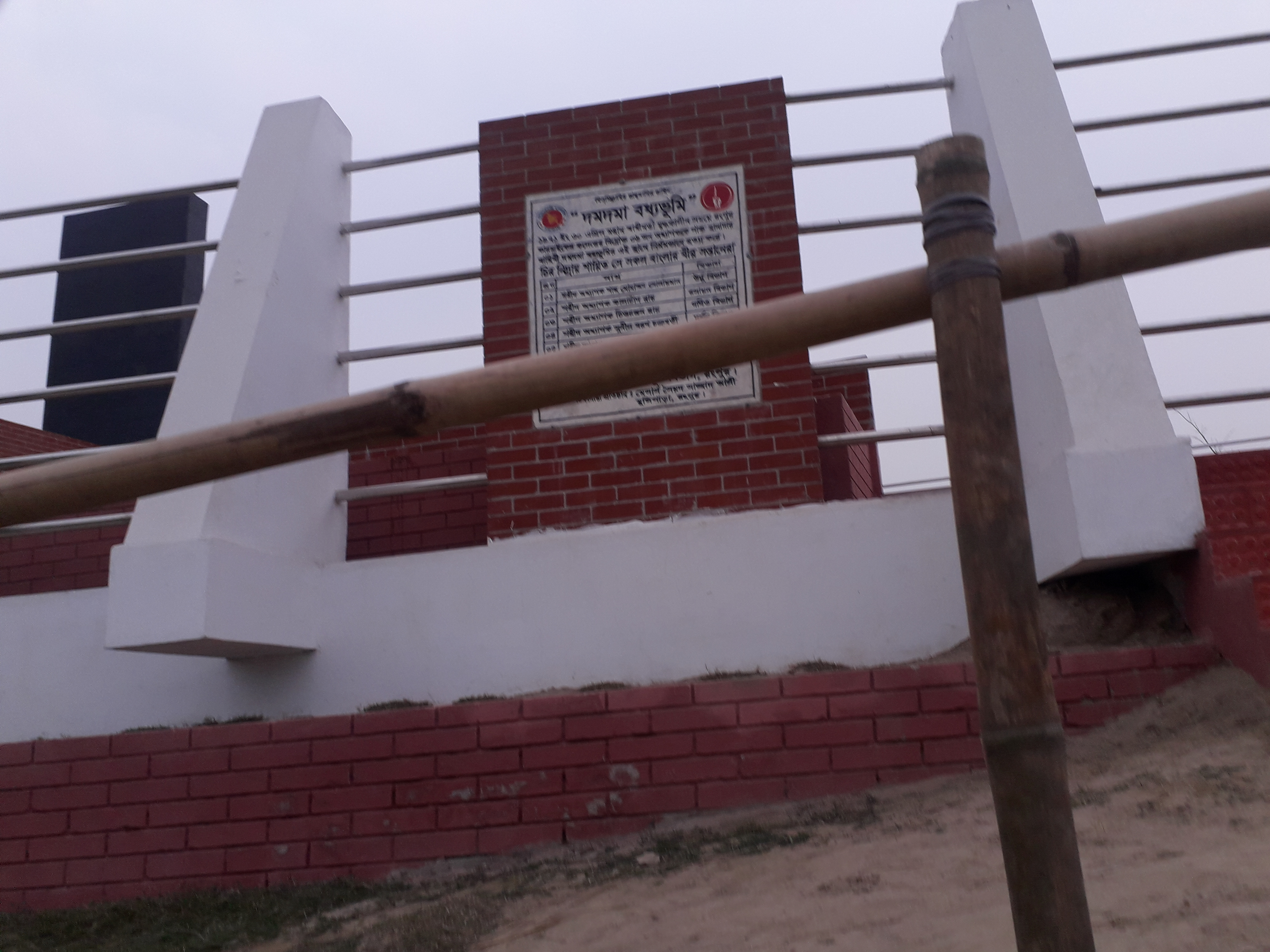
- Northern part of Damdama Killing Ground

General information
- Location: Rangpur Division, Rangpur District, Bangladesh

Technical details
- Material: Brick, Cement, Rod, Sand

Killing Grounds of Rangpur District are the locations in Bangladesh's northwestern Rangpur Division where during the Bangladesh Liberation War in 1971, the Pakistani military tortured and executed many civilians across the district. According to Banglapedia, there are ten mass grave sites in Rangpur District.

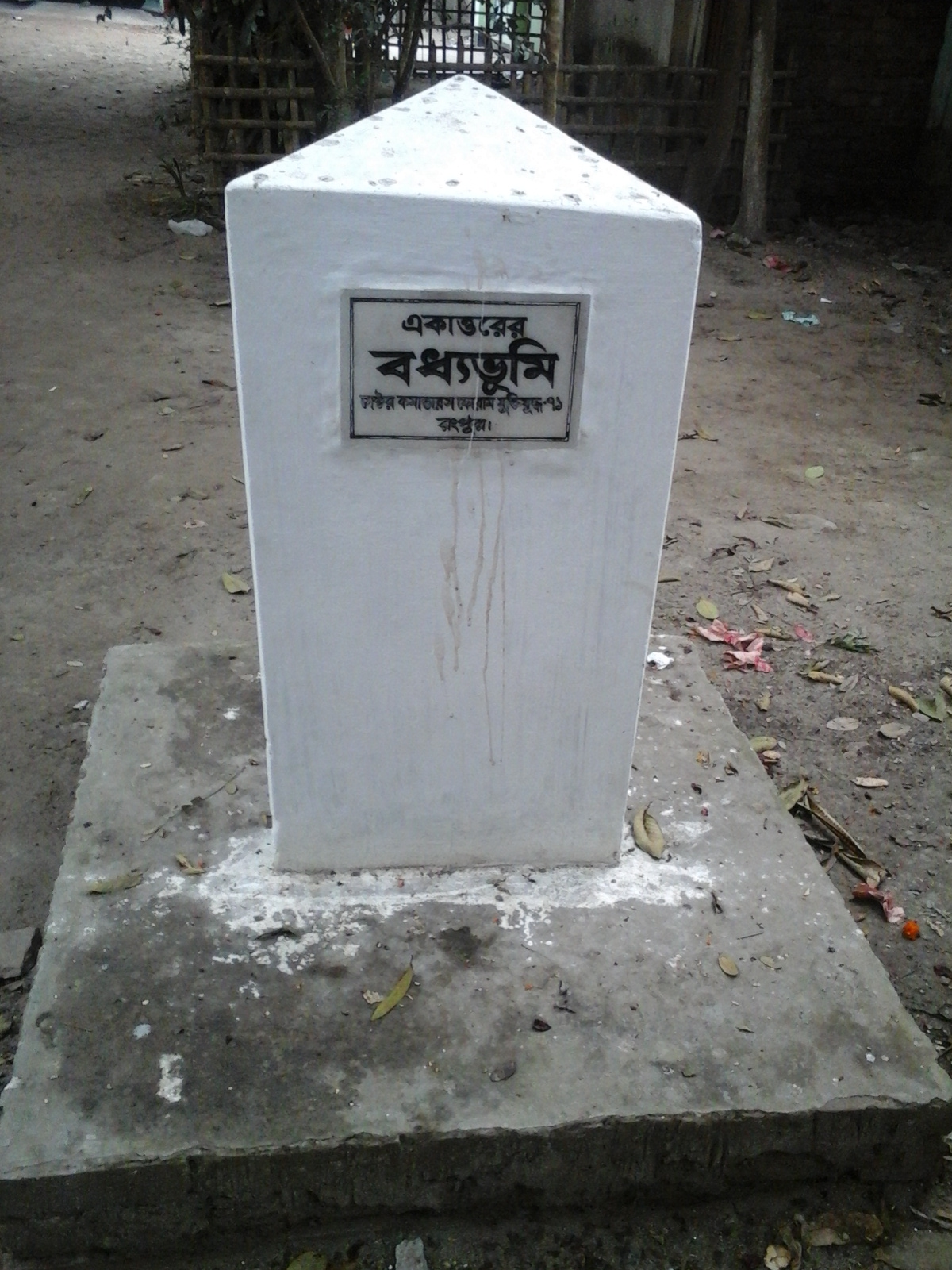
Killing Ground of 1971 - Memorial of the Massacre at Town Hall in 1971

== Carmichael College ==
On 30 April, Pakistan Army attacked Carmichael College. The Army killed Professor Chitta Ranjan Roy, Professor Boam Krishna Adhikari, Professor Kalachand Roy, Professor Md. Abdur Rahman, Professor Shah Solaiman Ali, and Professor Sunil Chandra Chakravorty. They buried the professors in a mass grave near Damdam Bridge.

== Balarakhail Killing Ground ==
Situated southwest of Rangpur Cantonment in Balarakhail where three truckloads of Bengalis were executed on 12 April 1971. Among the victims were Dr. Zikral Hossain, Dr. Yakub Ali, Dr. Shamsul Hossain, Dr. Badiuzzaman, Abed Ali, Tulshi Ram Agarwal, Jamuna Prasad, and Harihar Prasad.

== Dakhiganj Killing Ground ==
Dakhiganj Killing Ground is located beside a crematorium near the Tula Development Board on Rangpur-Mahiganj Road. On 3 April 1971, 11 people from Rangpur city were detained by Pakistan Army, tortured in Rangpur Cantonment, and then taken to Dakhiganj Shwashan Baddhyabhumi and shot dead. The others killed include Mohammad Mohoram, Sri Gopal Chandra, Durgadash Adhikari, Uttam Kumar Adhikari, Dulal Mia, Rafique Ali, Kshitish Howlader, and two other unidentified individuals. Dr. Dinesh Chandra Bhowmick, an Awami League leader, was shot eight times but survived.

== Jayram Anwar Mauza Killing Ground ==
In this mauza of the Payaraband Union, 26 people were brought and executed in five trucks. There are two killing grounds here.

== Jharuar Beel (Badarganj) and Padmapukur Killing Ground ==
Located in Ramnath Union of Badarganj Upazila. Around 400 Bengalis were executed here.

== Nabdiganj Killing Ground ==
Located in Nabdiganj village on Rangpur-Kawnia Road, 11 people were executed here. A memorial killing ground exists here.

== Sahebganj Killing Ground ==
Located 5 km away from Rangpur city, in the Tapodhan Union's Bircharan Mauza. Here, the bodies of 19 Bengali soldiers were buried, and their names remain unknown.

== Taltala Mosque ==
Following a battle between Mujib Bahini and Pakistan Army, in which two soldiers and five Razzakars died, the Army killed 17 people inside the Taltala Mosque in retaliation.

== Teesta Bridge ==
The Pakistan Army killed about 200 people after attacking villages on both side of the Teesta River on 30 June. This was in retaliation after villages killed two soldiers who were trying to rape a local woman.

== Town Hall Killing Ground ==
The Rangpur Town Hall in Rangpur City was built in 1913 by the British Colonial government and later became a center of cultural life in Rangpur. During the Bangladesh Liberation War, the Pakistan Army established a military base at the town hall. People detained by the army were kept here and tortured. Several unidentified human skeletons were found in the well on the northern side of the Town Hall where the bodies from the town hall were dumped. Mansura Begum, wife of Mukti Bahini personnel Mostafa Mia, was brought to the town hall where she was tortured and raped repeatedly by soldiers. She had seen other women who were held and raped at the town hall. A memorial monument for the killing ground is located here.
