= Rangapur =

Rangapur may refer to:

- Rangapur, Kapilvastu, a village in Kapilvastu district in Lumbini, Nepal
- Rangapur, Rautahat, a village in Rautahat district in Narayani, Nepal
- Rangapur, Belgaum, a village in Belgaum district of Karnataka, India
- Rangapur, Nalgonda district, a village in Nalgonda district of Telangana, India
- Rangapur, Manchal mandal, a village in Ranga Reddy district of Telangana, India
- Rangapur, Shabad mandal, a village in Ranga Reddy district of Andhra Pradesh, India

== See also ==
- Rangpur (disambiguation)
