= Rangpur Polytechnic Institute =

Technical educational institution

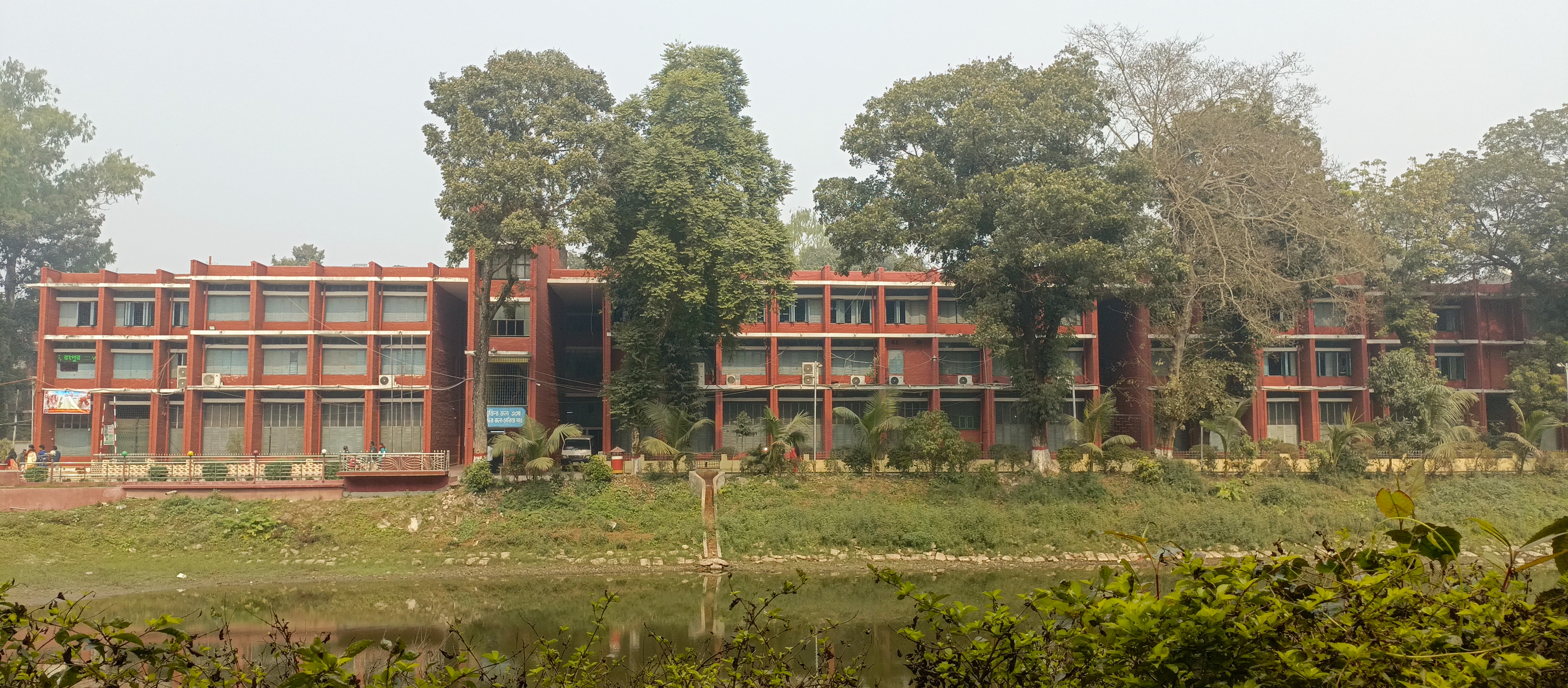
- Rangpur Polytechnic Institute
- Former names: Bailey Bridge Govind Lal Technical School (1882-1962); Rangpur Technical Institute (1962-68)
- Type: Public
- Established: 1882; 144 years ago
- Location: Rangpur, 5400, Bangladesh
- Campus: Urban 32.9 acres (13.3 ha)
- Website: rangpur.polytech.gov.bd
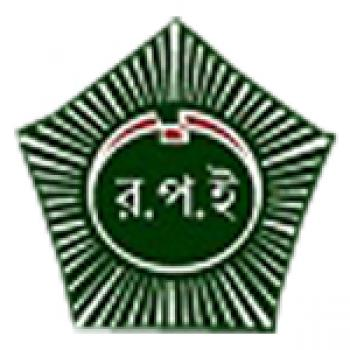

Rangpur Polytechnic Institute is a technical educational institution in Rangpur, Bangladesh. It was established in 1882 as Bailey Bridge Govind Lal Technical School.

== History ==
In 1882, with the goal of developing skilled human resources in technical education, an institution named "Bailey Bridge Govinda Lal Technical School" was established. In 1962, under the "7-Step Program" adopted by the Ayub Khan government, "Rangpur Technical Institute" was established with civil and power technology. In 1968, mechanical and electrical technology were added, and the institution was renamed "Rangpur Polytechnic Institute". Subsequently, the institute expanded further by including electronics technology in 1992, computer technology in 2002, and electromedical technology in 2006.

== Departments ==
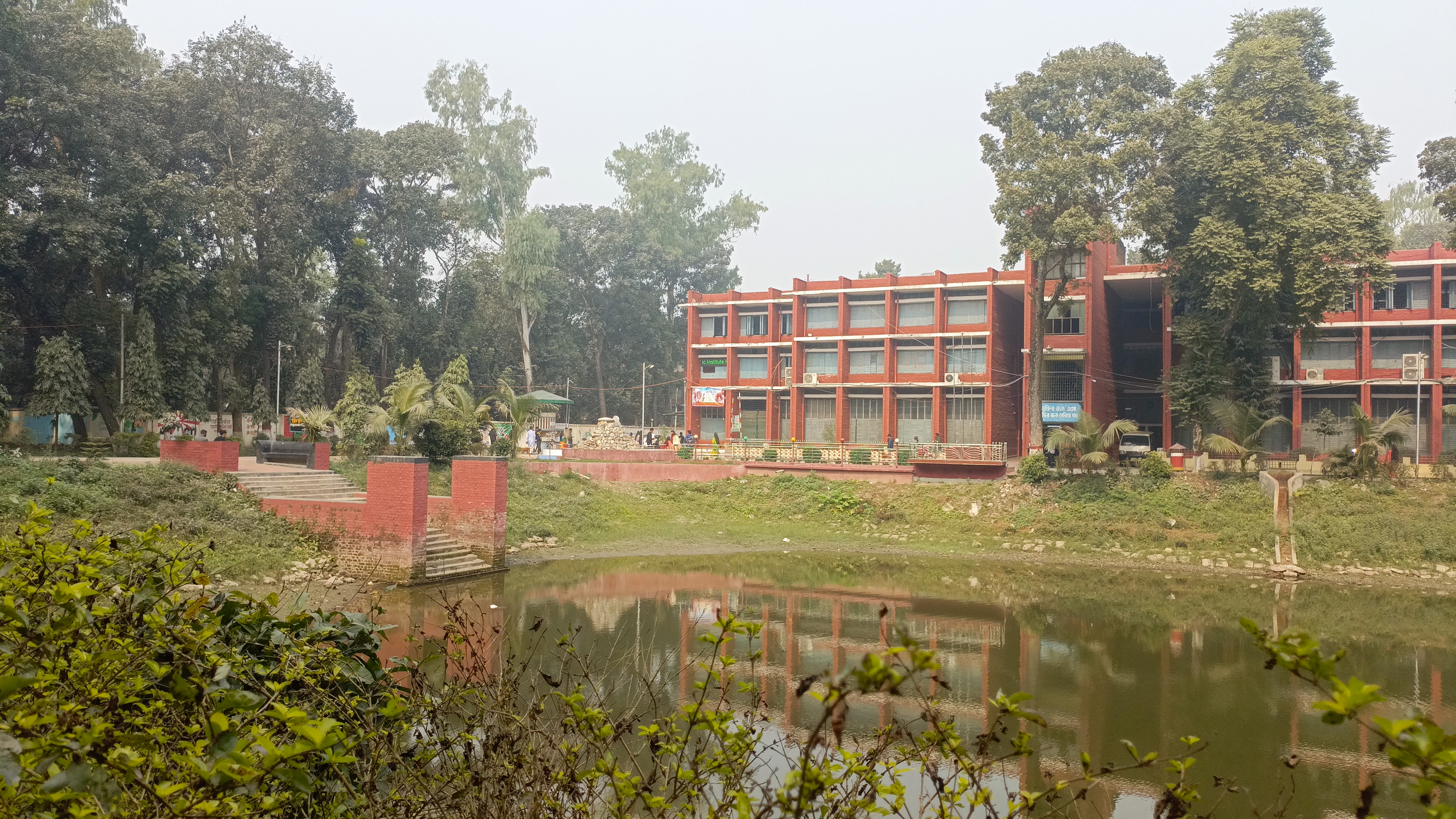
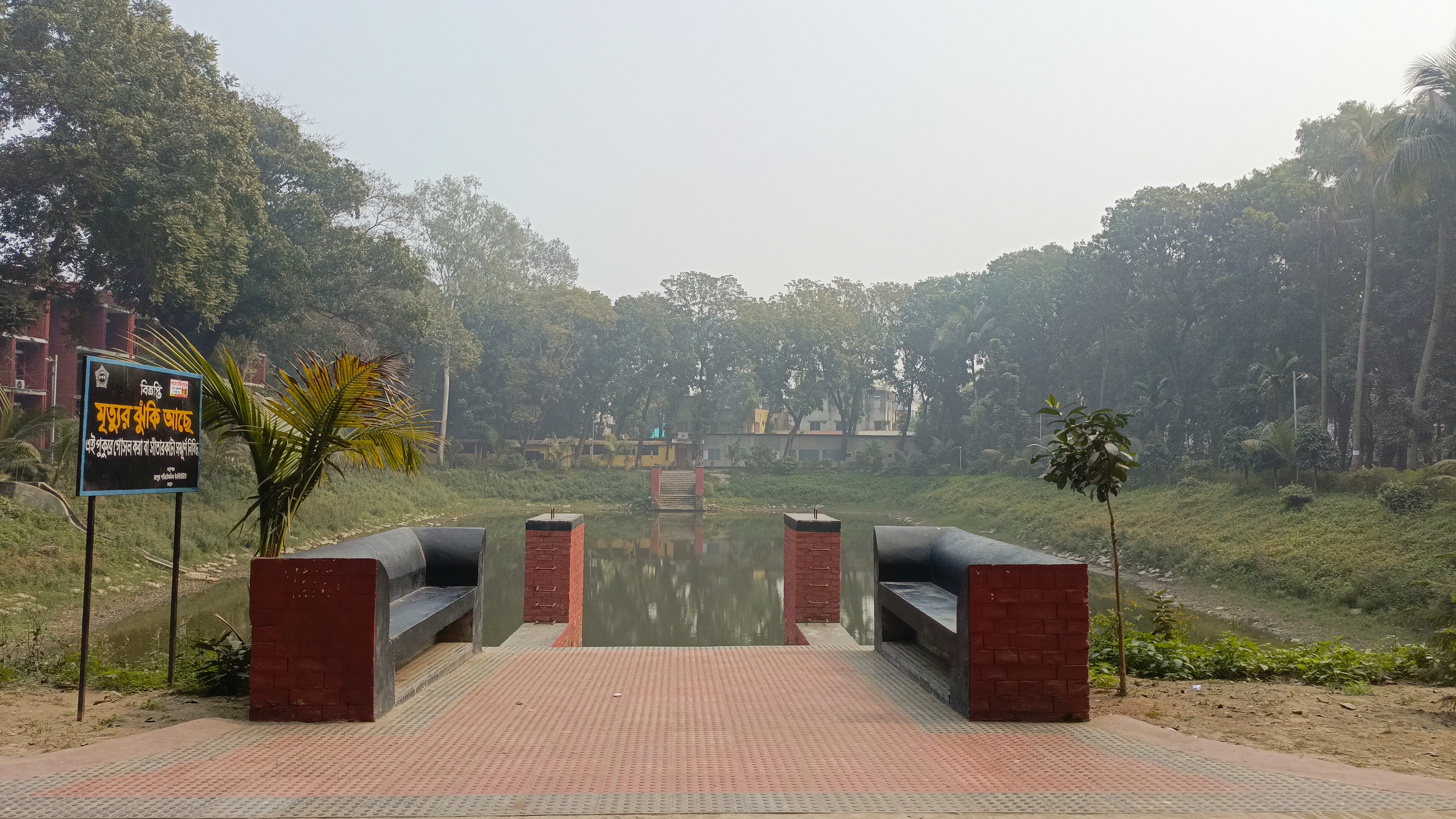
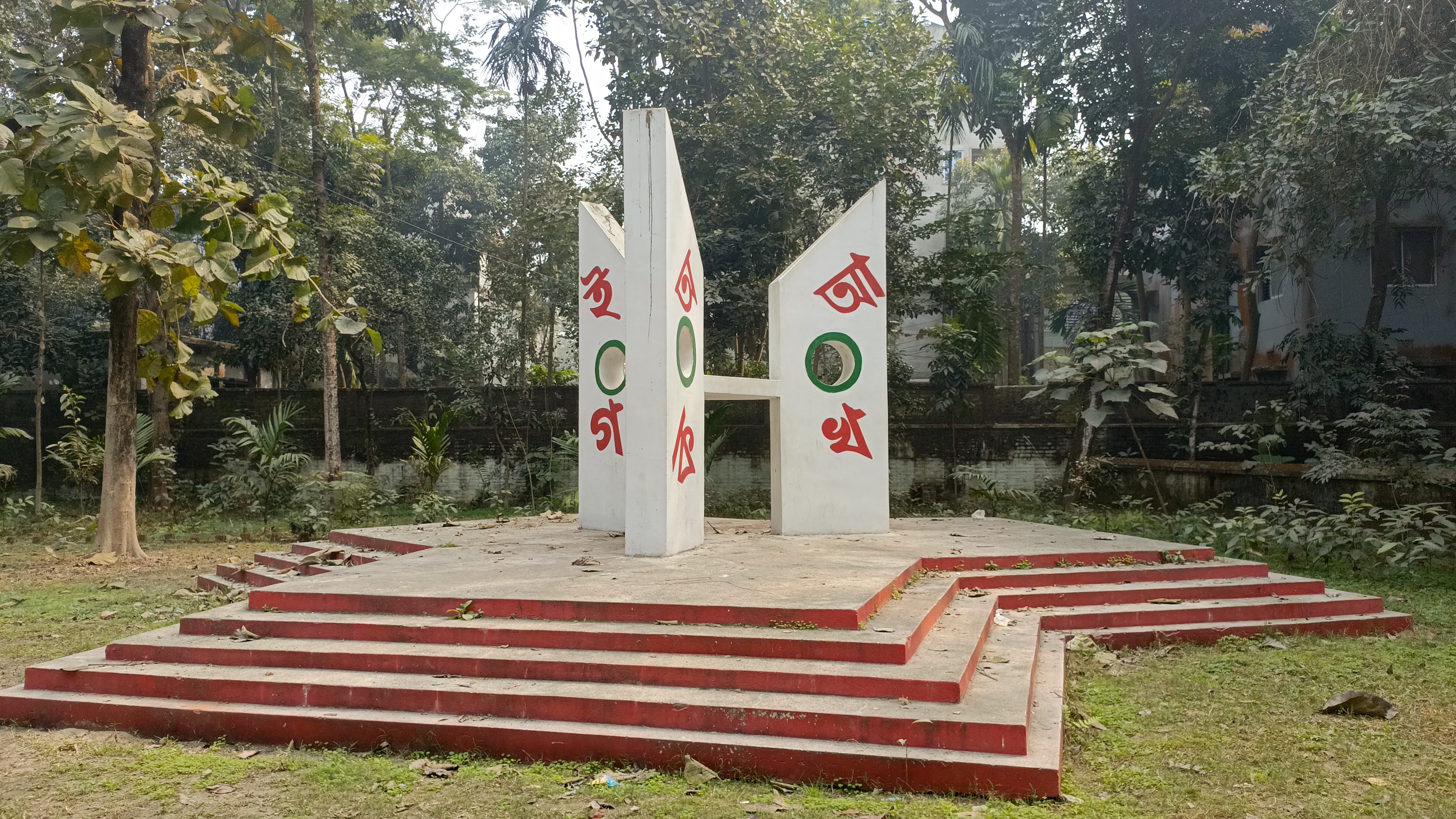
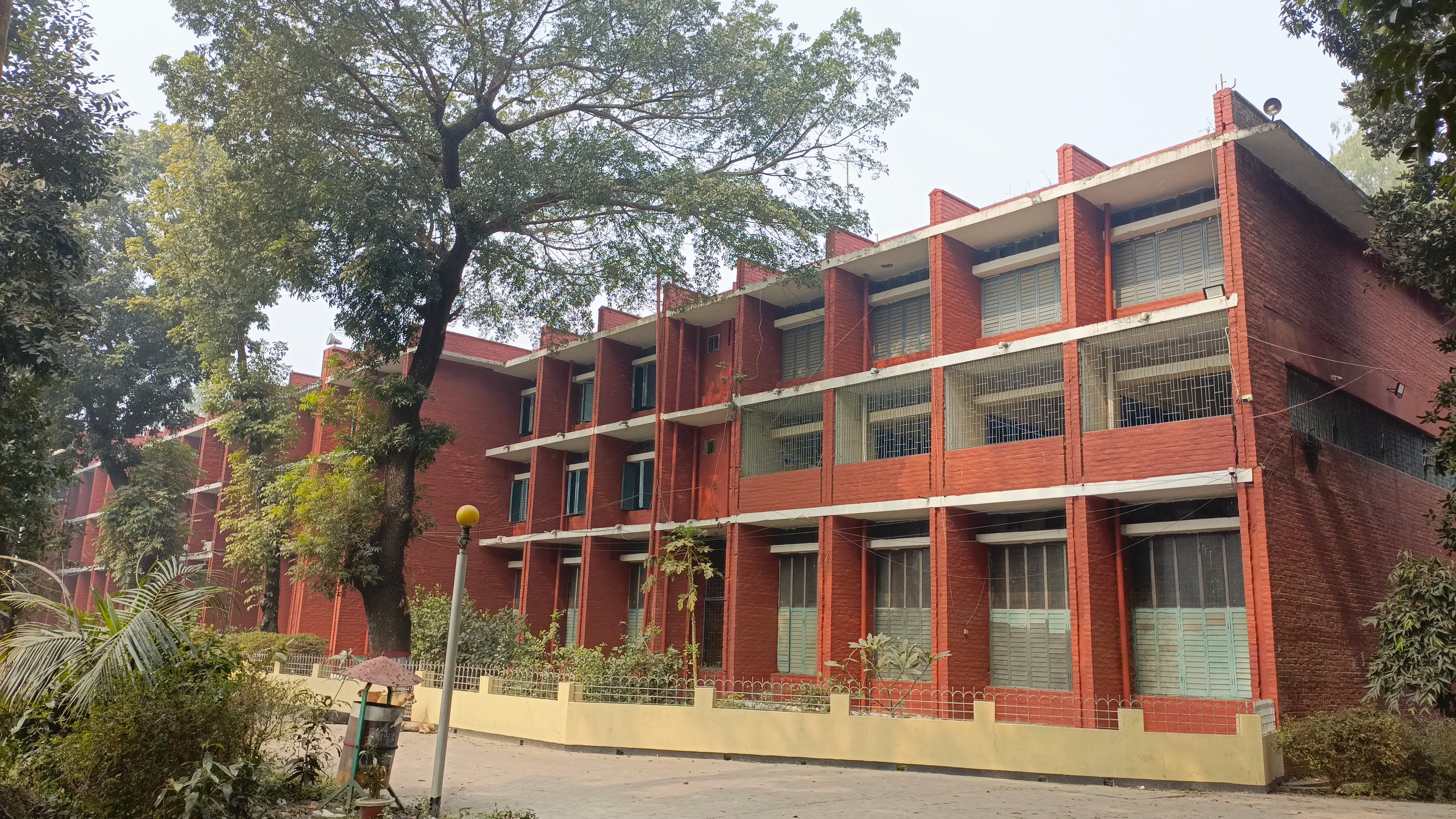
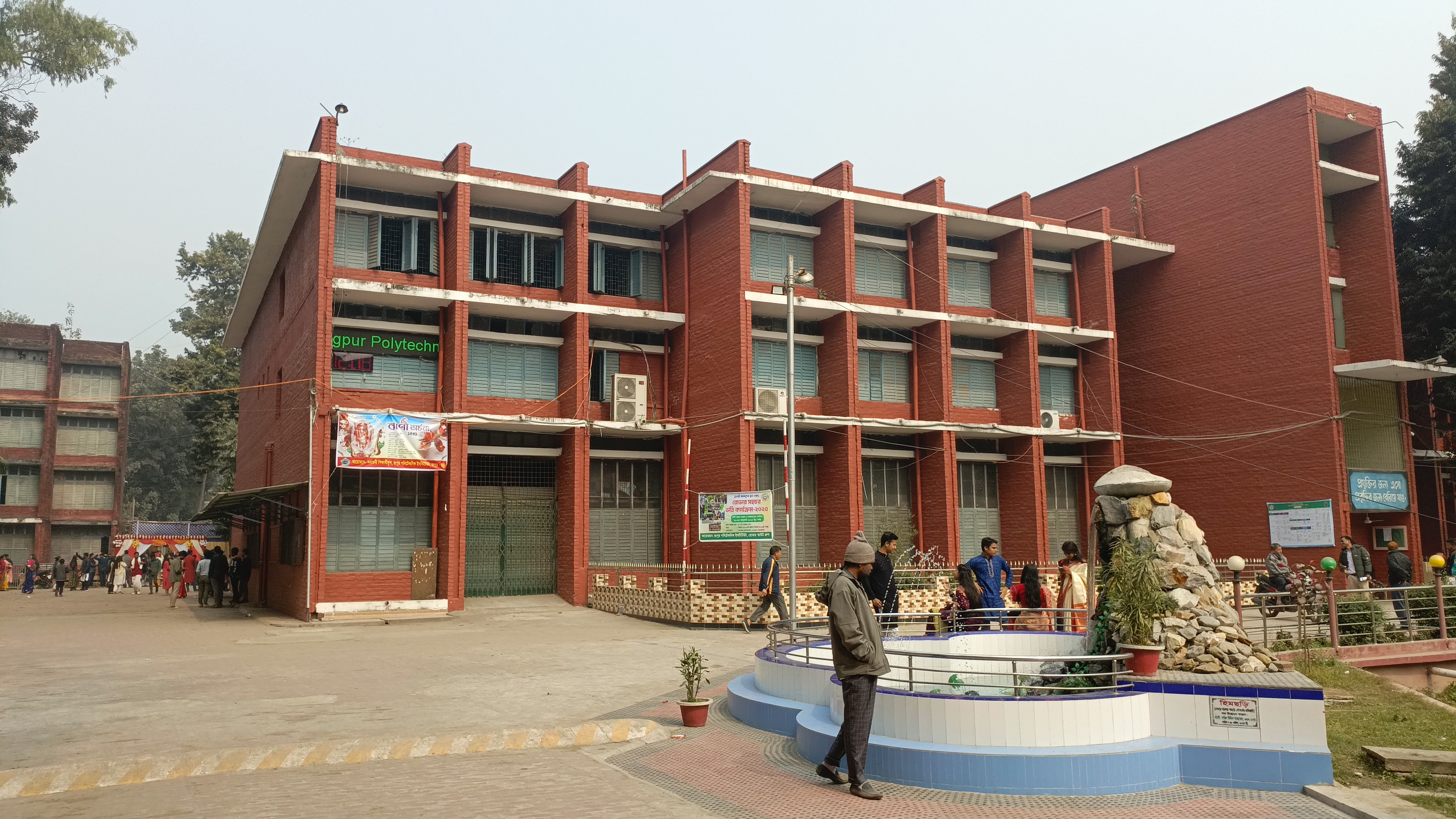
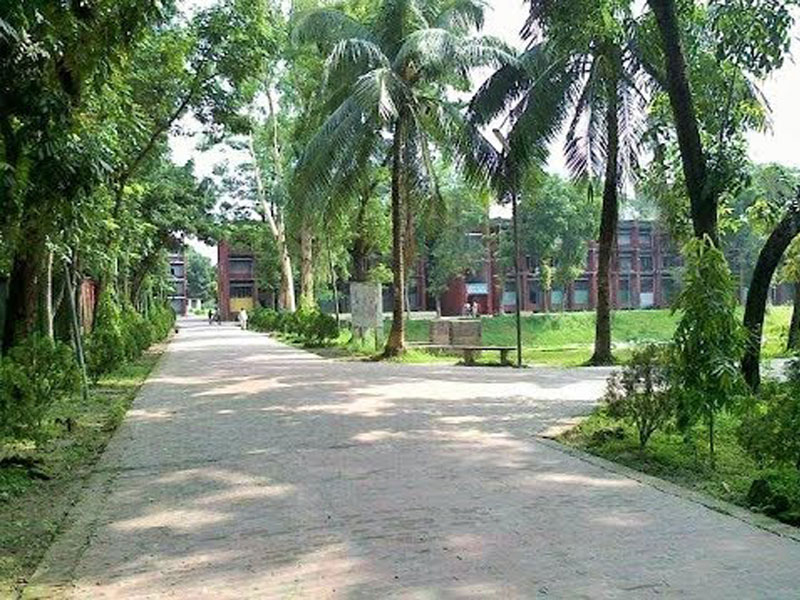

Rangpur Polytechnic Institute offers a Diploma in Engineering under seven departments:

- Civil Technology
- Computer Science and Technology
- Electrical Technology
- Electromedical Technology
- Electronics Technology
- Mechanical Technology
- Power Technology

== See also ==
- Bangladesh Technical Education Board
- Bogra Polytechnic Institute
- Chandpur Polytechnic Institute
- Chittagong Polytechnic Institute
- Dhaka Polytechnic Institute
- Faridpur Polytechnic Institute
- Jessore Polytechnic Institute
- Khulna Polytechnic Institute
