= Ranipur =

Ranipur may refer to:

- Ranipur, Bangladesh, a village
- Ranipur, Sindh, a town in Pakistan
- Ranipur, Uttar Pradesh, a town in Jhansi district, Uttar Pradesh, India
- Ranipur-Jharial, an archaeological site in Odisha, India
- Ranipur, Uttarakhand, a town in Uttarakhand, India
- Mauranipur, a town in Jhansi district, Uttar Pradesh, India
- Ranipur Sanctuary, a wildlife sanctuary in Banda District, Uttar Pradesh, India
- Ranipur, Bihar, a village in Bihar, India
- Tawa Nagar in Madhya Pradesh, India; also known as Ranipur

== See also ==
- Ranapur
- Ranpur (disambiguation)
