= Ranpur =

Ranpur may refer to the following places in India:

- Ranpur, Gujarat, a town in Gujarat
- Ranpur Taluka, a taluka in Botad district of Gujarat
- Ranpur, Abdasa, a village in Abdasa Taluka, Kutch District, Gujarat
- Raj-Ranpur, Odisha, also known as "Ranpur", a town in Odisha
  - Ranpur (Odisha Vidhan Sabha constituency)
- Ranpur State, a former princely state of Odisha
- Porbandar State, also known as Ranpur, a former princely state of Gujarat

== See also ==
- Ranapur, a town in Madhya Pradesh
- Ranipur (disambiguation)
- Rangpur (disambiguation)
- Rampur (disambiguation)
