= Mistry Para Rangpur =

Coordinates: 25.7477°N 89.2366°E

Shatgara Mistry Para (সাতগাড়া মিস্ত্রিপাড়া) is a neighborhood of Rangpur city, Bangladesh located near 25.7482N, 89.23974E.

== Geography ==
This neighborhood is surrounded by Gurati Para and part of Munshi Para to the east, Kerani Para to the west, Munshipara to the south and Guratipara to the north. The soil composition is mainly alluvial soil, similar to other areas of Rangpur. The temperature ranges from 32 to 11 °C, and the annual rainfall averages 2931 mm.

== Political geography ==
this neighborhood is under

- Ward No: 20 (Rangpur City Corporation)
- Union: Rangpur City Corporation (Previously Rangpur Sadar)
- District: Rangpur
- Division: Rangpur
- Post Code: 5400
- Telephone code: 0521
- Population: Approximately 2,000.

== Description ==
Shatgara Mistry Para is about 0.6 km away from the center of Rangpur city. The neighborhood is approximately 1500 meters long and 2000 meter wide and is populated by 2,000 people. There are two mosques acting as an important landmark for this place. With Several farmlands and buildings this area is treated as a resident area instead of an industrial area.
