= Rajbanshi =

Rajbanshi or Rajbongshi may refer to:

- Rajbanshi people, an ethnic group of India, Bangladesh, and Nepal
  - Rangpuri language or Rajbanshi language, their Indo-Aryan language
    - Rajbanshi language (Nepal), an Indo-Aryan language of Nepal, closely related to the above

== See also ==
- Rangpur (disambiguation)
- Rajvanshi Devi (1886–1962), first First Lady of India
- Priya Rajvanshi or Priya Rajvansh (1936–2000), Indian film actress
