= Rangpur Public School and College =

- রংপুর পাবলিক স্কুল অ্যান্ড কলেজ

Location
- ৩ নং চেক পোস্ট, ক্যান্টনমেন্ট রোড, উপশহর, রংপুর ঘাগট সোনা পার্ক থেকে ২০০ গজ উত্তরে ফোন নম্বর: ০১৯৫৬-২৮৩৭৭৬, ০১৭১৯-২০৭৯১৬; 5400; Bangladesh; 25.7149°N 89.2474°E

Information
- Motto: Quality Education through developed management
- Established: 2010
- School board: Board of Intermediate and Secondary Education, Dinajpur
- School code: 136959
- Principal: Amol Chandra Roy (Acting)
- Website: rpsacbd.com

Rangpur Public School and College is a school and college in Rangpur, Bangladesh. It was founded in 2010. It started functioning in 2010 from nursery to class V. Year passed it extended up to class XI-XII. All courses of this school and college have been affiliated with the Board of Intermediate and Secondary Education, Dinajpur.

== Location ==
Darshana More, Rangpur.
