= Chandpur Polytechnic Institute =

College in Bangladesh

Coordinates: 23.338303°N 90.897761°E

- Other names: CPI
- Type: Government
- Established: 2005
- Academic affiliations: Bangladesh Technical Education Board
- Principal: Anwarul Kabir
- Students: 1500+
- Location: Kachua, Chandpur, Bangladesh
- Campus: Urban, 4 acres (1.6 ha)
- Website: chandpur.polytech.gov.bd

Chandpur Polytechnic Institute (Bengali: চাঁদপুর পলিটেকনিক ইন্সটিটিউট) or CPI is a government polytechnic institute in Chandpur, Bangladesh. The institute is located at the city area Kachua, 50 km (31 mi) from the Chandpur City.

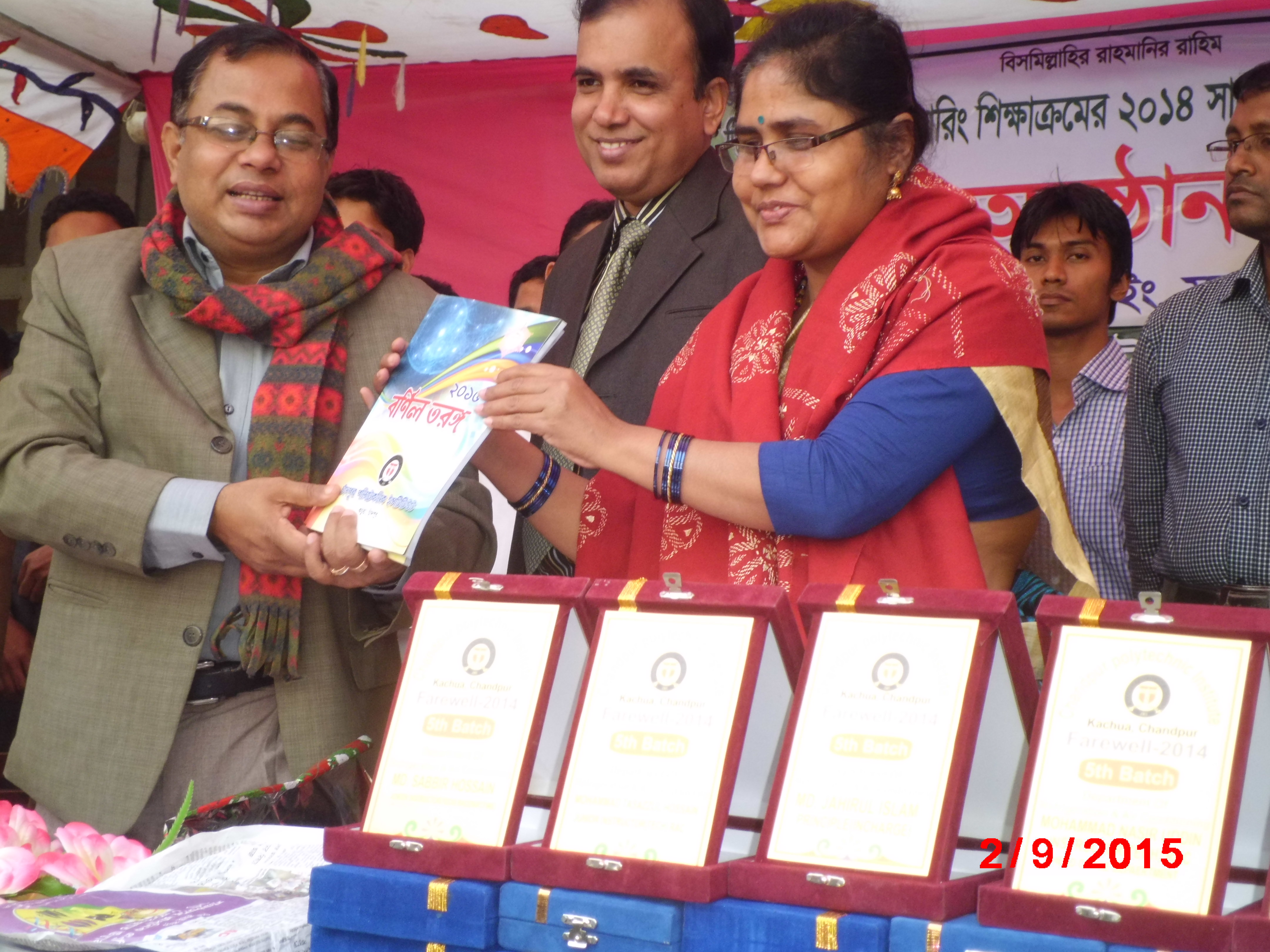
OPEN "Bornil Torongo" Magazine

== Course ==
The "Diploma-in-Engineering" degree is rated higher than the HSC certificate, and both are lesser than a formal Baccalaureate or BSc (Bachelor in Science) degree. They are the entry level diplomas for enrolling into any B.Sc. in engineering degrees. Students which complete the Diploma-in-Engineering (4 year-long curriculum) courses acquire an educational level equivalent to grade XIV (14th grade); students who complete the HSC level (2 year-long curriculum), acquire an educational level equivalent to grade XII (12th grade). Most of the diploma-in-engineering curricula were extended from a 3-year study period to a four-year-long study period. In the "Madrasah Education System", 14th grade is also known as 'Fazil' level.

== See also ==
- Faridpur Polytechnic Institute
- Dhaka Polytechnic Institute
