= Ranipur, Bangladesh =

- Location in Bangladesh
- Coordinates: 22°26′N 90°13′E
- Country: Bangladesh
- Division: Barisal Division
- District: Barguna District
- Time zone: UTC+6 (Bangladesh Time)

Ranipur, Bangladesh is a village in Barguna District in the Barisal Division of southern-central Bangladesh.

== See also ==
- List of villages in Bangladesh
