= Ranpur, Abdasa =

Ranpur રાણપુર
- Village
- Location within Gujarat Location within India
- Coordinates: 23°08′35″N 68°44′43″E
- Country: India
- State: Gujarat
- District: Kutch
- Time zone: UTC+5:30 (IST)
- Vehicle registration: GJ-12

Ranpur (Gujarati: રાણપુર) is a village in Abdasa Taluka of Kutch District in the Indian state of Gujarat. The main occupations of its residents are agriculture, farm labor and animal husbandry. The village's main farm products are Mung bean, Sesame, Panicum, Sorghum and Alfalfa, and some other vegetable crops are cultivated here as well. The village also have facilities such as a primary school, a gram panchayat (village council), a kindergarten, and a milk dairy.
