= Faridpur Polytechnic Institute =

Government polytechnic institute of Bangladesh

- ফরিদপুর পলিটেকনিক ইনস্টিটিউট
- Other names: FPI
- Type: Public Technical Academic Institute, Polytechnic Institute, Coeducational
- Established: 1963; 63 years ago
- Principal: Akkas Ali Sheikh
- Academic staff: 62
- Students: 3824
- Location: Baitul Aman, Faridpur, Bangladesh; 23°35′43″N 89°51′44″E
- Website: polytechnic.faridpur.gov.bd

Faridpur Polytechnic Institute (Bengali: ফরিদপুর পলিটেকনিক ইন্সটিটিউট), often abbreviated as FPI, is a government technical institute in Faridpur, Bangladesh. It is one of the oldest polytechnic institutes in Bangladesh.

== History ==
The institute was established in 1963 as Faridpur Technical Institute. In 1967, it was reformed as Faridpur Polytechnic Institute.

== Location ==
Faridpur Polytechnic Institute is located at Baitul Aman, a neighborhood of Faridpur city in Bangladesh. It is near Baitul Aman campus of the Government Rajendra College, Faridpur.

== Academic programs and departments ==
It offers diploma-level programmes for Diploma-in-Engineering in many different technological areas, each required to study for a 4-year-long curriculum.

Students can participate in:

- Civil engineering
- Computer engineering
- Refrigeration and air conditioning engineering
- Electrical engineering
- Mechanical engineering
- Power engineering

There is a department for each of the above programmes and a related subject department called as Non-tech. Each department is headed by a chief instructor (CI). So, there are total of seven departments in Faridpur Polytechnic Institute.

== Students ==
As of January 2022, there are 3824 students in 6 departments in the institute.

== Academic staff ==
The principal is Engr. Md. Akkas Ali Sheikh.

Departments heads include:

- Civil Technology:

Md. Ismail Hossain (1st Shift) Md. Nurul Islam Bhuiyan (2nd Shift)

- Electrical Technology:

Moniruzzaman Raju (1st Shift) Md.Shah Sikander (2nd Shift)

- Mechanical Technology:

Prokash Kumar Saha SM Ishaque

- Power Technology:

SM Ishaque

- Computer Technology:

Md. Ripan Mian (2nd Shift) Fahim Ahmed (1st Shift)

- Refrigeration and Air Conditioning Technology: Mohammad Reaz Hossain
- Non-Tech:

Md. Jahangir Alam Md. Mujibor Rahman Bhuiyan

Currently there are about 62 teachers in the institute.

== Facilities ==
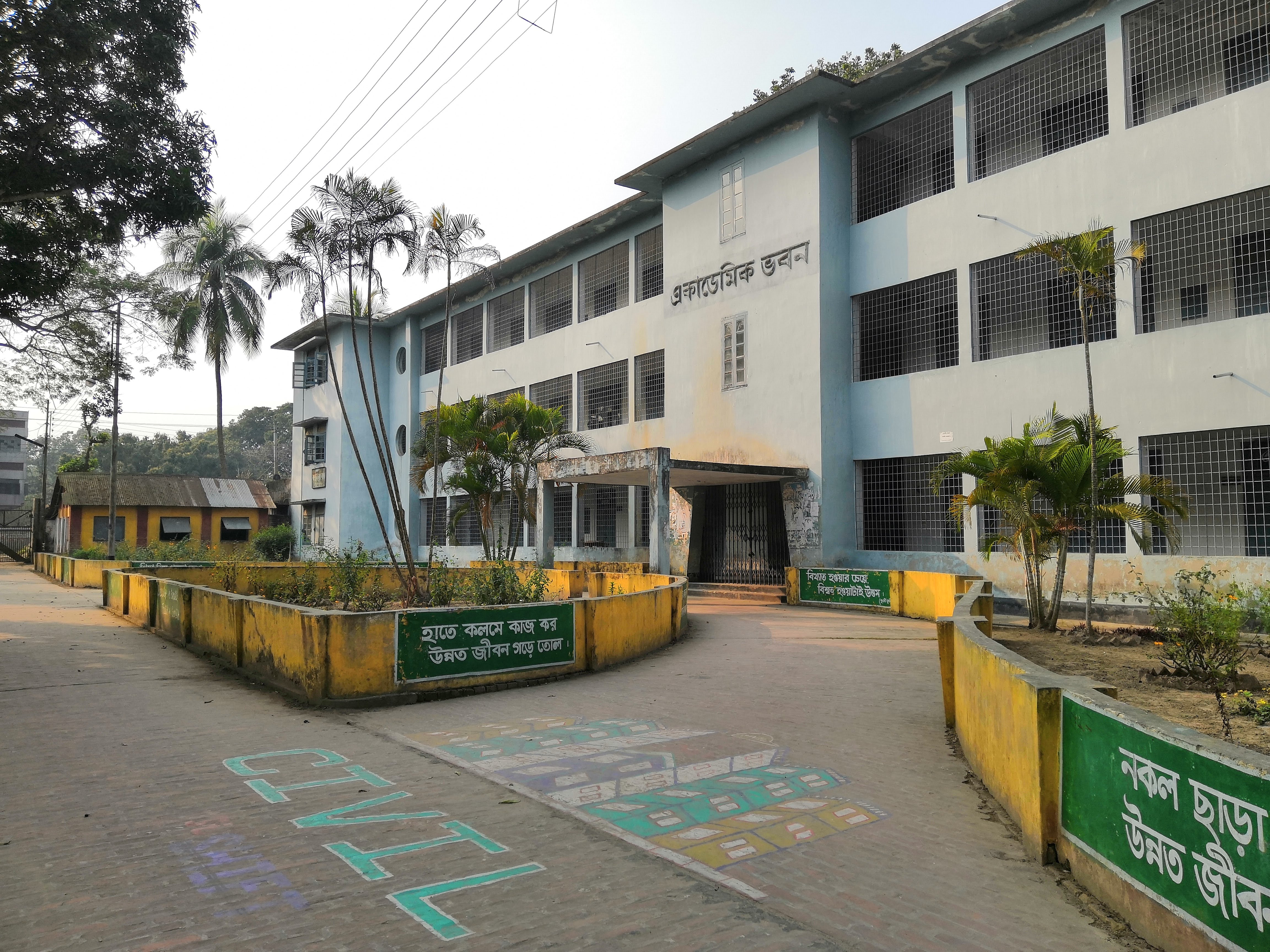
Academic building of Faridpur Polytechnic Institute

The institute has necessary facilities to keep up good educational environment. Government and institute authority are always doing their best to improve the existing facilities and adding more to it.

=== Halls of residence ===
There three dormitories for students. Two are for boys and one for girls.

- Kobi Alaul Hall
- Shahid Titumir Hall
- Women Hall

=== Workshops and laboratories ===
- Refrigeration and air condition lab
- R.A.C. Lab
- Electrical Wiring Shop
- Electrical Machine Shop
- ENT LAB
- Audio Visual LAB
- Machine Shop
- Welding Shop
- Sheet Metal Lab
- Materials Testing Lab
- Steam lab
- Wood Shop
- Mason Shop
- Software lab
- Digital lab
- Physics lab
- Chemistry lab
- Auto diesel shop
- Fuels and lubricants lab
- Hydraulics lab
- Foundry shop
- Steam and gas lab

=== Library ===
There is a library in the institute for the use of students, teachers and staff. The library is kept open during institute hours to enable the students to study. Students can borrow necessary books for a semester without any fees.

=== Mosque ===
There is an air conditioning mosque in the institute.

=== Flower garden ===
There are several local and foreign flower gardens here. Which made this institute look awesome.

=== Political views ===
That institute is a non-political institute.

== Directorates ==
The institute operates under the executive control of the Ministry of Education(MOE) acting through the Directorate of Technical Education (DTE). The academic programmes, curriculams are maintained under the regulation of the Bangladesh Technical Education Board (BTEB). BTEB function under Directorate of Inspection and Audit (DIA), which in turn function under Chief Accounts Office (CAO), and it function under MOE.

== See also ==
- Chandpur Polytechnic Institute
- Barisal Polytechnic Institute
- Dhaka Polytechnic Institute
