= Rangpur Town Hall =

Cultural Center in Rangpur, Bangladesh

Coordinates: 25.7543°N 89.2509°E

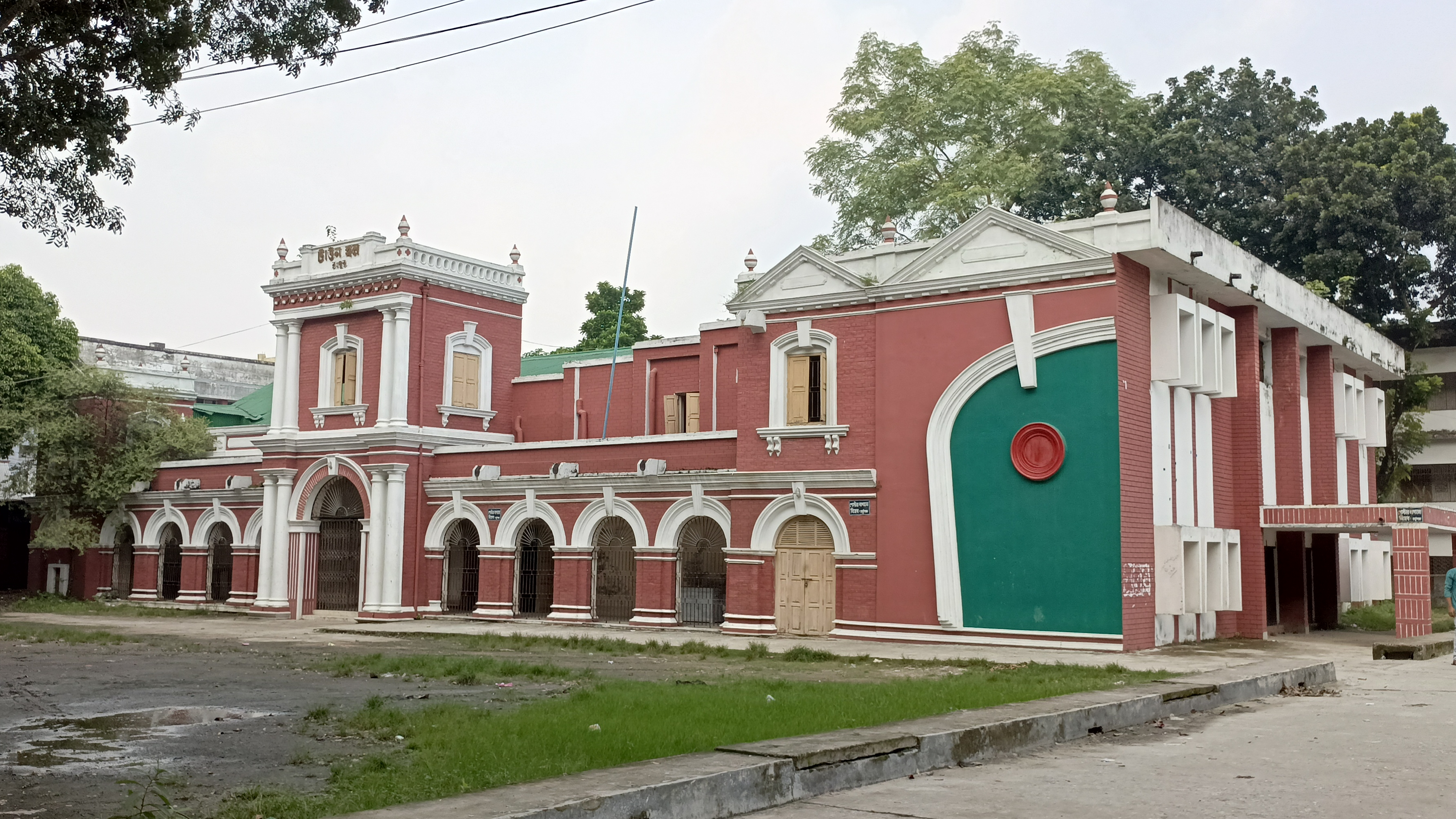
Rangpur Town Hall building

Rangpur Town Hall (Bengali: রংপুর টাউন হল) is a city hall situated at the heart of the city of Rangpur, Bangladesh. It was built in 1896 as a theater by the historical Rongopur Natya Samaj (Rangpur Dramatic Association or RDA); it is one of the oldest of its kind in Bangladesh. It is one of the best known landmarks of the city as well.

== History ==
The plan to establish a theatre in Rangpur was first propagated by the RDA in 1885. Later on, in 1891, a piece of land was donated at the heart of the city by the then landlord of Kakina, and the official initiatives were taken instantly. In 1896, the piece of land was handed over to the RDA by the Secretary of State for India. The first play organized here was the play "Sharmishtha(1859)" by Michael Madhusudan Dutt. But according to another source, the first play organized here was the "Kulinkulsworboswo"(1854) by Ramnarayan Tarkaratna. This town hall campus also has one of the oldest libraries in the entire Indian subcontinent, the Rangpur Public Library (estb. 1854). This campus also was home to the first ever branch of "Bangiya Sahitya Parishad" outside of Kolkata, the then capital of British India, named "Rangpur Shahitya Parishad".

This campus also has one of the earliest and unique "Shaheed Minars" in Bangladesh, commemorating the sacrifices of people martyred during the Language Movement on the streets of Rangpur in 1952. This town hall was used as a "concentration camp" and torture cell by the Pakistan Army against the resisting Bengali freedom fighters and innocent masses of Rangpur in 1971. Now the whole campus contains two of Rangpur's premium libraries- the Public Library and the District Library, the Shahid Minar, and the regional "Shilpakala Academy" (Arts Academy) of Rangpur. The current building was built in 1913.

The Town Hall premises, which also include the Rangpur Martyrs Memorial, have been one of the hotbeds of the anti-fascist July Revolution of 2024. The entire mass of the city, led by Gen Z, gathered in the town hall and the adjacent area in protest immediately after the martyrdom of Abu Sayed on 16 July. The protest continued until 5 August and, like in 1952, 1969, and the 1980s, the Town Hall again appeared as a hallmark of rebellion for this city with a long history of rebellions, revolutions, and movements.

== Cultural impact ==
Rangpur is called the city of joy (Rang means joy, Pur means City). Historically, Rangpur is one of the oldest cities of Bengal. The traditional inclination towards cultural prosperity helped Rangpur to grow in its own fashion, and in it, this campus played a pivotal role. Now it is the hub of Rangpur's cultural activities. On every national day or cultural day like Pahela Baishakh, cultural programmes are organized at a huge level by both government and non-government organizations. In these days, the whole campus becomes the hub of the city's celebration. This is also one of the reservoirs of regional Rangpuri language and culture and the regional Bhawaiya music of North Bengal. Here, almost every week there is at least one cultural programme or discussion organized by different cultural groups of the city. This institution is associated with some of the prominent figures of Bengali culture, including Asaduzzaman Noor, Tulsi Lahiri, and Baby Naznin. Also, it hosted Sarat Chandra Chattopadhyay, Muhammad Shahidullah, and Netaji Subhas Chandra Bose previously.
