= Rangpur, Bangladesh =

Metropolis and Capital of Rangpur Division, Bangladesh

Rangpur রংপুর (Bengali) অমপুর/অংপুর (Rangpuri)
- Metropolis
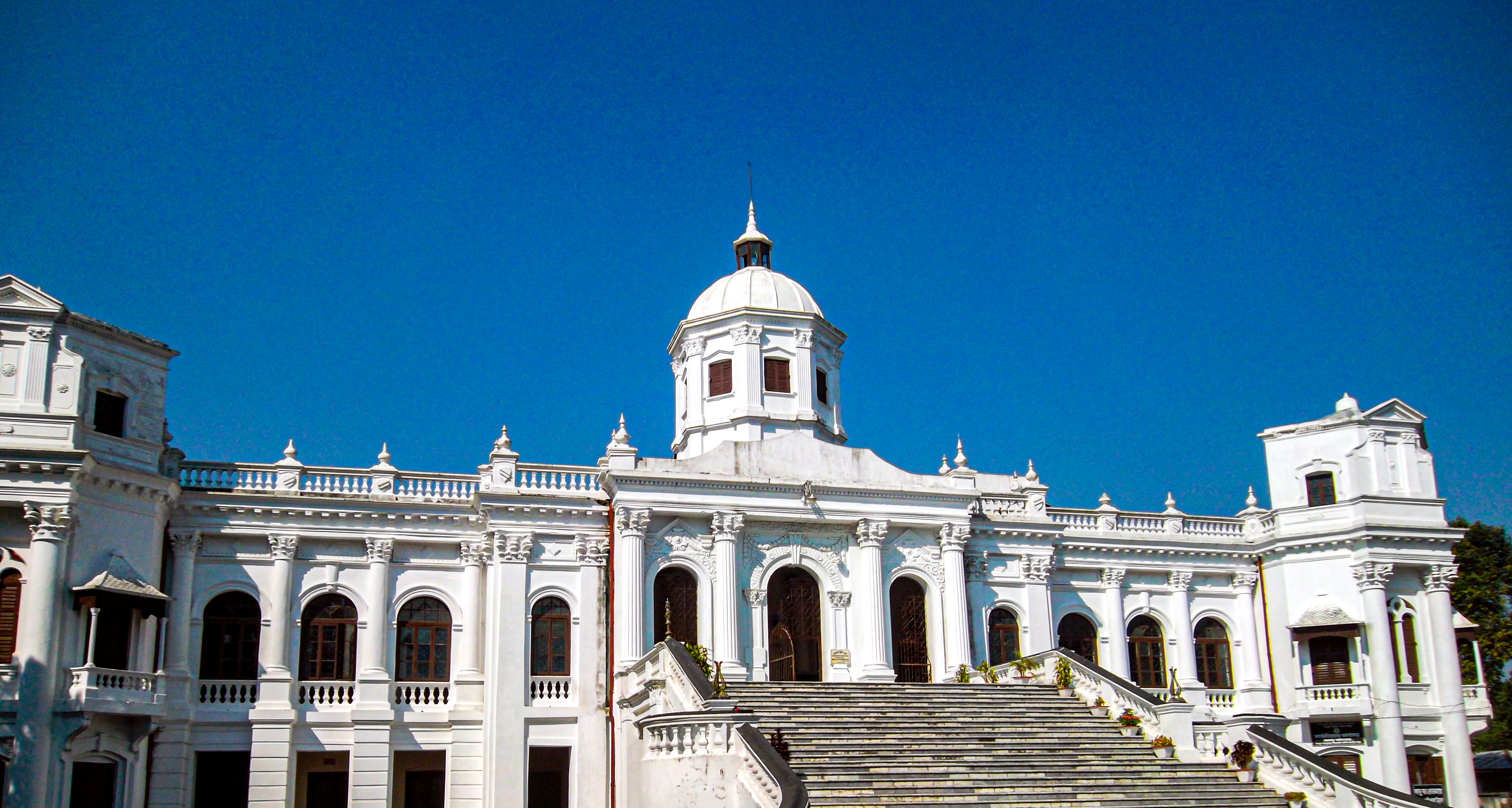
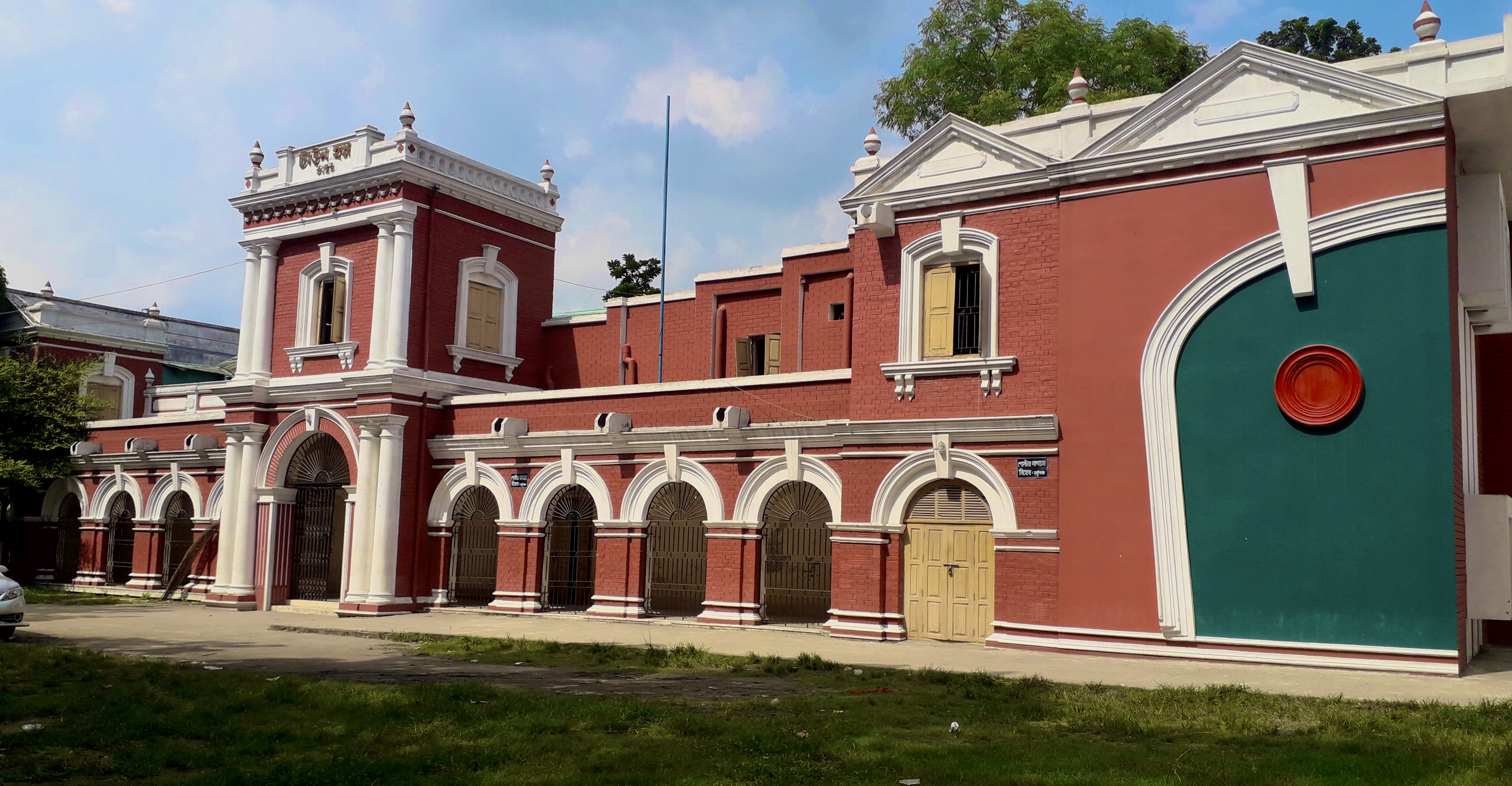
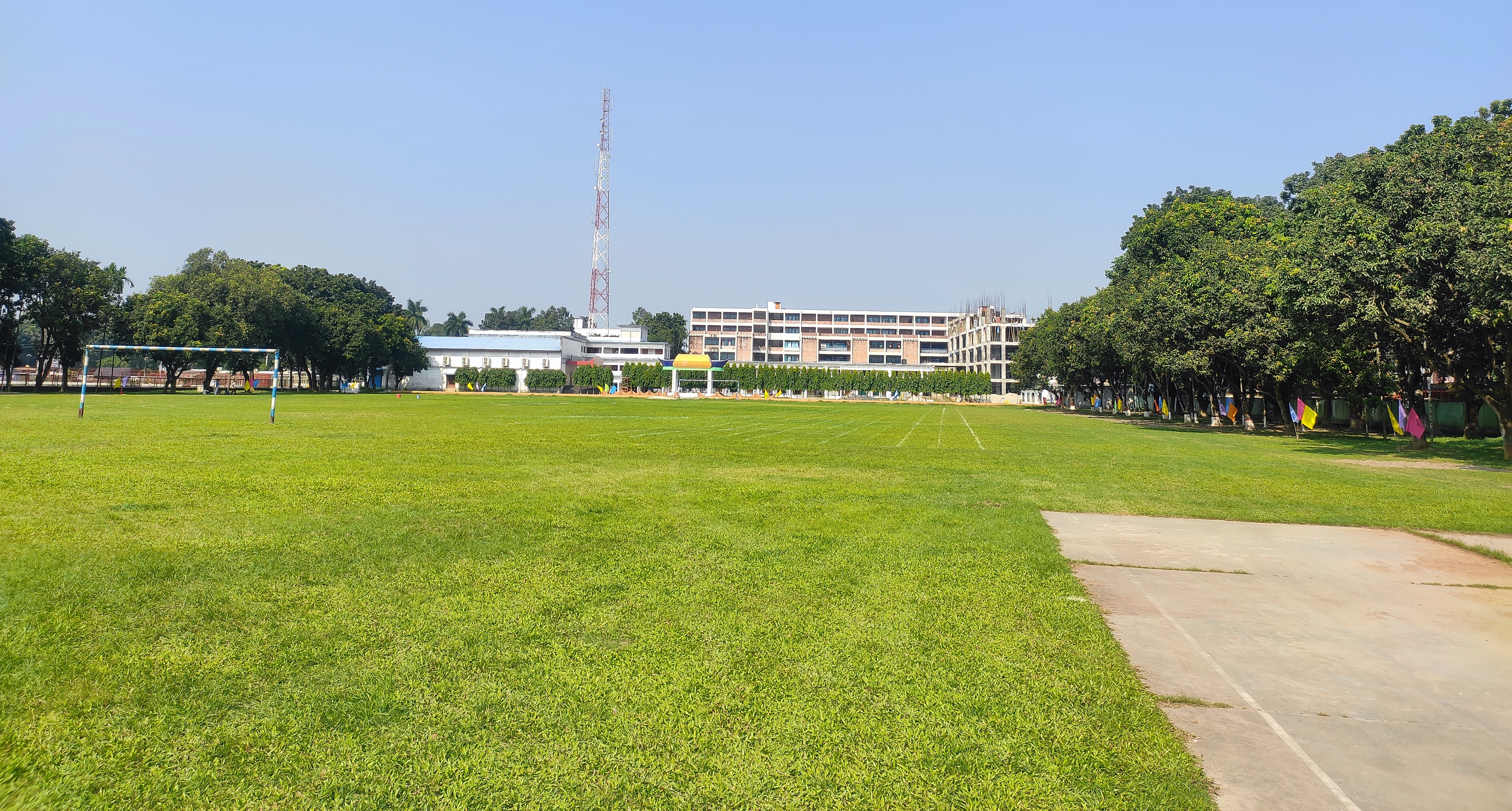
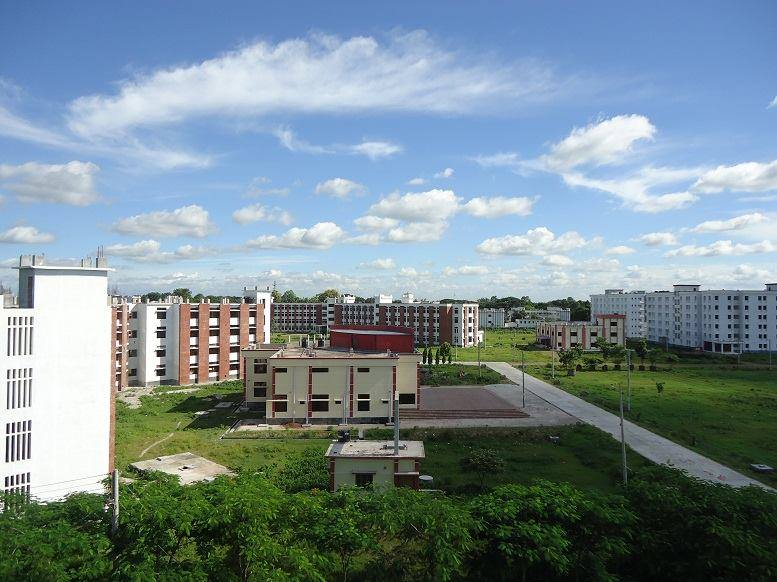
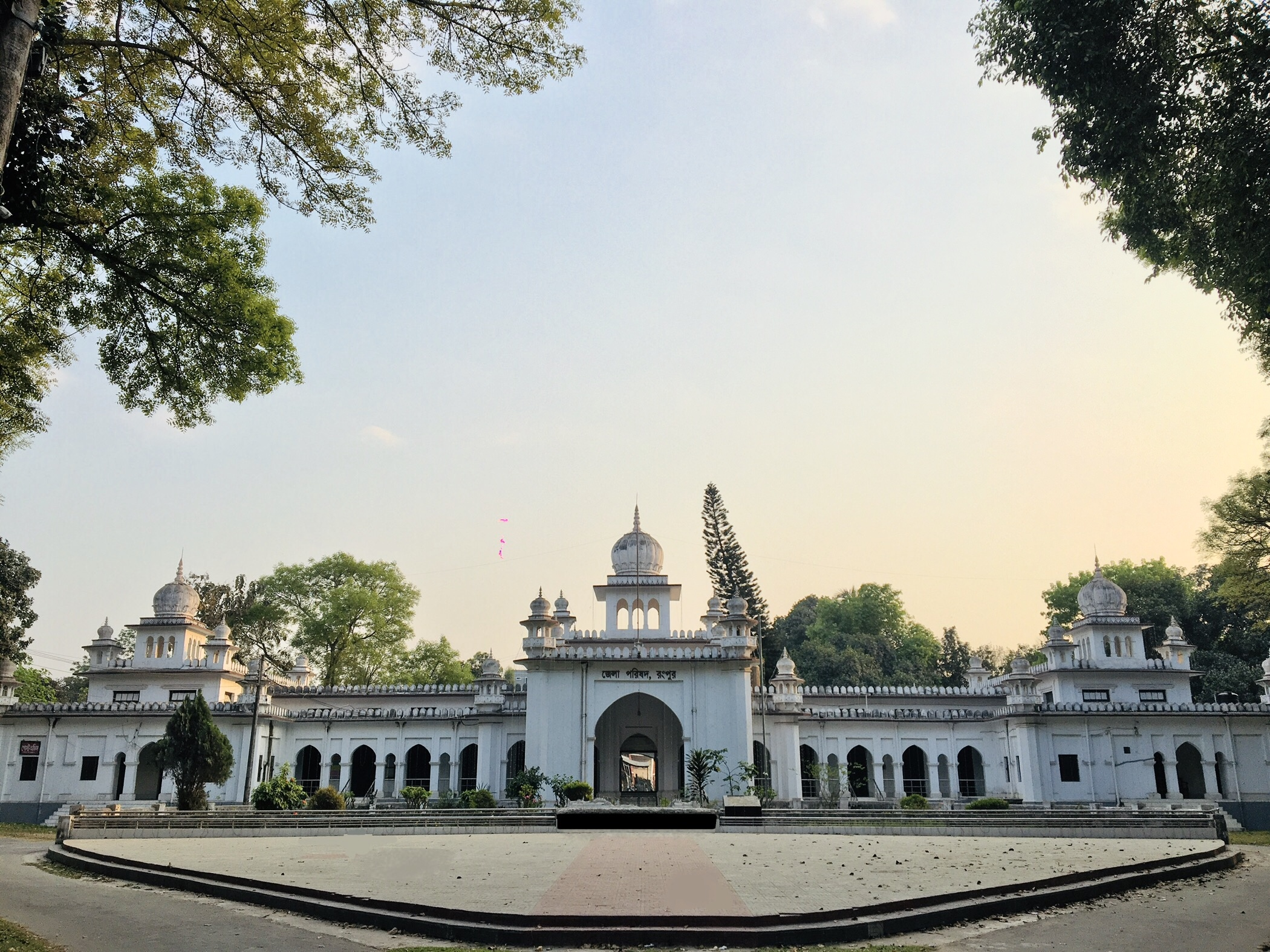
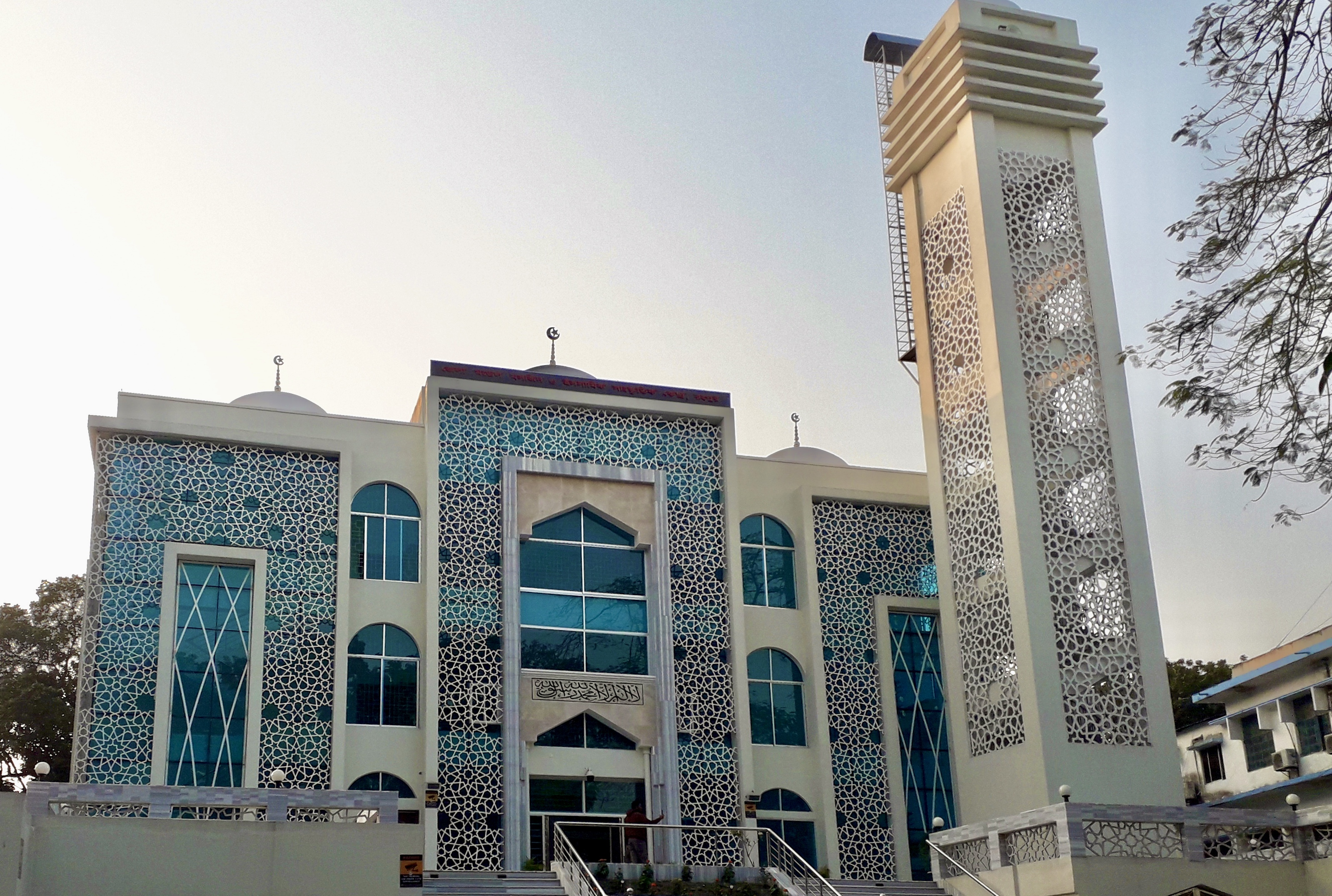
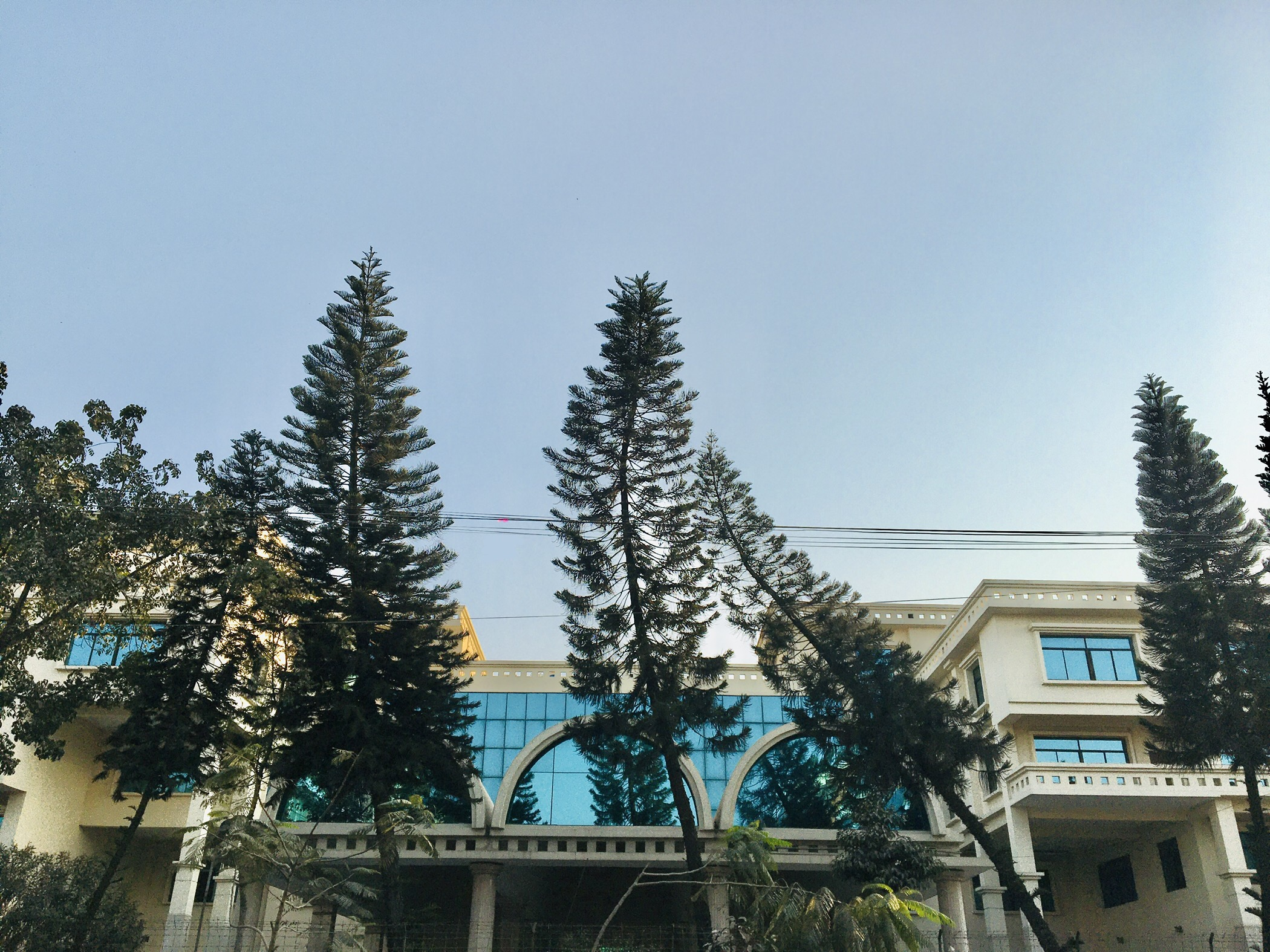
- Tajhat Palace Rangpur Town Hall Parjatan Motel PLSCR Rangpur University Rangpur Zilla Parishad Model Mosque and Islamic Cultural Center Bangladesh Bank
- Nicknames: City of Colours
- Map of Rangpur City Corporation in Rangpur Division

- Location in Rangpur Location in Rangpur Division, Bangladesh Location in Bangladesh
- Coordinates: 25.749°N 89.247°E
- Country: Bangladesh
- Division: Rangpur Division
- District: Rangpur District
- Establishment: 1575 (451 years ago)(During the Mughal Empire)
- Municipality: 1 May 1869
- City Corporation: 28 June 2012
- Metropolitan City: 16 September 2018

Government
  - Type: Mayor–Council
  - Body: Rangpur City Corporation
  - Administrator: Mahfuz Un Nabi Chowdhury
  - City Council: 33 constituencies
  - Parliament: 1 constituencies

Area
  - Rangpur City Corp.: 203.63 km^{2} (78.62 sq mi)
  - Urban: 32.03 km^{2} (12.37 sq mi)
  - Metro: 76 km^{2} (29 sq mi)
- Elevation: 34 m (112 ft)

Population (2022)
  - Rangpur City Corp.: 708,570
  - Density: 3,479.7/km^{2} (9,012.4/sq mi)
  - Urban: 485,867
  - Urban density: 15,170/km^{2} (39,290/sq mi)
  - Metro: 685,754
  - Metro density: 9,000/km^{2} (23,000/sq mi)
- Demonyms: Rangpurian (রংপুরিয়ান); Rangpuria/Rongpuria (রংপুরিয়া)

Languages
  - Official: Bengali • English
  - Native: Rangpuri
- Time zone: UTC+06:00 (BST)
- Postal code: 5400
- National calling code: +088
- Calling code: 521
- Police: Rangpur Metropolitan Police
- Airport: Saidpur Airport
- Railway Station: Rangpur Railway Station
- National Highway: N5; Asian Highway 2
- HDI (2023): 0.673 medium · 15th of 22
- UN/LOCODE: BD RAU
- Website: rpcc.gov.bd

Rangpur (/rɒŋpʊər/; Bengali: রংপুর, romanized: Rongpur; pronounced [rɔŋpuɾ]) is a major metropolitan city in Bangladesh. This city serves as the administrative center of the Rangpur Division. It is strategically located on the banks of the Ghaghat River and near the Teesta River. It is the second-largest city corporation in Bangladesh. The city has developed rapidly in recent years, with improvements in infrastructure and services enhancing its role as a key regional hub. Rangpur has become a key destination for students from other districts and cities seeking quality education. Rangpur features notable educational institutions. Rangpur also has a vibrant local culture, including traditional festivals and community events.

It is said that back in 1575, a trusted general of the Mughal Emperor Akbar took over Rangpur. But it was not until 1686 that Rangpur was fully integrated into the Mughal Empire. Back on 16 December 1769, Rangpur was announced as a district seat (zila sadar), and in 1869, it was announced as a municipality, thus making it one of the oldest municipalities in the country. However, Ghoraghat in Rangpur served as one of the Mughal administrative headquarters till the 18th century. The municipal office building was erected in 1892.

Previously serving as the headquarters of the greater Rangpur district, the greater Rangpur district was divided into five districts in 1984. Rangpur underwent administrative restructuring, resulting in the formation of the Gaibandha, Kurigram, Lalmonirhat, Nilphamari, and Rangpur districts.

== Etymology ==
It is said that the present name Rangpur came from the former 'Rongpur'. History has it that English colonial rulers in this region started cultivating indigo. Due to the fertile soil in this region, indigo cultivation was very profitable. The locals knew indigo by the name of "Rongo". So thus, this region was named "Rongopur". And from that, the name of today's Rangpur has originated. It is known from another conventional notion that the name Rangpur comes from the naming of Rangmahal (Palace of Entertainment) of Bhagadatta, son of Narakasura, king of the Pragjyotisha Kingdom.

== History ==
=== Mughal Period ===
According to Ain-i-Akbari, the Mughal period Rangpur consisted of three types of administrative areas. Rangpur was conquered by the army of Raja Man Singh, a commander of the Mughal emperor Akbar, in 1575, but it was not until 1686 that it was fully integrated into the Mughal Empire. The Mughal Empire was established in the whole of Rangpur in 1611 AD. Place names Mughalbasa ("a locality of the Mughals") and Mughalhat ("local market") organized by the Mughals bear testimony to the Mughal association and past of Rangpur and its hinterland. Later, Rangpur passed into the control of Sarker of Ghoraghat.

=== British Period ===
The coat of arms of Maharaja Gopal Lal Roy as depicted on a ground floor French door window panel of Tajhat Palace.

After the East India Company gained "Deoani" in 1765, Rangpur came under British rule. The Fakir-Sannyasi rebellion took place in the Rangpur region, in which leaders like Fakir Majnu Shah played a key role. The notable anti-colonialist rebels Devi Chaudhurani and Bhabani Pathak were from this region. In the Rebellion of 1857, the rebellious sepoys spread terror among the British rulers in the region. Later, in 1930, the first civil disobedience movement was started in different parts of Rangpur on the call of Congress. A meeting of the peasant leaders of North Bengal was held here in October 1946, and the Tebhaga movement began in November.

=== Pakistani Period and Liberation War ===
Rangpur was a district of East Pakistan Province during the Pakistani period. People of Rangpur took an active part in different movements like the Bengali language movement, Six point movement and 1969 Mass uprising. The first martyr from Rangpur in the liberation war was Sangku Samajhder, who was martyred on the date of 3 March 1971. Rangpur people started the Liberation War decisively on 28 March 1971, only three days after the Pakistani crackdown, by attacking the Rangpur Cantonment. During the Bangladesh Liberation War, Rangpur was under Sector 6 of the Bangladesh Forces and it was strategically important due to its proximity to the border with India.

=== Post-Independence Period ===
The greater Rangpur district was divided into five districts in 1984. On 28 June 2012, Rangpur Municipality was upgraded to Rangpur City Corporation, and on 16 September 2018, Rangpur was granted as 8th Metropolitan city of Bangladesh.

== Geography ==
Rangpur is the divisional headquarters of Rangpur Division. The soil composition is mainly alluvial soil (80 percent) of the Teesta River basin, and the remaining is barind soil. The elevation of Rangpur is 34 meters. The temperature ranges from 32 degrees Celsius to 11 degrees Celsius, and the annual rainfall averages 2931 mm. Rangpur town, covering an area of around 42 square kilometers, lies on the bank of the Ghaghat River and was turned into a municipality back in 1869.

== Climate ==
Rangpur has a humid subtropical climate (Köppen Cwa), also in the Trewartha climate classification (subtropical summer wet Cw). The four seasons of Rangpur are generally characterized as a summer or pre-monsoon season with high temperatures and frequent intense thunderstorms named Nor'westers (March–May); an intense and very wet monsoon season with substantial flooding in low-lying areas (June–September); a short and cooler autumn season (October–November); and lastly, the more pleasant, mild and drier winter season (December–February) with warm afternoons and cool mornings, with some cold nights. The average annual temperature in Rangpur is 24.9 °C (76.8 °F). In winter, it can be very foggy, and nighttime temperature can fall below 5 °C (41.0 °F), whereas daytime temperature remains around 20 °C (68.0 °F). About 2,192 mm (86.30 in) of precipitation falls annually, almost all of it falling in the monsoon season (June to September), Although there is very little rain from November to March, a small amount of precipitation can be seen due to Western Disturbance coming from the Mediterranean Sea.

Climate data for Rangpur (1991–2020 normals, extremes 1883–present)
Month	Jan	Feb	Mar	Apr	May	Jun	Jul	Aug	Sep	Oct	Nov	Dec	Year
Record high °C (°F)	29.4 (84.9)	34.4 (93.9)	43.3 (109.9)	42.5 (108.5)	41.2 (106.2)	38.2 (100.8)	38.4 (101.1)	39.8 (103.6)	38.5 (101.3)	37.2 (99.0)	33.4 (92.1)	30.6 (87.1)	43.3 (109.9)
Mean daily maximum °C (°F)	22.8 (73.0)	26.4 (79.5)	30.3 (86.5)	31.5 (88.7)	31.9 (89.4)	32.1 (89.8)	32.1 (89.8)	32.5 (90.5)	31.9 (89.4)	31.0 (87.8)	28.7 (83.7)	25.0 (77.0)	29.7 (85.5)
Daily mean °C (°F)	16.1 (61.0)	19.5 (67.1)	23.7 (74.7)	26.2 (79.2)	27.5 (81.5)	28.5 (83.3)	28.9 (84.0)	29.1 (84.4)	28.3 (82.9)	26.5 (79.7)	22.5 (72.5)	18.3 (64.9)	24.6 (76.3)
Mean daily minimum °C (°F)	10.9 (51.6)	13.7 (56.7)	17.6 (63.7)	21.3 (70.3)	23.4 (74.1)	25.3 (77.5)	26.2 (79.2)	26.3 (79.3)	25.5 (77.9)	22.9 (73.2)	17.7 (63.9)	13.3 (55.9)	20.3 (68.5)
Record low °C (°F)	3.5 (38.3)	3.7 (38.7)	8.6 (47.5)	14.7 (58.5)	16.4 (61.5)	19.4 (66.9)	21.1 (70.0)	20.7 (69.3)	19.1 (66.4)	14.2 (57.6)	10.1 (50.2)	5.2 (41.4)	3.5 (38.3)
Average precipitation mm (inches)	9 (0.4)	10 (0.4)	27 (1.1)	121 (4.8)	277 (10.9)	426 (16.8)	416 (16.4)	343 (13.5)	382 (15.0)	171 (6.7)	6 (0.2)	4 (0.2)	2,192 (86.4)
Average precipitation days (≥ 1 mm)	1	2	3	8	15	19	19	17	15	7	1	1	108
Average relative humidity (%)	82	75	68	74	81	85	86	85	87	84	80	81	81
Mean monthly sunshine hours	184.6	206.9	239.3	210.0	199.4	150.2	154.9	172.0	165.5	227.8	236.6	214.8	2,362
Source 1: NOAA
Source 2: Bangladesh Meteorological Department (humidity 1981-2010)

== Demographics ==
Historical population
Year	Pop.	±%
1950	34,000	—
1960	44,000	+29.4%
1970	68,000	+54.5%
1980	134,000	+97.1%
1991	191,398	+42.8%
2001	241,310	+26.1%
2011	300,659	+24.6%
2022	708,534	+135.7%
Source: popstat, pre-1991, citypopulation.de after 1991, 2022 census

Religions in Rangpur City Corp. (2022)
Religion	Percent
Islam	91.93%
Hinduism	7.98%
Other or not stated	0.09%

As of the 2022 census, Rangpur City Corporation had 170,733 households and a population of 708,570. 15.99% of the population was under 10 years of age. Rangpur had a literacy rate of 80.94% for those 7 years and older and a sex ratio of 103.79 males per 100 females.

According to the 2011 Bangladesh census, Rangpur city had 64,885 households and a population of 300,659. 51,791 (17.23%) were under 10 years of age. Rangpur had a literacy rate (age 7 and over) of 72.08%, compared to the national average of 51.8%, and a sex ratio of 926 females per 1000 males.

== Economy ==
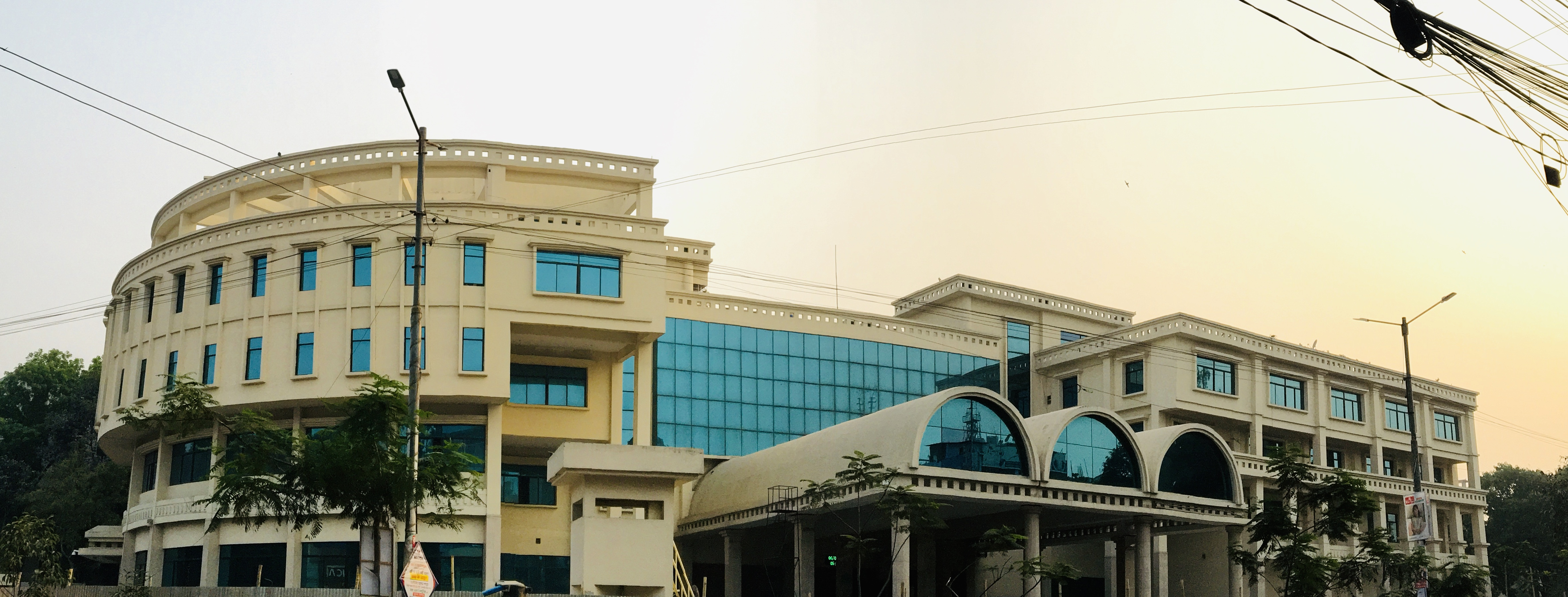
Bangladesh Bank Rangpur office

The city is a commercial hub. Its center has several government offices and private banks, insurance companies, residential hotels, and international restaurants, such as Chinese, Thai, Indian, and Mexican, convenience food, and gift shops. It is one of the most important economic zones in Bangladesh because of its global positioning. Rangpur is one of the major tobacco producing regions in Bangladesh. The northern suburbs of Rangpur are home to tobacco companies like British American Tobacco, Akij Group, and Abul Khair Group.

== Sports ==
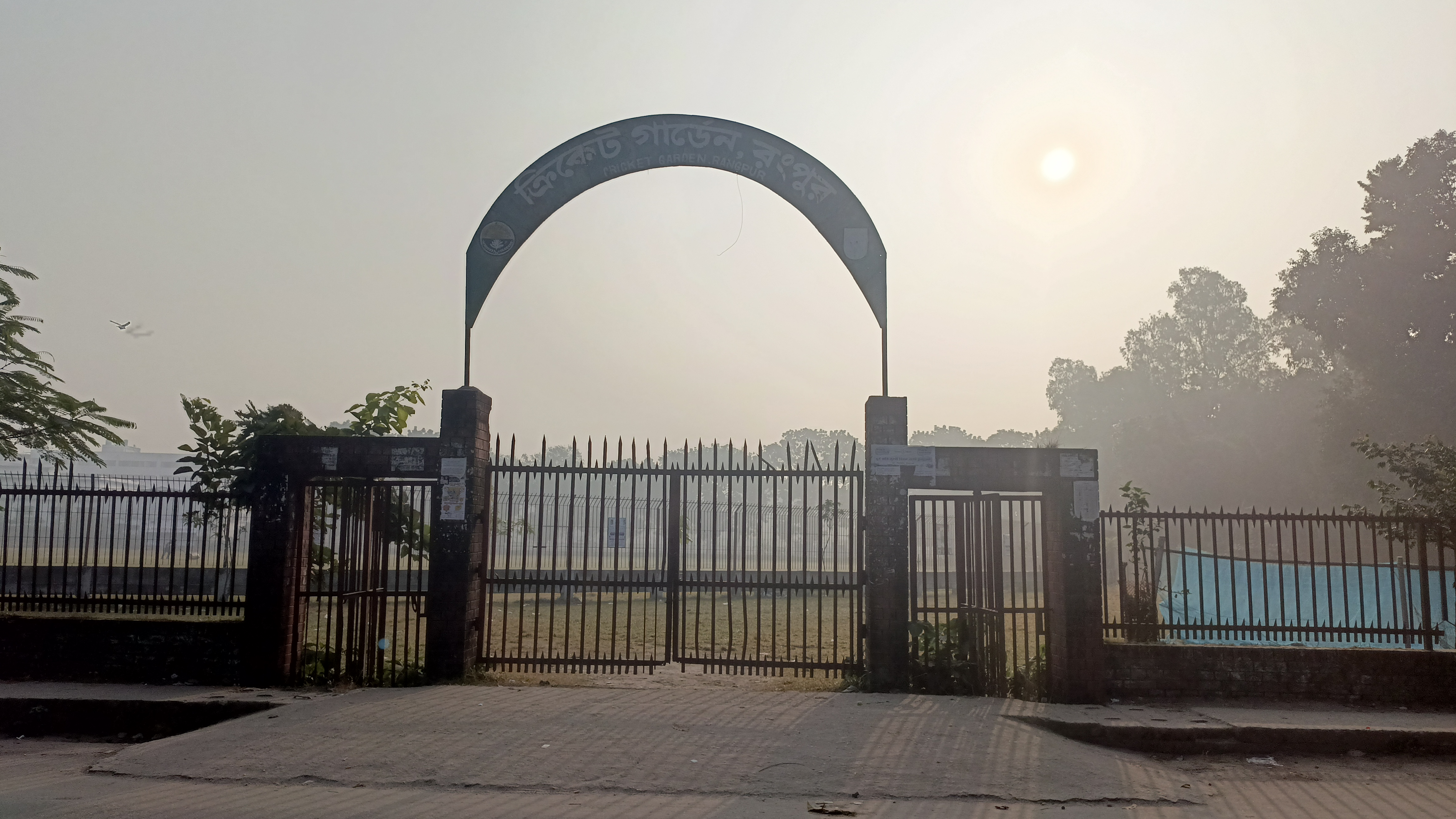
Rangpur Cricket Garden

Cricket is the most popular sport in Rangpur, Bangladesh, while field hockey, basketball, football, baseball, and tennis are also popular.

The most popular sport in Rangpur is cricket, although football is also popular. There is a 25,000-capacity Rangpur Stadium that is used for football and other sports. Another local stadium is Cricket Garden, which is mainly used for cricket. There are also a few sports training academies in the city. Rangpur has a Bangladesh Premier League franchise known as Rangpur Riders. In December 2012, I Sports bought the Rangpur franchise for $1.01 million, which is currently owned by Bashundhara Group. It also has a domestic cricket team named the Rangpur Division cricket team. Notable players from Rangpur who have played for the national team include Nasir Hossain and Suhrawadi Shuvo.

== Government ==
The Rangpur City Corporation (RCC) is responsible for governing municipal areas in the Rangpur Metropolitan Area. It was established on 28 June 2012. Rangpur City Corporation's total area is 205.70 square kilometers. There is a population of 796,556 people in the city corporation area. It is headed by the mayor of Rangpur. The mayor and ward councillors are elected every five years. The mayor's office has jurisdiction over all 33 wards of Rangpur. Its principal sources of revenue are municipal taxes and conservancy charges.

=== Military ===
Rangpur is the headquarters of the 66th Infantry Division of the Bangladesh Army.

== Education ==
Major educational institutions in the city including:

=== Universities ===
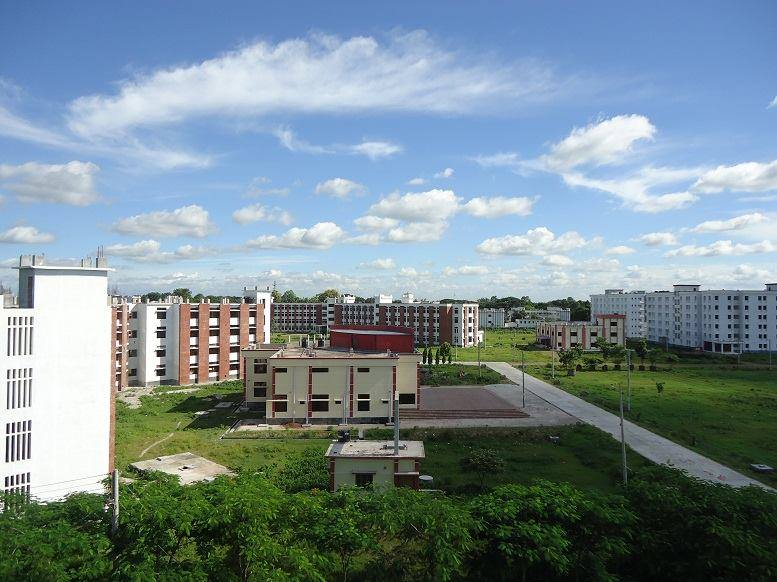
Campus of Begum Rokeya University, Rangpur

- Begum Rokeya University, Rangpur

=== Medical and dental colleges ===
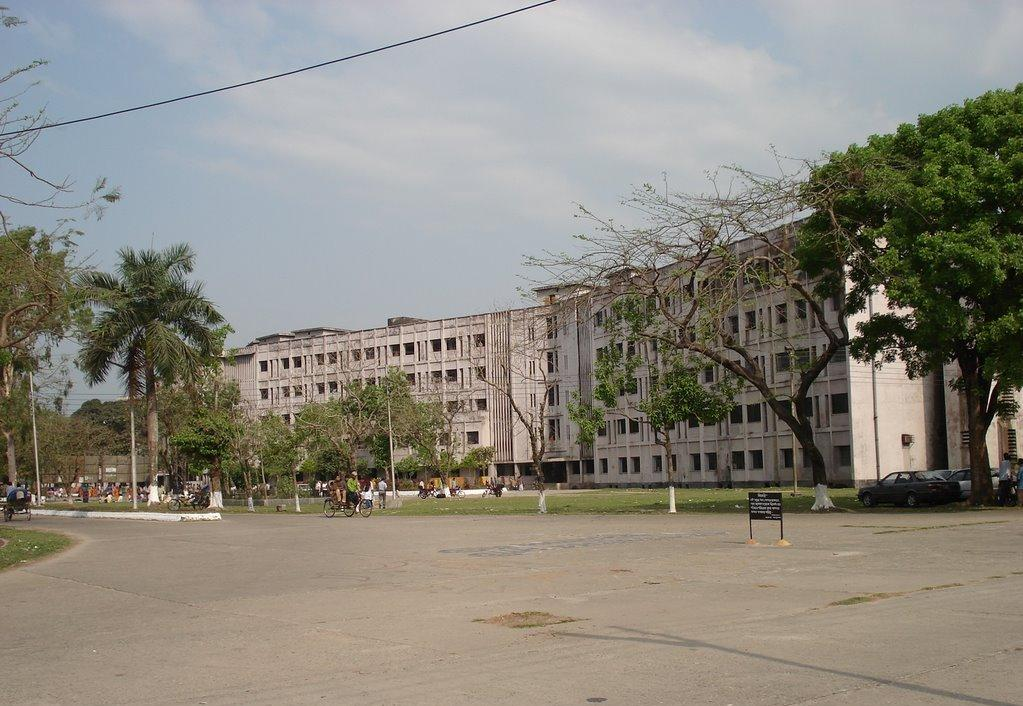
Rangpur Medical College

- Rangpur Medical College
- Prime Medical College
- Rangpur Community Medical College
- Northern Private Medical College.
- Rangpur Army Medical College
- Kasir Uddin Memorial Medical College
- Rangpur Dental College

=== Schools ===
- Rangpur Zilla School
- Police Lines School and College, Rangpur
- Cantonment Public School and College, Rangpur
- Rangpur Govt. Girls' High School
- Lions School and college, Rangpur
- Collectorate School and College, Rangpur
- Rangpur High School
- Shishu Niketan High School Rangpur

=== Colleges ===
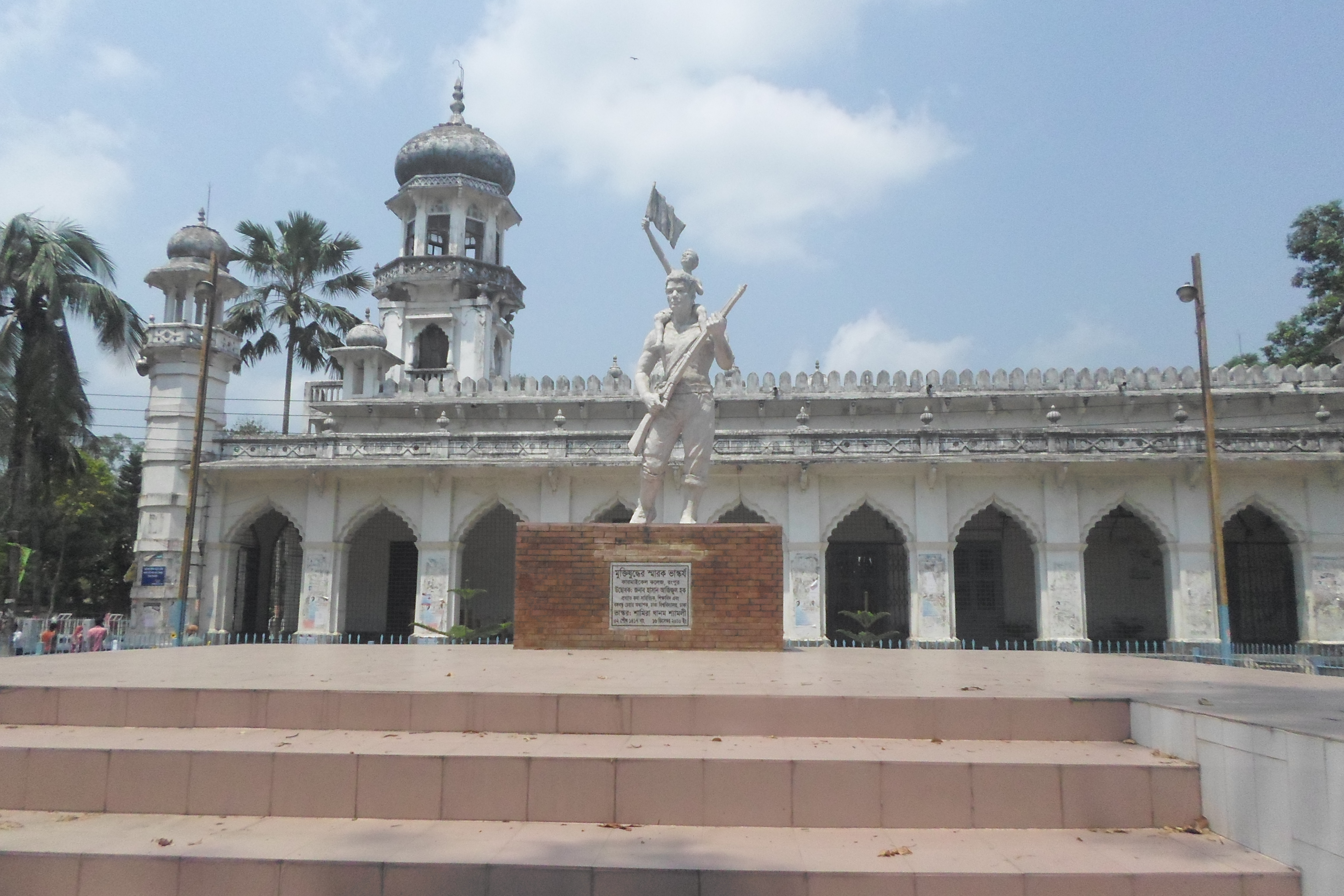
Carmichael College

- Carmichael College
- Rangpur Cadet College
- Police Lines School and College, Rangpur
- Cantonment Public School And College, Rangpur
- The Millennium Stars School & College
- BIAM Model School And College, Rangpur
- Rangpur Government College
- Begum Rokeya College
- Rangpur Engineering College
- Dr M A Wazed Miah Textile Engineering College
- Rangpur Marine Academy
- Collectorate School and College
- Carmichael Collegiate School and College
- Rangpur Technical School and College
- Rangpur Model College
- RCCI Public School & College
- Lions School & College
- Somaj Kolyan Women School & College
- Residential Model School and College
- Rangpur Public School and College
- Rangpur City College
- Siddique Memorial School & College
- Dhap Lalkuthi High School & College

==== English medium schools ====
- The Millennium Stars School & College
- International Grammar School
- BIAM Laboratory School
- Shahan International School
- Nalanda International School

=== Polytechnic institutes ===
- Rangpur Polytechnic Institute
- Rangpur Technical School and College

=== Affiliated colleges ===
- International Institute of Applied Science and Technology, Rangpur

== Neighbourhoods ==
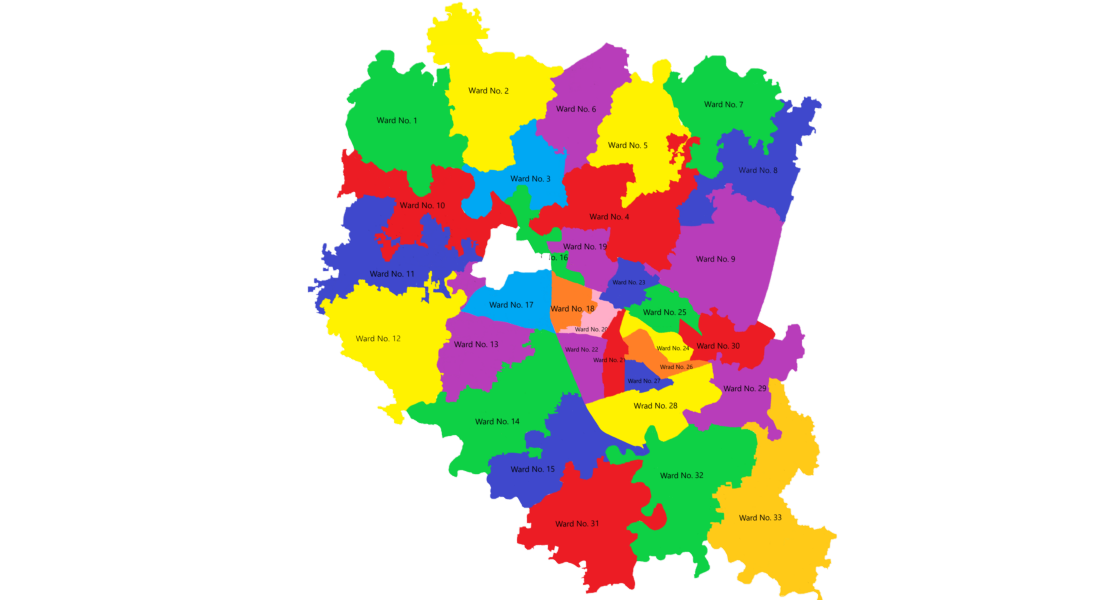
Wards of Rangpur City Corporation

Rangpur City Corporation is divided into 33 wards and different neighbourhoods (Mahallah), which can be categorized as Urban and Suburban.

- Burirhat
- Chabbis Hazari
- Panadardighi
- Uttam
- Hazirhat
- CO Bazar
- Dhap
- Kellabond
- Radhaballov
- Shimulbag-Sagarpara
- Keranipara
- Munshipara
- Lalkuthi lane
- Khalifapara
- Jummapara
- Jahaj Company
- Nababgonj
- Betpotti-Taltola
- Kotkipara
- Parjantan Para
- Modern
- Ashratpur
- Alamnagar
- Robertsonganj
- Darshana
- Lalbagh
- Khamarpara
- Islampur
- Pirjabad
- Parbatipur
- Mahiganj
- Tajhat
- Ganeshpur
- Babukha
- DC More
- Adarshapara
- Mistry Para

== Transport ==
=== Road ===
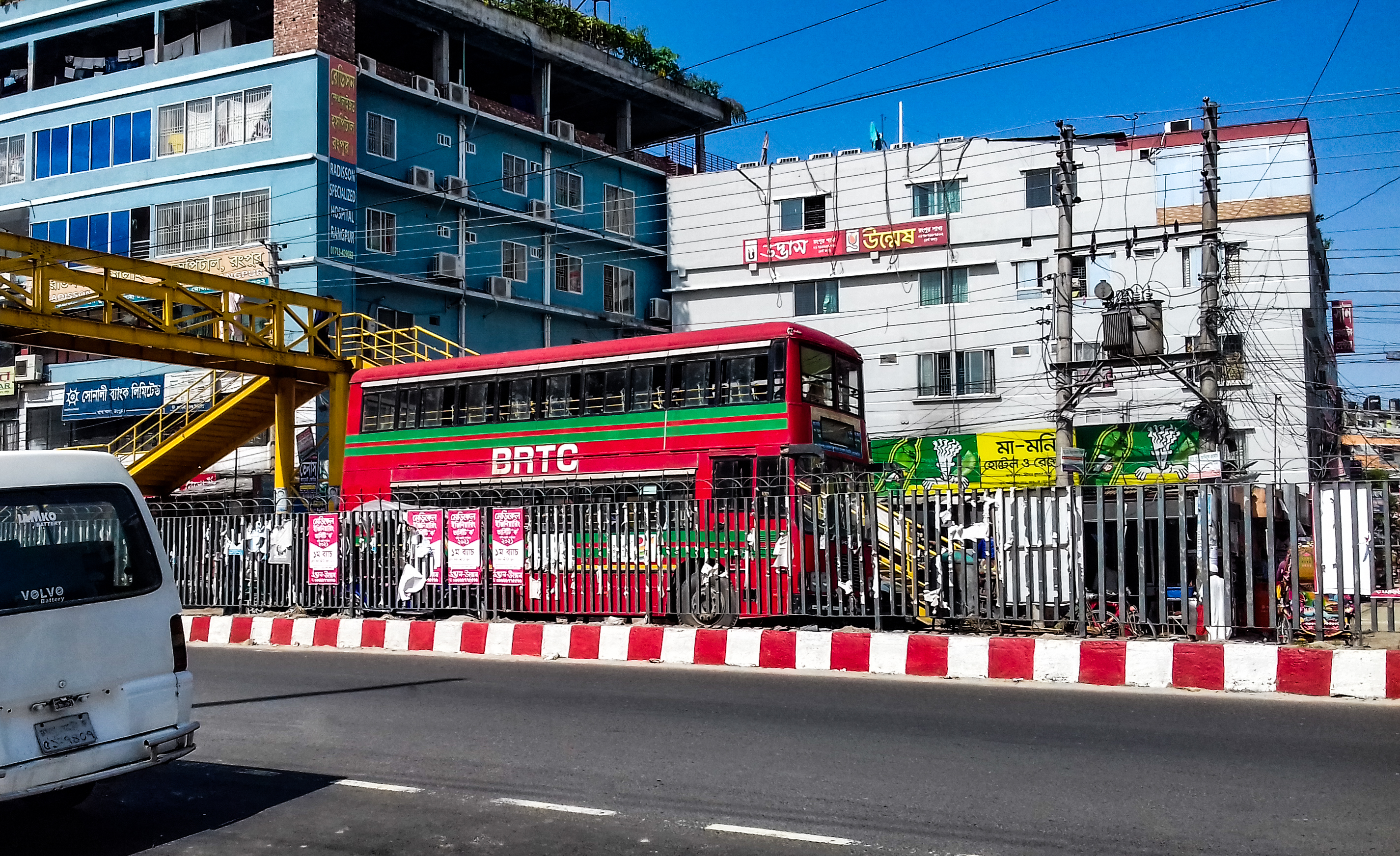
A BRTC double-decker bus of the City bus service in Rangpur.

Rangpur is well connected by highways to Chittagong and Dhaka, as well as other parts of Rangpur. It takes about 6 to 7 hours by road to reach the capital, Dhaka, by National Highway 5. Bus services to other major districts are also available from Rangpur. Highway links to India have been established through the Asian Highway 2. Rangpur also has a BRTC double-decker bus service, which connects the suburbs of the city to the city center.

=== Railway ===
The Rangpur Railway Station is the main railway station providing trains on national routes operated by the state-run Bangladesh Railway. The Rangpur Express is a Bangladeshi intercity train that runs between Rangpur and Dhaka. Other trains running between Rangpur and Dhaka are the Kurigram Express and Lalmoni Express.

=== Air ===
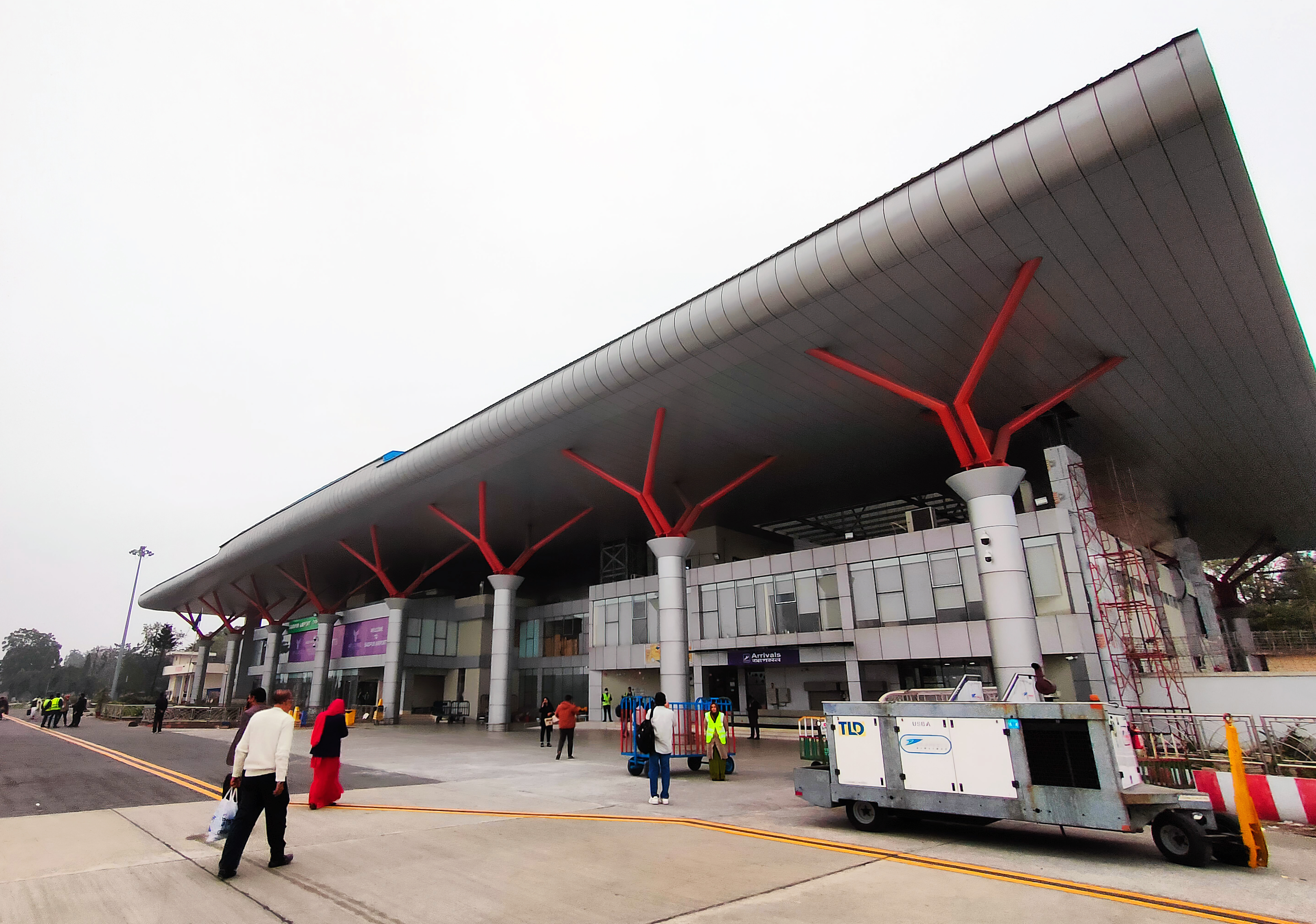
Saidpur Airport, Rangpur

The city of Rangpur is served by Saidpur Airport, located to the north of the city. Saidpur Airport is a domestic airport. Saidpur Airport is connected through several private airlines such as Novoair, US-Bangla Airlines, Air Astra, and Biman Bangladesh Airlines, a government airline with its main hub in the capital city of Bangladesh, Dhaka. A massive renovation is going on at Saidpur Airport ahead of its planned transformation into the new international airport for the northern Bangladesh region.

== Notable people ==
=== Presidents of Bangladesh ===
- Abu Sadat Mohammad Sayem, 6th president of Bangladesh
- Hussain Muhammad Ershad, former president of Bangladesh, founder of the Jatiya Party

=== Chief Justices of Bangladesh ===
- Abu Sadat Mohammad Sayem, 1st chief justice of Bangladesh
- Mustafa Kamal, Chief Justice of Bangladesh

=== Speakers of Parliament ===
- Shah Abdul Hamid, 1st speaker of the Constituent Assembly of Bangladesh also 1st speaker of the Jatiya Sangsad (Parliament of Bangladesh)

=== Chief Ministers ===
- Abu Hussain Sarkar, 4th Chief Minister of East Pakistan, one of the founders of the United Front, founder of the Bangla Academy, and a Swadeshi movement revolutionary

=== Civil servants ===
- Hassan Mahmood Khandker, 26th Inspector General of Bangladesh Police. He was the longest-serving Inspector General in Bangladesh Police's history.

=== Freedom fighters in the Liberation War ===
- Sharif Imam, husband of Shahid janoni Jahanara Imam

=== Performing and fine arts ===
- Asaduzzaman Noor, actor, politician, and activist. Former Minister of Cultural Affairs and MP, popular for his role of Baker Bhai in Kothao Keu Nei
- Abbasuddin Ahmed, Independence Day Awardee, Bhawaiya and Ghazal singer
- Debi Prasad Roy Chowdhury, sculptor
- Dipankar Dipon, film director and screenwriter who predominantly works in Dhallywood
- Ferdausi Rahman, Independence Day Awardee and Ekushey Padak winner, legendary folk and playback singer
- Mashiat Rahman, actress
- Mustafa Zaman Abbasi, Ekushey Padak winner and Bangladeshi musicologist
- Rathindranath Roy, founder of Bhawaiya academy and singer
- Rezwana Choudhury Bannya, Rabindra Sangeet artist
- Tulsi Lahiri, actor and dramatist

=== Officers of the Bangladesh Armed Forces ===
- General Mustafizur Rahman, 9th Chief of Army Staff of the Bangladesh Army
- Lieutenant General Hussain Muhammad Ershad, 4th Chief of Army Staff of the Bangladesh Army

=== Politicians ===
- Mashiur Rahman Jadu Mia (politician, founding member of the Bangladesh Nationalist Party, and senior minister with the rank of a prime minister in 1979)
- Tipu Munshi, Minister of Commerce of Bangladesh, former president of BGMEA, Awami League politician
- Mashiur Rahaman Ranga, Bangladeshi MP and Jatiya Party leader
- M. A. Sattar, chairman of Sattar Jute Mills Ltd, Minister of Jute and Textiles, Minister of Labour and Manpower, Member of Parliament, and Chief Whip
- Sharfuddin Ahmed Jhantu, first mayor of Rangpur City Corporation, Jatiya Party leader
- H. N. Ashequr Rahman, Bangladeshi MP, treasurer of the Central Committee of the Bangladesh Awami League. He is the chairman of Meghna Bank Limited and a member of the Board of Trustees, East–West University.

=== Poets, writers, and journalists ===
- Anisul Hoque, author, novelist, dramatist, and journalist
- Rashid Askari, university academic, bilingual writer, fictionist, columnist, translator, media personality, 12th vice-chancellor of Islamic University, Bangladesh and former Director General of Bangla Academy
- Buddhadeb Guha, author, novelist, and Bengali fiction writer
- Monajatuddin, journalist
- Rebati Mohan Dutta Choudhury, Assamese litterateur, Sahitya Akademi Award winner, and an academic

=== British revolutionaries ===
- Majnu Shah, leader of the Fakir-Sannyasi Rebellion. He used to operate in this region.
- Sri Aurobindo, British Indian philosopher, yogi, maharishi, poet, and nationalist. He spent his childhood here.
- Prafulla Chaki, British Indian revolutionary, famous for attempting to murder a British official along with Khudiram Bose. Studied at the Rangpur Zilla School.
- Devi Chaudhurani, revolutionary, one of the organizers of the Fakir-Sannyasi Rebellion

=== Reformers and activists ===
- Begum Rokeya Shakhawat Hossain, who was most famous for her efforts on behalf of gender equality and other social issues
- Karimunnesa Khanam Chaudhurani, Bengali poet, social worker, and patron of literature
- Abu Sayed, quota reform activist who participated in the 2024 Bangladesh quota reform movement. He was shot dead by the Bangladesh Police on 16 July 2024.

=== Scholars and scientists ===
- Annette Beveridge, British Indologist, known for her translations of the Baburnama from the Turki (Turkish) language, and the Humayun-nama from Persian
- William Beveridge, British economist who wrote the Beveridge Report that influenced the United Kingdom to implement welfare state policies after World War II
- M. A. Wazed Miah, reputed Bangladeshi nuclear scientist who was former chairman of the Bangladesh Atomic Energy Commission. He was the husband of Sheikh Hasina Wazed.

=== Sports ===
- Nasir Hossain, all-round cricketer
- Akbar Ali, cricketer, World Cup winning captain of the Bangladesh under-19 team in the under-19 World Cup 2020
- Mishrat Jahan Moushumi, women's footballer, Bangladesh Women's National Team
- Sirat Jahan Shopna, women's footballer, Bangladesh Women's National Team

== Gallery ==
Shapla Chattar

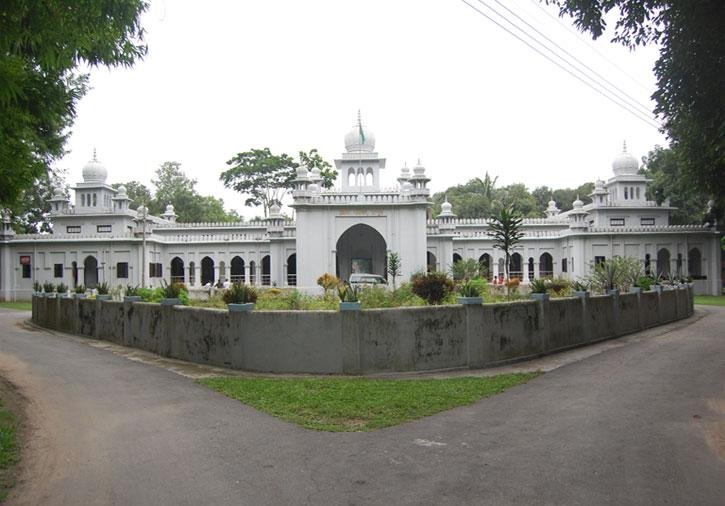
District Council Building

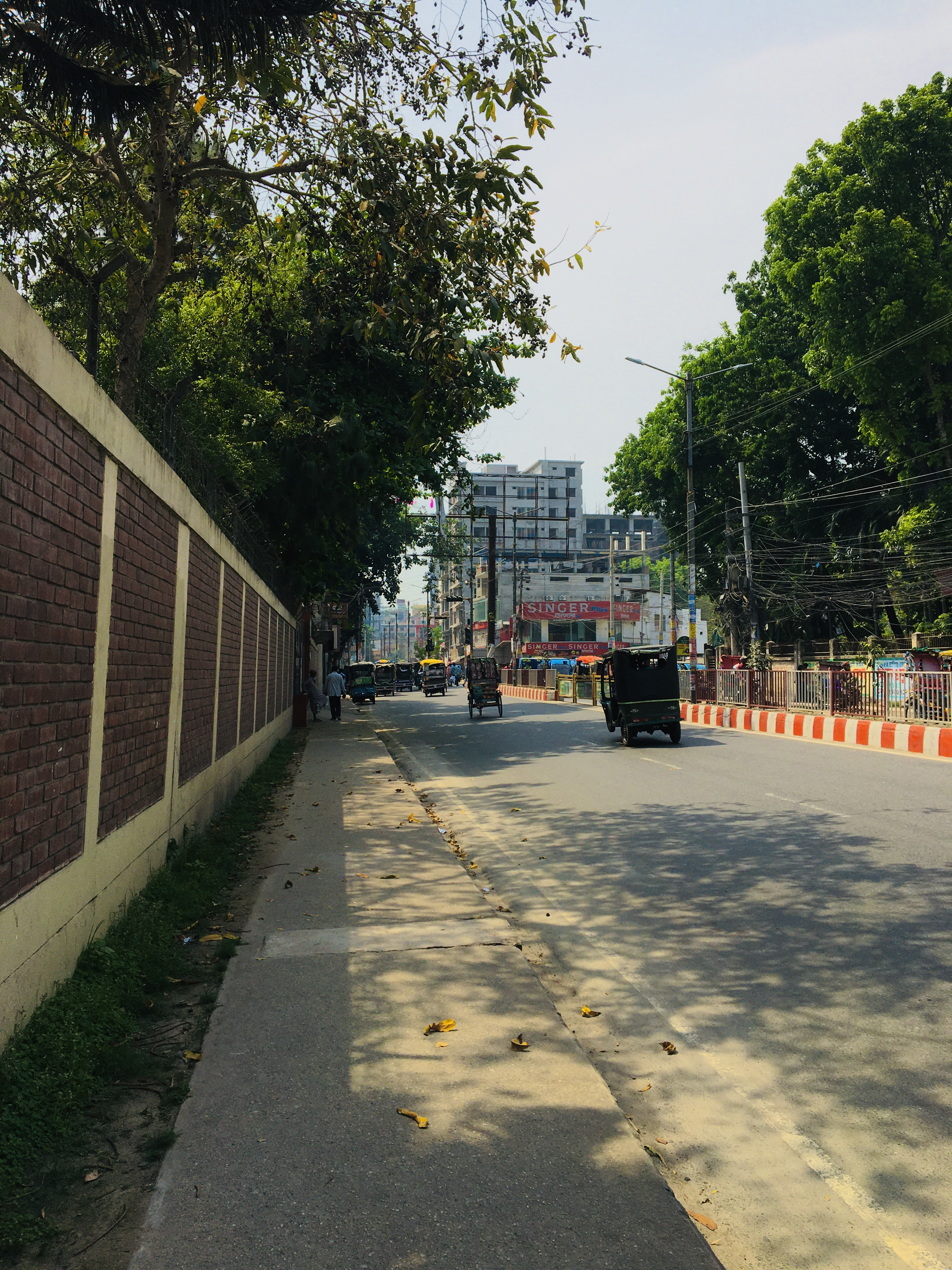
Highway

Parjatan Hotel

Terminal Mosque

Rangpur Modern Square

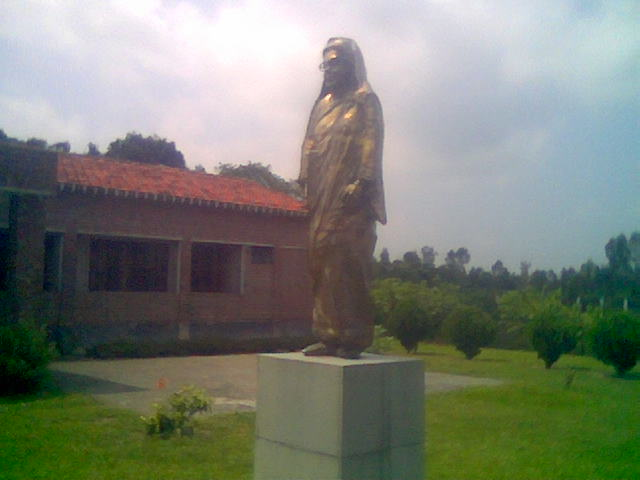
Begum Rokeya Memorial Centre

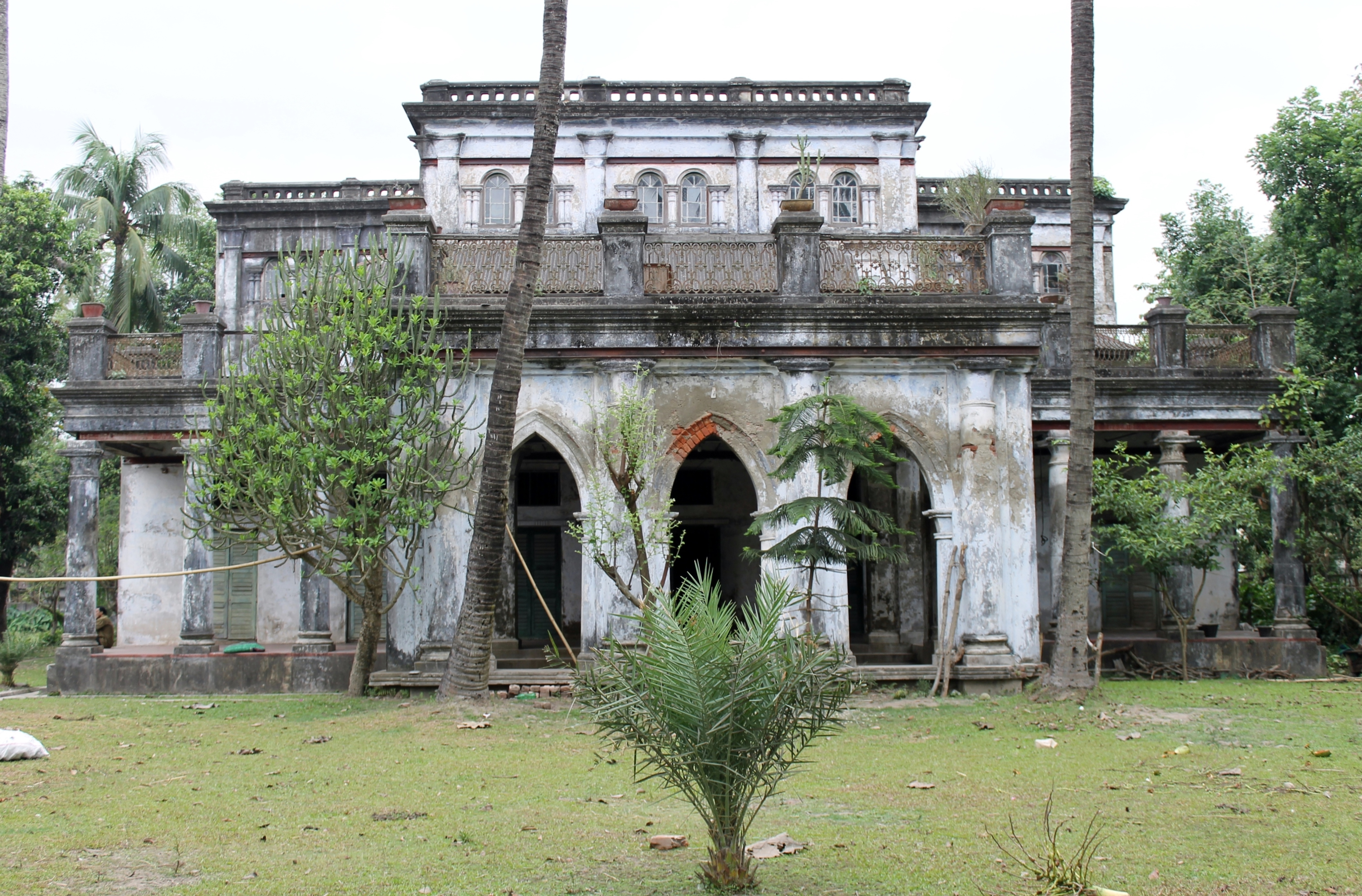
Jadu Nibash

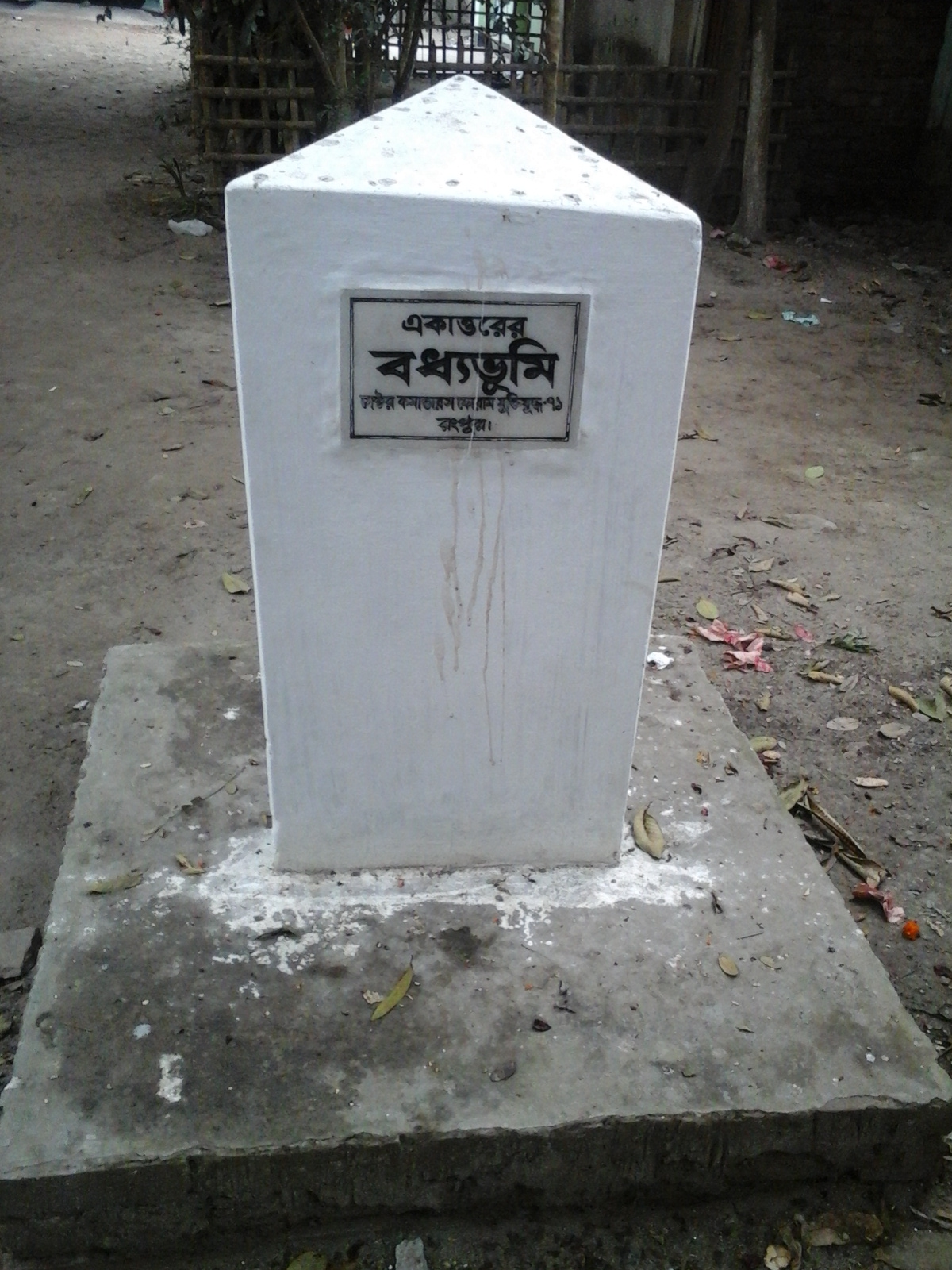
Memorial of 1971 Town Hall Massacre

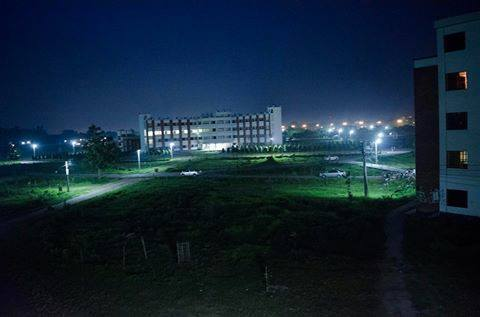
Begum Rokeya University

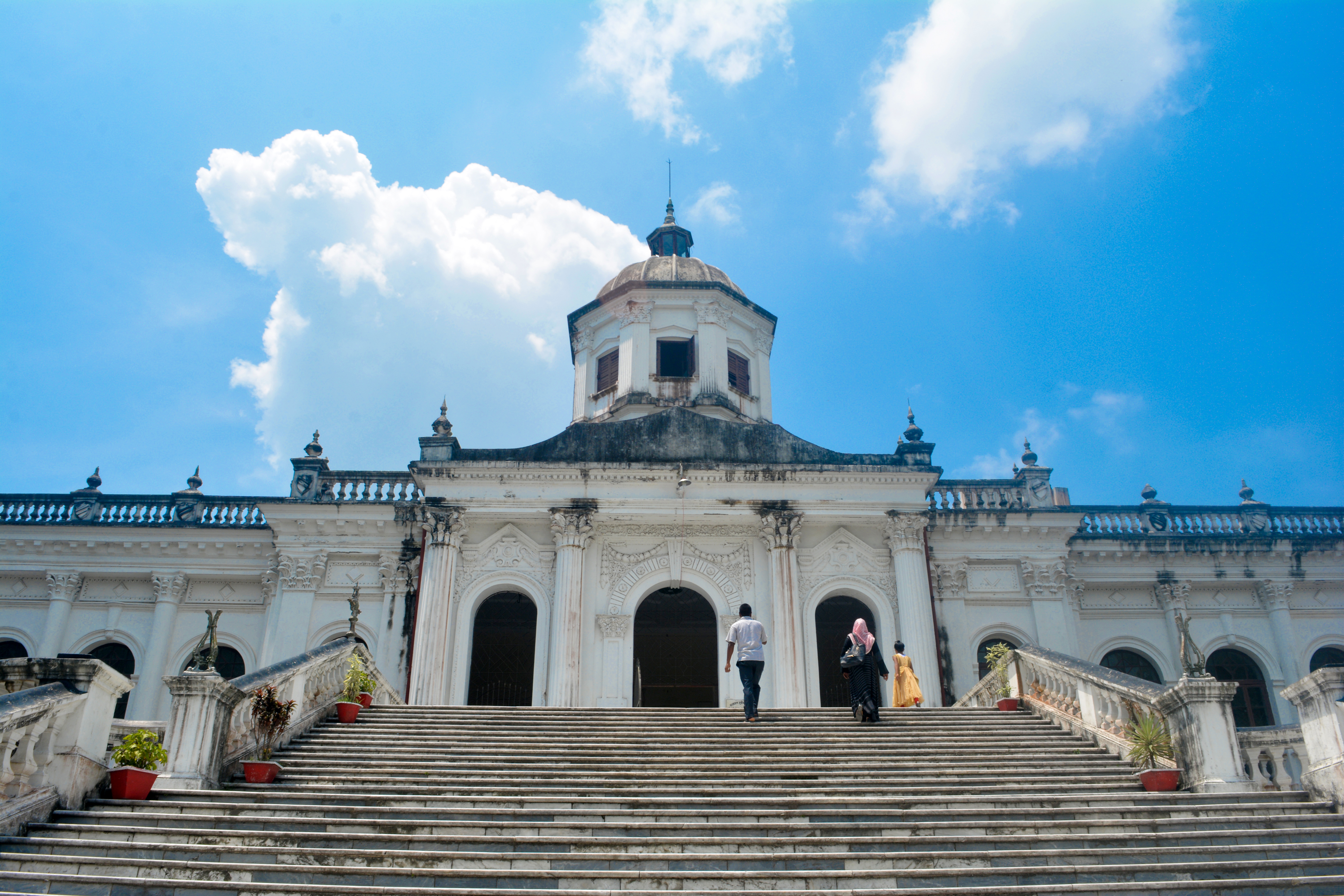
Tajhat Palace
