= Sylhet Polytechnic Institute =

Institute in Sylhet, Bangladesh

- Type: Public Technical Academic Institute
- Established: 1955; 70 years ago
- Principal: Mohammed Rehan Uddin
- Academic staff: 180
- Administrative staff: 80
- Students: 5572
- Location: Sylhet, Bangladesh
- Campus: Urban; 20 acres (8.1 ha)
- Affiliations: Bangladesh Technical Education Board, Dhaka
- Website: Website

Sylhet Polytechnic Institute (Bengali: সিলেট পলিটেকনিক ইনস্টিটিউট) or SPI is a state-supported technical academic institute located in Sylhet, Bangladesh. It was established in 1955 by the then Government of East Pakistan (now Bangladesh). It was named as Sylhet Polytechnic Institute in 1959.

== History ==
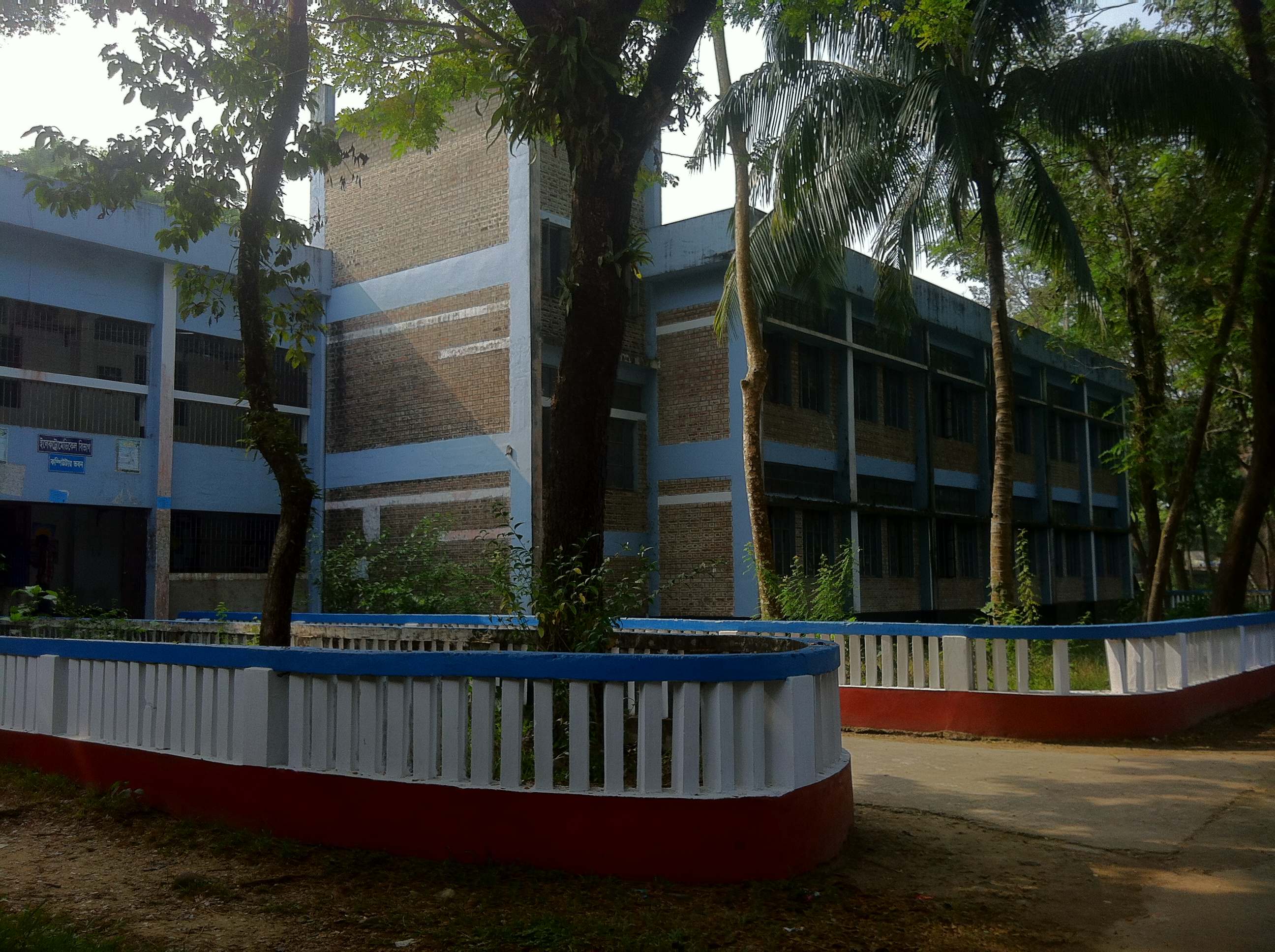
Computer Department, Sylhet Polytechnic Institute

In 1955, Ford Foundation established Sylhet Polytechnic Institute along with four other similar institutes at Dhaka, Rangpur, Bogra, Pabna and Barisal. At the beginning, SPI offered 3 years long courses, based on the syllabus of Oklahoma State University. The certificate issued by the then Technical Education Board was Associated in Engineering having provision to undergo Bachelor of Science courses in United States. Its formation and academic course history goes back to the birth of Ahsanullah Engineering College, which is now known as BUET.

The campus of SPI was designed by Muzharul Islam and Stanley Tigerman.

== Campus ==
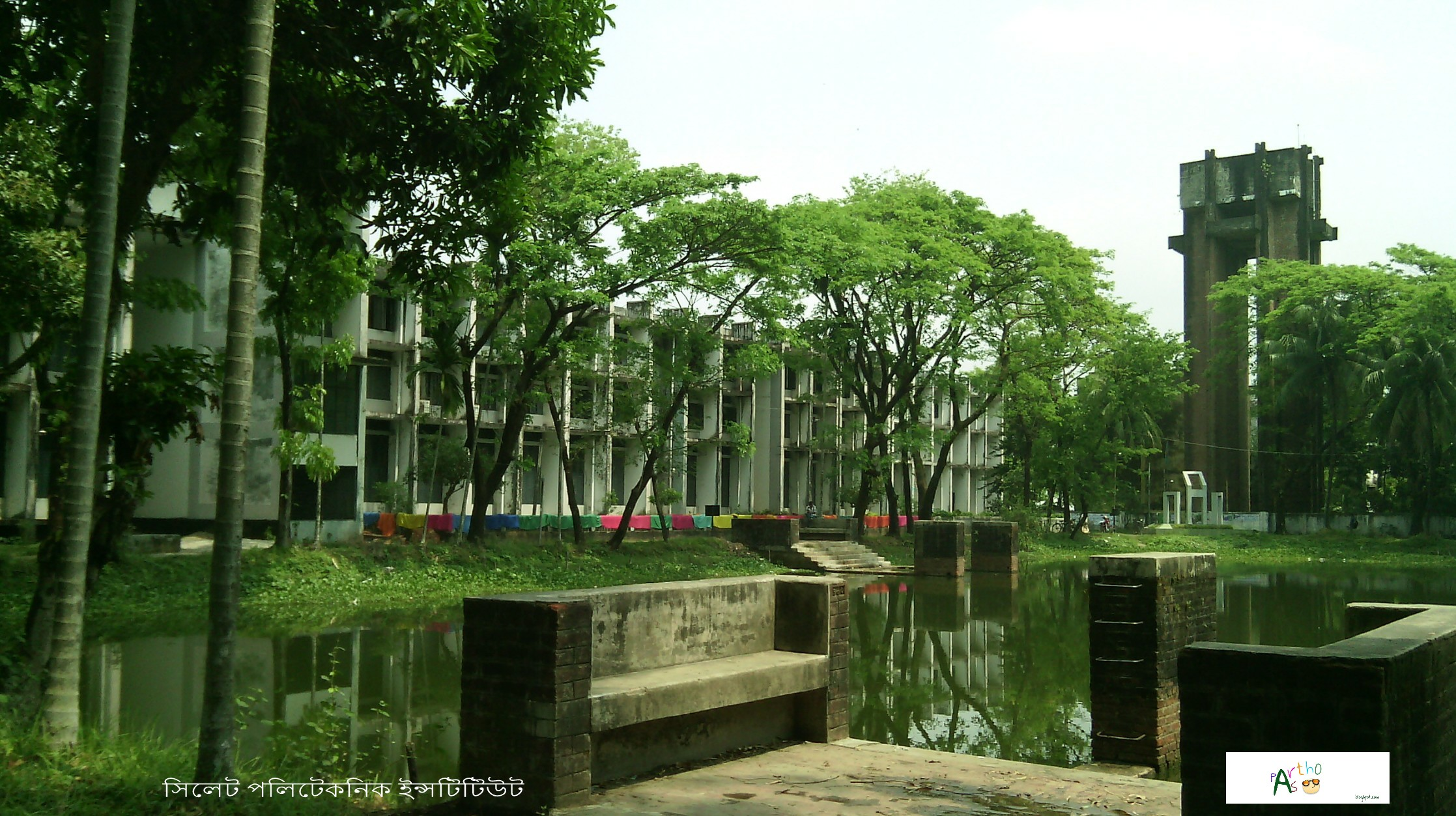
Sylhet Polytechnic Institute

== Admission ==
The minimum requirement for admission is Secondary School Certificate (SSC) or equivalent certificate with at least GPA 3.50 (65% marks) in average with minimum of GPA 3.50 in mathematics.

== Subjects ==
- Electrical Technology
- Mechanical Technology
- Civil Technology
- Electronics Technology
- Computer Technology
- Power Technology
- Electromedical Technology

== See also ==
- Bangladesh Technical Education Board
- Universities in Bangladesh
- Barisal Polytechnic Institute
- Dhaka Polytechnic Institute
- Satkhira Polytechnic Institute
- Mymensingh Polytechnic Institute
- Faridpur Polytechnic Institute
