= Shyamoli Ideal Polytechnic Institute =

Polytechnic Institute in Bangladesh

- শ্যামলী আইডিয়াল পলিটেকনিক ইনস্টিটিউট
- Other name: SIPI
- Motto: "শিক্ষা ও প্রযুক্তির জন্য এসো ,শান্তি ও প্রযুক্তির জন্য এগিয়ে যাও !
- Motto in English: "Come for Education and Technology, Go Ahead for Peace and Technology !
- Type: Private
- Established: 1979; 47 years ago
- Founder: M. A. Sattar
- Accreditation: Institution of Diploma Engineers, Bangladesh (IDEB)
- Affiliations: Bangladesh Technical Education Board
- Chairman: M. A. Sattar
- Principal: Engr. Ashutosh Chowkrabarty (Chittagong); Engr. Md. Anwar Hossain (Rangpur)
- Director: Mohammad Shahjahan
- Adviser: Prof. Md. Mostafizur Rhaman
- Academic staff: 320+
- Administrative staff: 50+
- Students: 10,000+
- Location: Dhaka; Chittagong; Rangpur; Lakshmipur, Bangladesh
- Campus: Urban
- Language: Bengali & English
- Colors: Fawn & Black
- Website: sipi.edu.bd

Shyamoli Ideal Polytechnic Institute (SIPI) (Bengali: শ্যামলী আইডিয়াল পলিটেকনিক ইনস্টিটিউট) is a private polytechnic institute in Bangladesh for providing 4 years Diploma in Engineering under BTEB. The institute has been established in 1979. It has four campuses located at Dhaka, Chittagong, Rangpur, Lakshmipur.

== History ==
Shyamoli Ideal Polytechnic Institute Shyamoli Ideal Polytechnic Institute was established in 1979 which has a glorious tradition. Principal M. A. Sattar is the founder. Shyamoli Ideal Polytechnic Institute (SIPI) operates Diploma in Engineering program under Bangladesh Technical Education Board. It was M. A. Sattar who started the institution with some students in 1979. Where today thousands of students are doing diploma courses. At present, the institute has 4 campuses in 4 districts.

== Academics ==
=== Departments ===
As of 2019, there are 14 Diploma in Engineering Departments in SIPI

- Faculty of Civil Engineering
  - Department of Civil Engineering
  - Department of Architecture
- Faculty of Electrical and Electronic Engineering
  - Department of Electrical Engineering
  - Department of Electronic Engineering
  - Department of Computer Engineering
  - Department of Telecommunication Engineering
  - Department of Graphic design Engineering
- Faculty of Mechanical Engineering
  - Department of Mechanical Engineering
  - Department of Automobile Engineering
  - Department of Textile Engineering
  - Department of Refrigeration/AC Engineering
  - Department of Garments Design and Patternmaking
- Faculty of Marine Engineering
  - Department of Marine Engineering
  - Department of Shipbuilding Engineering

=== Diploma courses ===
Serial	Program Name !
01	Diploma in Civil Engineering
02	Diploma in Architecture
03	Diploma in Electrical Engineering
04	Diploma in Electronic Engineering
05	Diploma in Mechanical Engineering
06	Diploma in Computer Engineering
07	Diploma in Textile Engineering
08	Diploma in Automobile Engineering
09	Diploma in Graphics Design
10	Diploma in Marine Engineering
11	Diploma in Shipbuilding Engineering
12	Diploma in Refrigeration
13	Diploma in Telecommunication Engineering
14	Diploma in Garments Design and Patternmaking

== Workshop and laboratories ==
=== Shyamoli Ideal Polytechnic Institute workshop and laboratories ===
- Textile Laboratory
- Automobile Laboratory
- Technical Laboratory
- Mechanical Laboratory
- Computer Laboratory
- Physics Laboratory
- Chemistry Laboratory
- Marine Laboratory
- Ship Building Laboratory
- Telecommunications Laboratory
- Basic Workshop Laboratory
- Electronic Laboratory
- Garments and Pattern Making Laboratory

== Affiliation ==
Shyamoli Ideal Polytechnic Institute is a Private technical education institute run by the Bangladesh Technical Education Board under the Government of the People's Republic of Bangladesh.

== Admission eligibility ==
SSC / equivalent pass

== Campus ==
=== SIPI has four campuses ===
1. Dhaka Campus, 16/C-D, Nurjahan Road, Bashbari, Near BRTC bus stand, Mohammadpur, Dhaka-1207
2. Chittagong Campus, 225 / A, CDA Avenue, Forest Gate, Muradpur, Chittagong
3. Rangpur Campus, Tajhat Road, Alamnagar, Rangpur Sadar, Rangpur
4. Lakshmipur Campus, M A Sattar Trust complex, dhaka-laksmipur highway, Mandari Bazar, Lakshmipur Sadar, Lakshmipur

== See also ==
- Bangladesh Technical Education Board
- Daffodil Polytechnic Institute
- Dhaka Polytechnic Institute
- Chittagong Polytechnic Institute
- Bangladesh Sweden Polytechnic Institute
- Chattogram BGMEA University of Fashion and Technology
