= Sultanuddin Ahmed =

Sultanuddin Ahmed was an engineer who was killed in the Bangladesh Liberation war and is considered a martyr in Bangladesh.

== Early life ==
Ahmed was born in Sarkarpara, Brahmanbaria District in 1935. He graduated from Chandpur High School in 1950 and graduated from Dhaka Ahsanullah Engineering College in 1959 with BSc in engineering. He graduated from Oklahoma State University with a MS degree in technical education.

== Career ==
Ahmed joined the Dhaka Polytechnic Institute in 1959 as an instructor. He was promoted in 1965 to principal and transferred to Faridpur Technical Institute. He went to the United States for further studies, and returned in March 1968 to join the Jessore Polytechnic Institute as principal.

== Death ==
On 25 March 1971, with the start of Operation Searchlight and Bangladesh Liberation war, his house was attacked by Pakistan Army. He was killed along with his male relatives present in his house.
