= Feni Government Polytechnic Institute =

Feni Polytechnic Institute
- Motto: Come for technology, go out for growth.
- Type: Government
- Established: 29 February 1964; Feni, Bangladesh
- Principal: Sheikh Mustafizur Rahman
- Academic staff: 6
- Students: 4000
- Location: Feni, Bangladesh; 23.031263°N 91.410709°E
- Campus: 15.97 acres (64,600 m^{2})
- Nickname: FPI
- Website: https://feni.polytech.gov.bd

Feni Polytechnic Institute is one of the government polytechnic institutes in Bangladesh.

== Description ==
This institute offers 4-year Diploma-in-Engineering courses under the Bangladesh Technical Education Board. The administrative and admission activities, syllabus design, examinations, and certification are conducted by the Bangladesh Technical Education Board under the supervision of the Directorate of Technical Education of the Ministry of Education, Government of Bangladesh.

== Location ==
The institute is located in Faleshwar Mouza under Feni, on the north side of the old Dhaka–Chattogram Highway, half a kilometer east of Feni Sadar Hospital, in the north-east part of Feni town.

== History ==
To expand and improve technical education and create skilled manpower, Feni Technical Institute started its journey on 29 February 1964 with Civil and Mechanical Technology. In 1972, with the introduction of Power Technology, Feni Technical Institute was upgraded to Feni Polytechnic Institute. Later, Electrical Technology was introduced in 1978, Computer Technology in 2002, and AIDT Technology in 2006, which gave the institute its present structure.

== Technologies ==
1. Electrical
2. Civil
3. Mechanical
4. Power Technology
5. Computer Science
6. Architecture

== Campus ==
The campus consists of a two-storied administrative building, a three-storied academic building, about 20 workshops, three residential halls, a 600-seat auditorium, a pond, a mosque, several playgrounds, a principal's bungalow, multiple residential buildings for teachers and staff, and is enriched with numerous fruit, forest, and herbal trees. At present, two Rover Scout units and one Girls-in-Rover Scout unit are active in an organized manner.
