= Feni Government Computer Institute =

Feni District Technical Education Institution

Feni Computer Institute
- (Feni Computer Institute Logo)
- Other name: FCI
- Motto: Knowledge Has No Limit
- Type: Govt. Polytechnic Institute
- Established: October 6, 2003
- Principal: Shuvadra Chowdhury
- Faculty: 25
- Administrative staff: 20
- Students: 1170
- Other students: 150 ^{SEIP}
- Location: New Ranirhat, Feni Sadar, Feni, Bangladesh; 23°02′04″N 91°25′09″E
- Website: fci.gov.bd

Feni Computer Institute (Bengali: ফেনী কম্পিউটার ইনস্টিটিউট, also known as FCI) is the first and only ICT based polytechnic institute for Diploma in Engineering courses in Bangladesh. It is situated in Feni Sadar Upazila of Feni city. Founded in 2003, It is directed under Directorate of Technical Education. Every year, around 300 students get accepted to their Diploma in Engineering programs to study about Information Technology. FCI is a member of Asia-Pac ific Economic Cooperation (APEC).

== History ==
The foundation of Feni Computer Institute was laid by former Prime Minister Begum Khaleda Zia on October 6, 2003, to convert the vast population into skilled and employable human resources in information and communication technology (ICT). It has an average enrollment of 200 students annually. Its Created in 2003 and Study Curriculum Activities Started from 2005 under Bangladesh Technical Education Board (BTEB).

It is specialized Institute for 4 years Diploma-in-Engineering Program. Every Year students from all over Bangladesh explode into FCI for admission because of its reputation made by only in a year. The just established FCI got Accreditation Certificate from Asia Pacific Accreditation and Certification Commission.

== Faculties ==
FCI provides two technology. they are :

- Telecommunication Technology (TCT)
- Computer Science and Technology (CST)

== Short courses ==
Short Course Lab Class

Feni Computer Institute has some Others Short Course for Unemployed people. Those Courses age convert the vast population into skilled and employable human resources in ICT of Bangladesh. Those Courses are:

- Web Design
- Graphic Design
- IT Support

== Campus tour ==
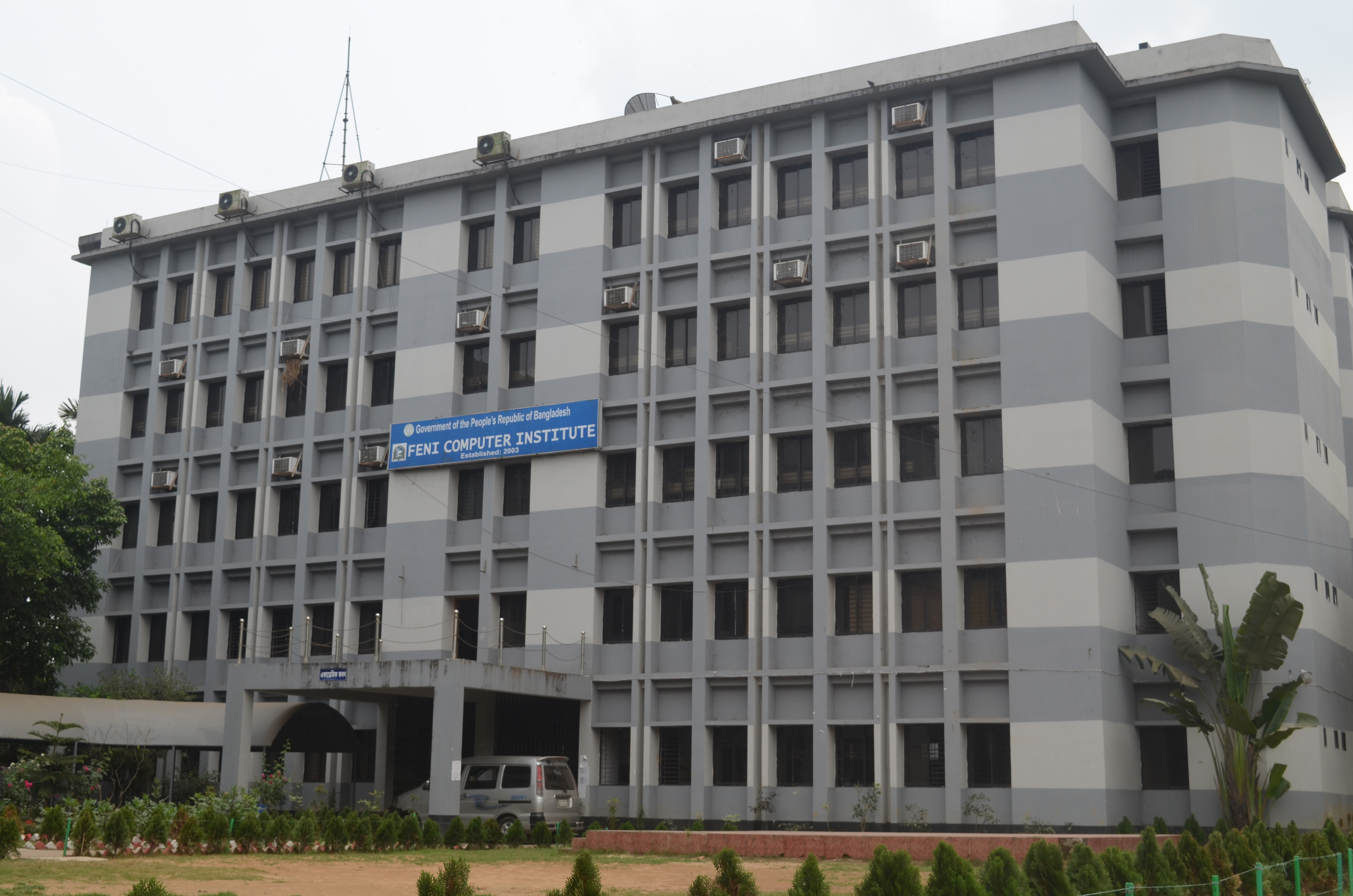
Feni Computer Academic Building

There are seven multi-storied buildings on the FCI campus. They are:

- Academic Building
  - Class Room Lab Room
  - Seminar Hall
  - Library
  - Medical Center
  - Satata Store
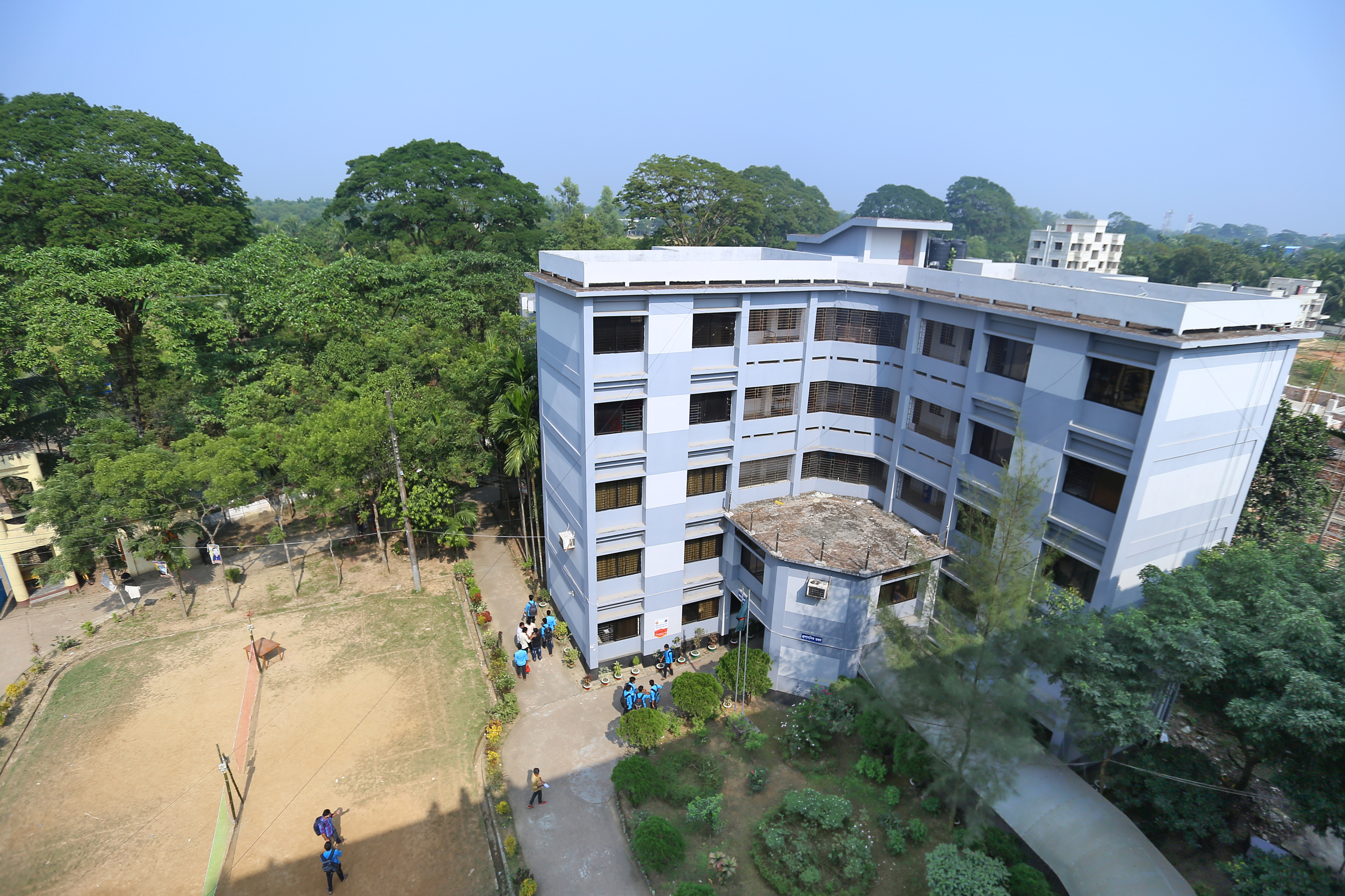
    Feni Computer Institute Administrative Building
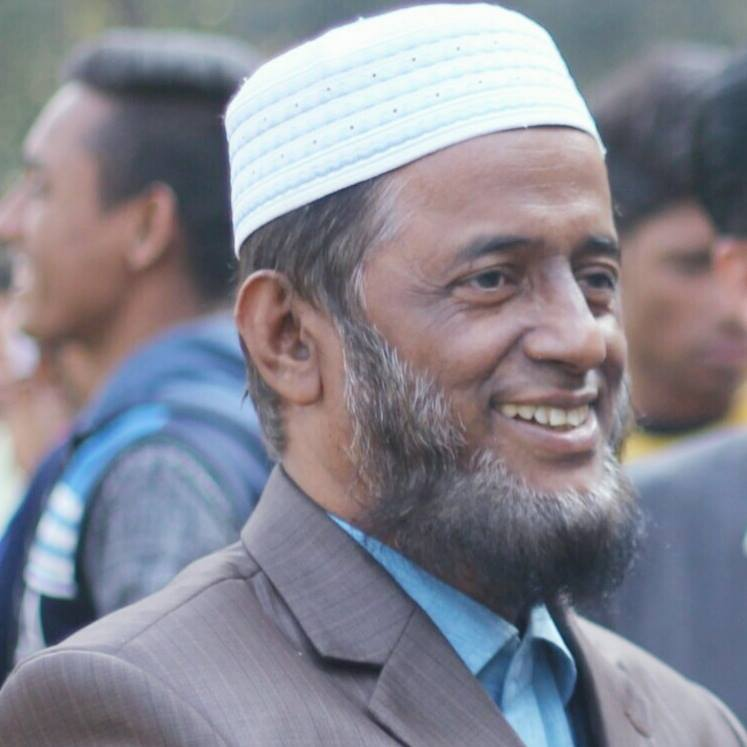
    Engr. Md. Rakib Ullah. Principal of Feni Computer Institute
- Administrative Building
  - Principal Office
  - Academic In-charge Office
  - Vice Principal Office
  - Information Center
  - Dept: Head Room (CST, TCT)
  - Teachers Room
  - VIP Guest Room
  - Children Care Center
  - STEP
  - SEIP
- Canteen
- FCI Mosque
- Boys Hostel
- Girls Hostel
- Principal Bungalow

== Student organizations ==
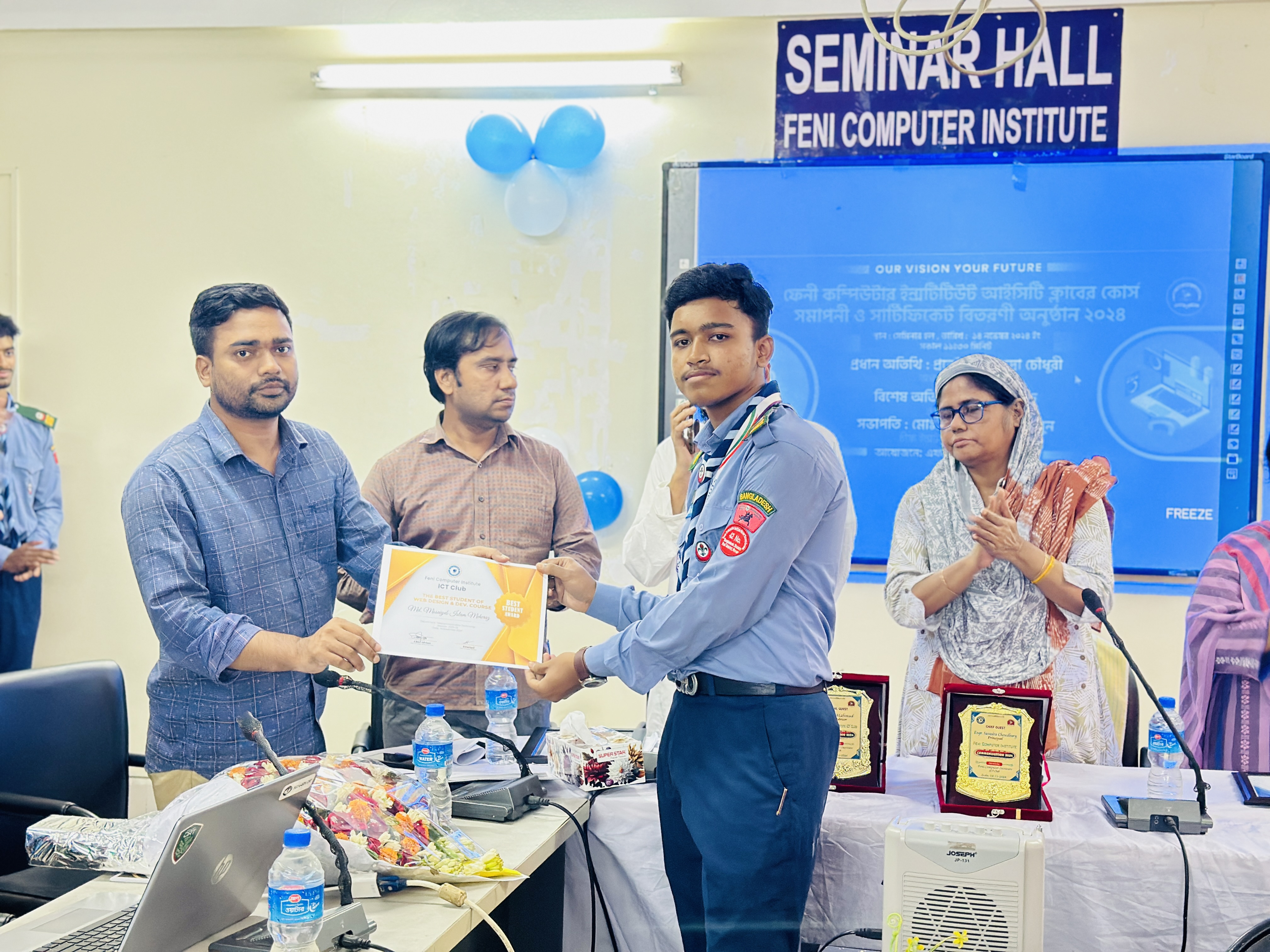

FCI has some student organizations for co-curriculum activities. They are:

- Feni Computer Institute Rover Scout Group(Boys)
- Feni Computer Institute Rover Scout Group(Girls)
- FCI ICT Club
- FCI Blood Donation Group
- FCI Ex-Student Association
- FCI BD Clean

== Clubs ==
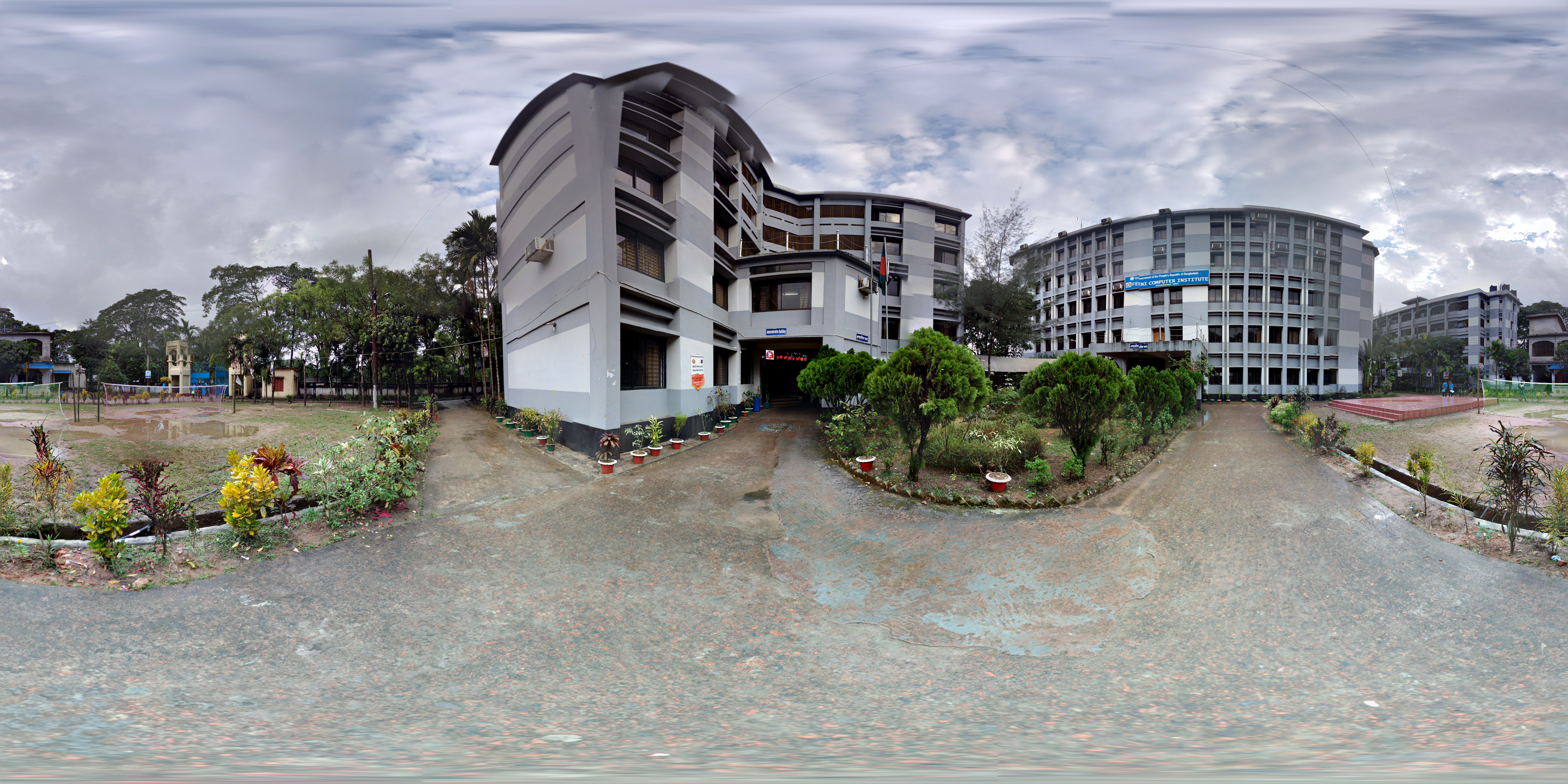
FCI 360 Picture

FCI has 5 active clubs.

- FCI ICT Club
- FCI Cultural Club
- FCI Blood Donation Group
- Feni Computer Institute Rover Scout Group
- FCI BDClean
- Road Safety Movement FCI Team
- Feni Computer Institute Debating Society

== List of principals ==
Sl No	Name	Role	Start date	End date
03	Syed Nuran Nabi	Principal (Incharge)	17-06-2011	15-09-2012
04	Md Abdul Mannan	Principal (Incharge)	16-09-2012	22-01-2016
05	Md Jahirul Islam	Principal (Incharge)	23-01-2016	04-10-2016
06	Mohammed Rehan Uddin	Principal (Incharge)	05-10-2016	07-11-2018
07	Engr. Md. Rakib Ullah	Principal (Incharge)	07-11-2018	08-09-2020
08	Md. Mosaddequl Bari	Principal (Incharge)	08-09-2020	12-08-2022
09	Suvadra Chowdhury	Principal (Additionial-Incharge)	12-08-2024	-Present

== See also ==
- Government of Bangladesh
- Ministry of Education
- Directorate of Technical Education
- Bangladesh Technical Education Board
