= Technical Teachers' Training College =

Teacher Training Colleges in Bangladesh

Technical Teachers’ Training College
- টেকনিক্যাল টিচার্স ট্রেনিং কলেজ
- Abbreviation: TTTC
- Formation: 1964
- Type: Public
- Headquarters: Dhaka, Bangladesh
- Region served: Bangladesh
- Official language: English
- Affiliations: University of Dhaka, Bangladesh Technical Education Board
- Website: tttc.dhaka.gov.bd/en

Technical Teachers’ Training College is an institute for the training of teachers for public technical and polytechnic colleges in Bangladesh and is located in Dhaka, Bangladesh.

== Location ==
The capital is located at 95, Shaheed Taj Uddin Ahmed Sarani, Tejgaon Industrial Area. To the north lies Dhaka Polytechnic Institute, Bangladesh University of Textiles, and to the west is Dhaka-Tongi Highway.

== History ==
The establishment of the Technical Teachers Training College (TTTC) dates back to 1960 as the teachers’ wing of the Dhaka Polytechnic Institute. It underwent rapid growth and development and in 1964 emerged as a separate college called the Technical Education College (TEC). In 1967 the college was renamed the Technical Teachers Training College.

In 1981, with the opening of a separate Engineering College (Presently Dhaka University of Engineering) on the campus of TTTC it suffered a break in its activities. TTTC was reborn in 1986 with renewed philosophy and naturally with activities in tune with modern trends in the arena of training technical teachers internationally. TTTC owes its growth and development since its rebirth mostly to the technical assistance provided by ODA (UK). It is under the Directorate of Technical Education of the Ministry of Education.

== Department ==
- Electrical & Electronics Engineering
- Mechanical Engineering
- Civil Engineering
- Non Tech Department

== Degrees offered ==
1. Diploma in Technical Education under Bangladesh Technical Education Board

2. B.Sc. in Technical Education under University of Dhaka

== Dormitory and quarters ==
- Technical Teachers' Training College (TTTC) Officer's Quarter
- Students Dormitory
