= Bangladesh Survey Institute =

Government technical educational institution located in Comilla District, Bangladesh

- Type: Government Polytechnic Institute
- Established: 1914; 112 years ago
- Affiliations: Bangladesh Technical Education Board
- Principal: Engineer Md. Mobarak Hossain
- Academic staff: 20
- Students: 784
- Location: Rammala, Comilla, 3500, Bangladesh; 23.448973°N 91.174955°E
- Campus: Urban 14.17 acres (5.73 ha)
- Nickname: BSI
- Website: bsi.polytech.gov.bd

Bangladesh Survey Institute is a government technical educational institution located in Comilla District, Bangladesh. Established in 1914, the institute is affiliated with the Bangladesh Technical Education Board.

== Overview ==
The Bangladesh Survey Institute is an educational institution under the Directorate of Technical Education of the Ministry of Education. It was established in 1914. The institute offers a four-year Diploma in Engineering (Survey) program. Academic activities are conducted in two shifts. Through this program, students are trained to develop their skills and become competent human resources. Graduates of this course are employed both in national and international organizations related to the field. Diploma holders in Survey Engineering are appointed as 10th grade (Class II) officers in government and autonomous organizations.

=== Technology ===
Currently, the Bangladesh Survey Institute offers diploma programs in two technologies: Surveying and Land Resource Survey & Environment Technology. Each technology admits 300 students in two shifts. Additionally, three more technologies are proposed: Geoinformatics, Photogrammetry & Remote Sensing, and Cadastral, Topographic Surveying & Land Information Technology.

== Infrastructure ==
The campus covers an area of 14.17 acres. It includes an 3-storey academic building, a 5-storey administrative building, a 5-storey multipurpose building, a new 4 storied student hostel (Gomti Hostel), library, and a pond.
