= Bangladesh Sweden Polytechnic Institute =

Engineering college in Bangladesh

Bangladesh Sweden Government Polytechnic Institute
- বাংলাদেশ সুইডেন সরকারি পলিটেকনিক ইনস্টিটিউট
- Other name: BSGPI (Swedish)
- Former name: Swedish-Pakistan Institute of Technology
- Motto in English: Technical education brings success and prosperity to life.
- Type: Public
- Established: 1963; 63 years ago
- Accreditation: Institution of Diploma Engineers, Bangladesh (IDEB)
- Affiliations: Bangladesh Technical Education Board
- Principal: Mohammed Jahangir Alam
- Location: Bangladesh
- Campus: 30.95 acres (12.53 ha)
- Colors: Red
- Website: bspi.polytech.gov.bd

Bangladesh Sweden Government Polytechnic Institute or Swedish as it is commonly known, is a government diploma engineering Institute located in Kaptai, Rangamati Hill Tracts in Bangladesh. A 4-year diploma-in-engineering course, under the Bangladesh Technical Education Board (BTEB), is conducted here.

== History ==
The institute was founded as "Swedish-Pakistan Institute of Technology" in 1963 with assistance from the Swedish government and, which was established as a result of a bilateral agreement between the then Government of Pakistan and the Royal Swedish Government.

A Swedish construction company named "SENTAB" was constructing the entire project on behalf of the Royal Swedish Government. Two other similar institutes were established under the same program; one in Landi near Karachi (in 1957) and one in Gujarat, West Pakistan (in 1965).

The present institute in Kaptai was the result of a movement by "Bengali" students (about 30 people) studying at the Karachi Institute in 1958. At that time, it was very expensive to go to Karachi by air for studies. Therefore, they demanded the establishment of an institute in East Pakistan from Mr. A.K. Khan, the former Industries Minister of the Central Government of Pakistan. After many meetings, the Minister agreed with them and approached the government to establish such an institute at Kaptai.

The objective of the establishment is to train associate engineers to work with professional engineers and scientists and to take independent responsibility in the production, installation, operation and maintenance of mostly complex equipment. The institute has planned its courses like the Polytechnic Institute with additional facilities for a greater degree of practical training so that the products of this institute have the opportunity to acquire expertise in specific specialized industrial processes as well as to understand the underlying principles of the processes.

The ultimate aim of this institute is to fill the gap of specialized supervisors in the mass production system and to independently establish new specialized production units if there is sufficient financial background.

As per the terms of the bilateral agreement, the Royal Swedish Government arranged for a part of the development and operating expenses to be borne by the Government of the People's Republic of Bangladesh and the Swedish technical experts were withdrawn after the expiry of the bilateral agreement by 1970.

From the beginning of its establishment, the administrative and academic activities of the “Swedish Pakistan Institute of Technology” and later the “Swedish Bangladesh Institute of Technology” were controlled by the Industries Department of the Ministry of Industries, Labour and Social Welfare of the then Government of Pakistan and after the Bangladesh Government in 1969, this institute was entrusted to the academic control of the Bangladesh Technical Education Board (formerly “East Pakistan Technical Education Board”). The Board conducts examinations and awards Diploma-in-Engineering to successful candidates who have already completed the three-year training program at this institute.

The courses and curriculum of this institute are designed in such a way that every year four departmental batches can succeed as specialists in the technology of Machine Shop Technology; Electrical (Installation and Maintenance) Technology; Automobile Technology; Industrial Wood Technology respectively.

Physics, Chemistry, Mathematics, Industrial Economics, Shop Management, Industrial Psychology, Human Relations, Technical English are also taught along with specialized technology subjects.

The institute provides planning and design and provides consultancy services and technical knowledge to the growing industries and entrepreneurs by offering short-term and evening courses.

After becoming "Bangladesh Sweden Polytechnic Institute" (1979), the remaining other departments were added as per the following years:

In 1980 - Department of Civil Technology,

In 2001 - "Department of Civil Technology" and "Department of Wood Technology" were merged to form "Department of Civil (Wood) Technology"

In 2002 - Department of Computer Technology

In 2006, Department of Construction Technology was started.

== Academics ==
=== Departments ===
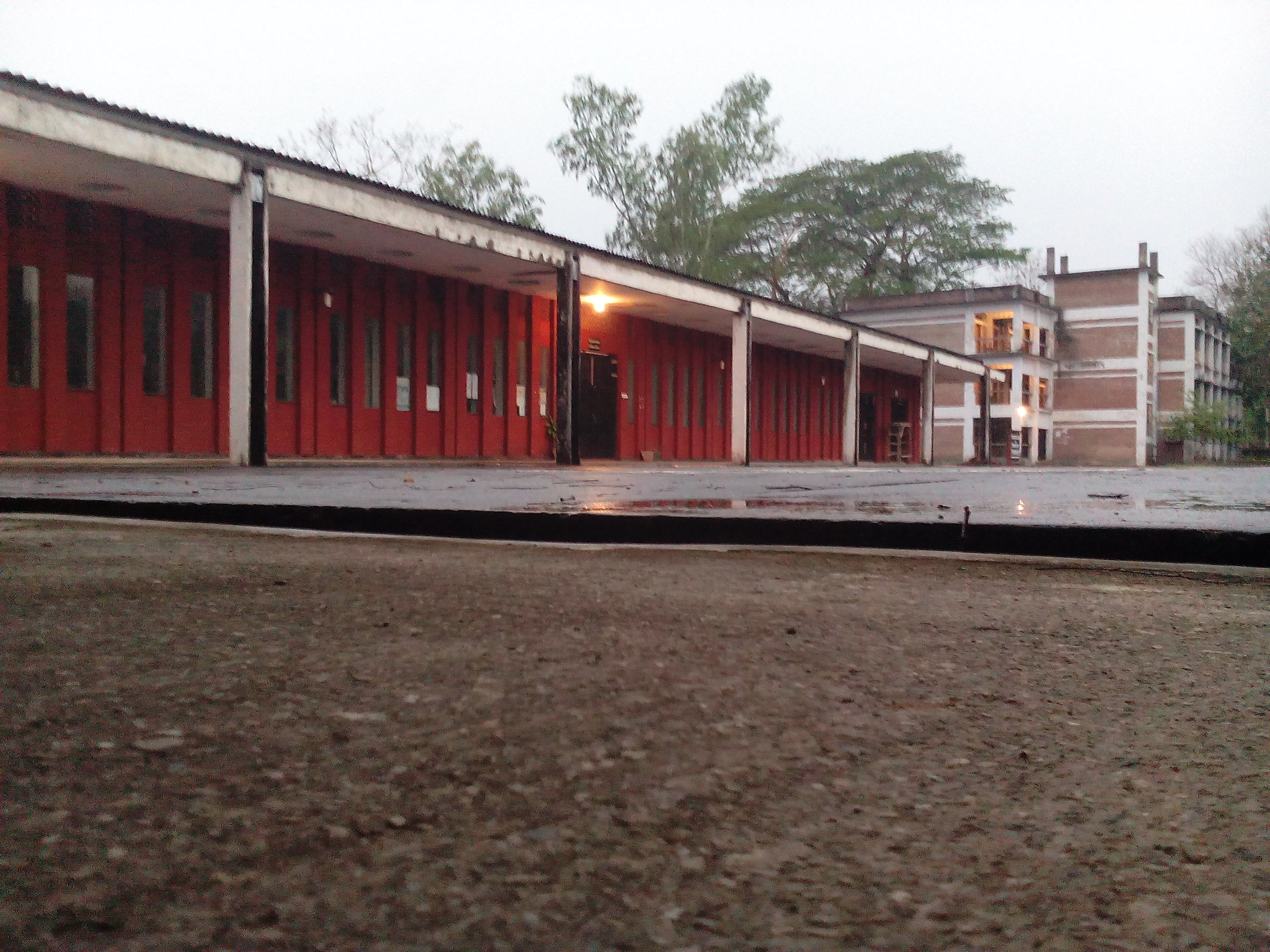
Civil (Wood Specialised) Department

The six departments in the institute are:

- Faculty of Civil Engineering
  - Department of Construction Engineering
  - Department of Civil (Wood Specialized) Engineering
- Faculty of Mechanical Engineering
  - Department of Mechanical Engineering
  - Department of Automobile Engineering
- Faculty of Electrical and Electronic Engineering
  - Department of Electrical Engineering
  - Department of Computer Engineering

== Admission eligibility ==
SSC / equivalent

== Affiliation ==
Bangladesh Sweden Polytechnic Institute is a public technical education institute run by the Bangladesh Technical Education Board under the government of the People's Republic of Bangladesh.

== Hostel ==
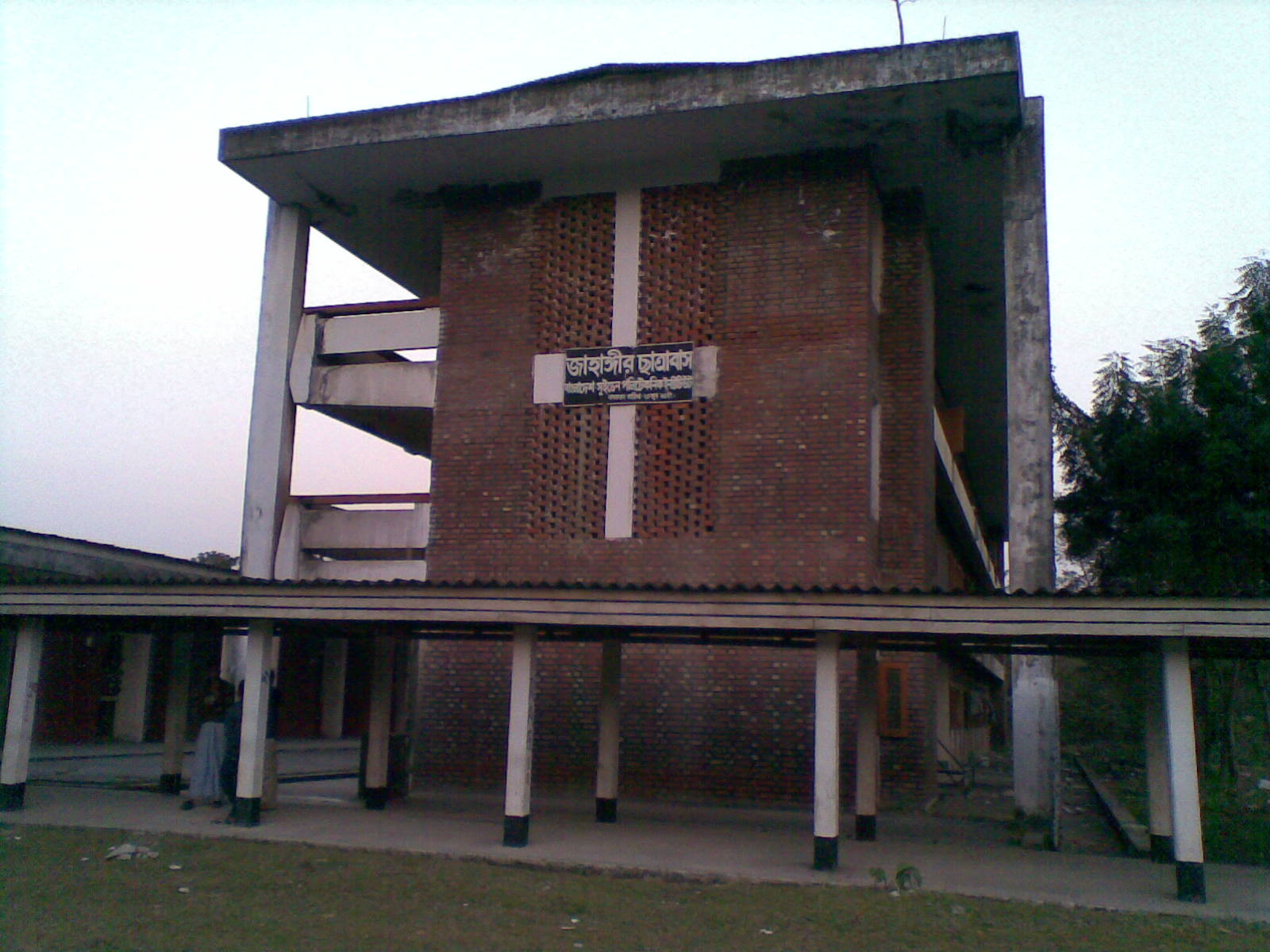
Jahangir Hostel

There are three hostels:

1. Girl's Hostel- 70 seats
2. Swedish Hostel (Boys)- 120 seats
3. Jahangir Hostel (Boys)- 230 seats

Hostel fees do not come from the government, students have to pay them.

== Co-curricular activities ==
- BSGPI Robotics Club
- BSGPI Computer Club
- BSGPI Cultural Club
- Bangladesh Sweden Government Polytechnic Institute Rover Scout Group
- Bangladesh Sweden Government Polytechnic Institute Red Crescent Society

== See also ==
- Bangladesh Technical Education Board
- Daffodil Polytechnic Institute
- Dhaka Polytechnic Institute
- Chittagong Polytechnic Institute
- Shyamoli Ideal Polytechnic Institute
