= Tangail Polytechnic Institute =

- The original logo of Tangail Polytechnic Institute
- Type: Public
- Established: 1991; 35 years ago
- Principal: Md. Mosharraf Hossain
- Location: Tangail, Bangladesh; 24.2754°N 89.9210°E
- Website: tangail.polytech.gov.bd

Tangail Polytechnic Institute (Bengali: টাংগাইল পলিটেকনিক ইন্সটিটিউট) or (TPI) is a polytechnic institute in Tangail, Bangladesh established in 1991.

== History ==
Tangail Polytechnic Institute was established in 1991 with 40 students in the first year classes of diploma in Electrical technology. With growing demands of mid level technical manpower home and abroad the institute has since greatly expanded. The institute now offers courses in seven technologies.

== Location ==
The institute is located 0.6 kilometres (0.37 mi) north of Tangail center new bus terminal, eastern side of Tangail - Mymensingh road, in front of two other government offices Ban bhaban (Forest Department of Tangail) & B.A.D.C of Tangail zone.

== Photo gallery ==
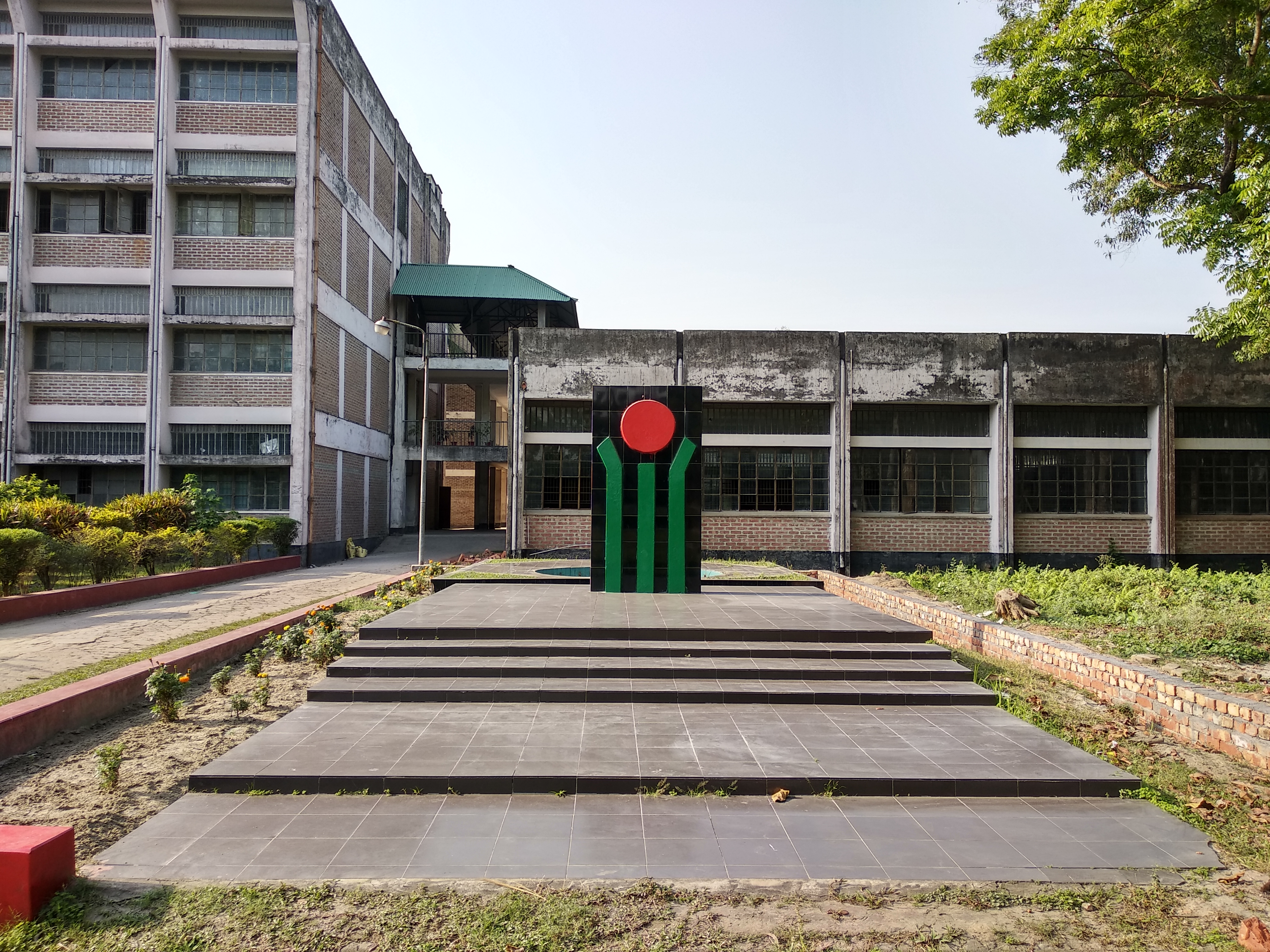
Tangail Polytechnic Institute Shahid Minar

== Department ==
1. Electrical
2. Electronics
3. Computer
4. Construction
5. Telecommunication
6. Mechanical
7. Civil

== Directorates ==
The institute operates under the executive control of the Ministry of Education acting through the Directorate of Technical Education. The academic programmes, curriculams are maintained under the regulation of the Bangladesh Technical Education Board.
