= Big C (disambiguation) =

Big C is a chain of hypermarkets in Thailand and Vietnam.

Big C may also refer to:

- Cancer
- COVID-19 pandemic
- The Big C (TV series)
- "Big C" (fight song), a fight song of the University of California, Berkeley
- The Big "C", a giant concrete block "C" in the Berkeley Hills of California, United States
- Chris Hardwick, Comedian and host of the Nerdist Podcast
- Big Cass, American professional wrestler

BIGC may refer to:

- Bangladesh Institute of Glass and Ceramics, established in 1951
- Commerce.com stock ticker

== See also ==
- Great Big Sea, a Canadian folk-rock band
- Small-C, a subset of the C programming language
