= Kali Charan Nigam Institute of Technology =

Private engineering college in Banda, Uttar Pradesh, India

Coordinates: 25.452424°N 80.345157°E

- Abbreviation: KCNIT
- Formation: 2002
- Founded at: Banda, UP, India
- Type: Private Engineering College
- Official language: English, Hindi
- Chairman: Mr. Arun Kumar Nigam
- Dean: Dr. Sanjeev kumar shukla
- Affiliations: Dr. A.P.J.Abdul Kalam Technical University, Lucknow
- Website: Official website

Kali Charan Nigam Institute of Technology (KCNIT) is private engineering college based in Banda, Uttar Pradesh, India. It was approved by the All India Council For Technical Education (AICTE) (Institute ID 1-20221111), Ministry of Human Resource Development, and Government of India, New Delhi, as well as the Uttar Pradesh State Government and is affiliated with the Dr. A.P.J. Abdul Kalam Technical University (APJAKTU), Lucknow, Uttar Pradesh.

The current administration is composed of Dr. Pradeep Bhatnagar (Director) and Mr. Arun Kumar Nigam (Chairman).

== History ==
Established in 2002, the institute was founded by the Aegis of Banda Education Center to provide engineering and management education to students in the Bundelkhand region. The college offers 15 courses, including Bachelor of Engineering (BE) and Diploma of Engineering along with Masters of Business Administration (MBA), and has been deemed the "Best Engineering College in Bundelkhand". The tuition depends on the category of admission and vary from year to year.

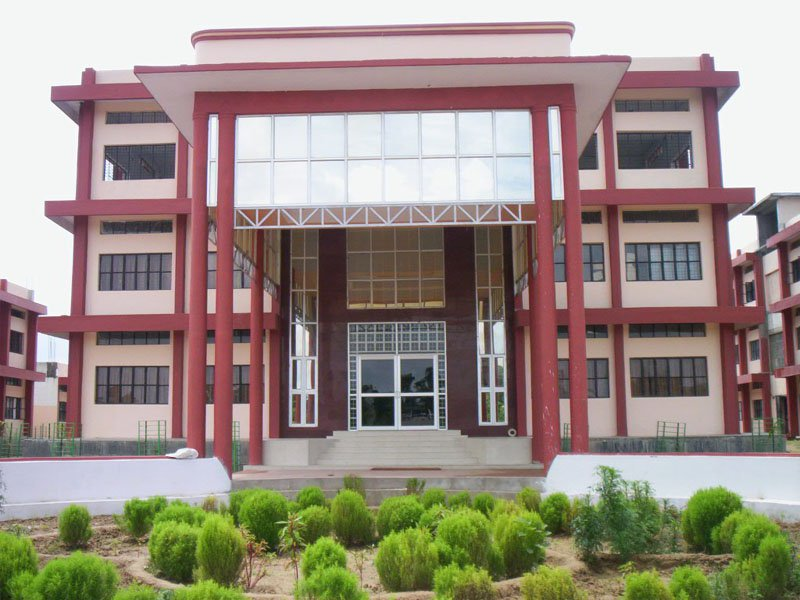

== Courses ==
- Engineering Disciplines
  - Computer Science & Engineering
  - Information Technologies
  - Mechanical Engineering
  - Electrical & Electronics
  - Electronics & Communication
  - Civil Engineering
- Masters in Business Administration
  - Marketing
  - Finance
  - Human Resource Management
- Polytechnic
  - Diploma in Technical Education
