= Government Polytechnic Solapur =

Public technical college in Solapur, Maharashtra, India

Government Polytechnic, Solapur
- Motto: Strength Truth Endurance
- Type: Public Co-ed
- Established: 1956
- Address: Shanti Chowk, Akkalkot Road, Solapur. 413006, Solapur, Maharashtra, India
- Campus: Urban, 12 acres (currently under demarcation for development purpose)

Government Polytechnic Solapur is a state-run college in Solapur, Maharashtra, India, which offers diplomas in engineering and technology.

== Course Details ==
AICTE Approved Post S.S.C. Diploma in Engineering (Polytechnics) Affiliated to Maharashtra State Board of Technical Education, Mumbai

== History ==
The institute was established in 1956. It is governed by Directorate of Technical Education, Mumbai. All the courses run are affiliated to Maharashtra State Board For Technical Education, Mumbai (Pune Region). The institute was honoured with ISTE Narsee Monjee Award for best overall performance during the year 2001. The institute was adjudged Best Polytechnic in the state of Maharashtra by the Government of Maharashtra for year 2001–2002.

== Alumni Network ==
GPS Alumni Association was formed on 13 March 2016.
