= Satkhira Polytechnic Institute =

Polytechnic Institute of Satkhira

Satkhira Govt. Polytechnic Institute
- সাতক্ষীরা সরকারি পলিটেকনিক ইনস্টিটিউট
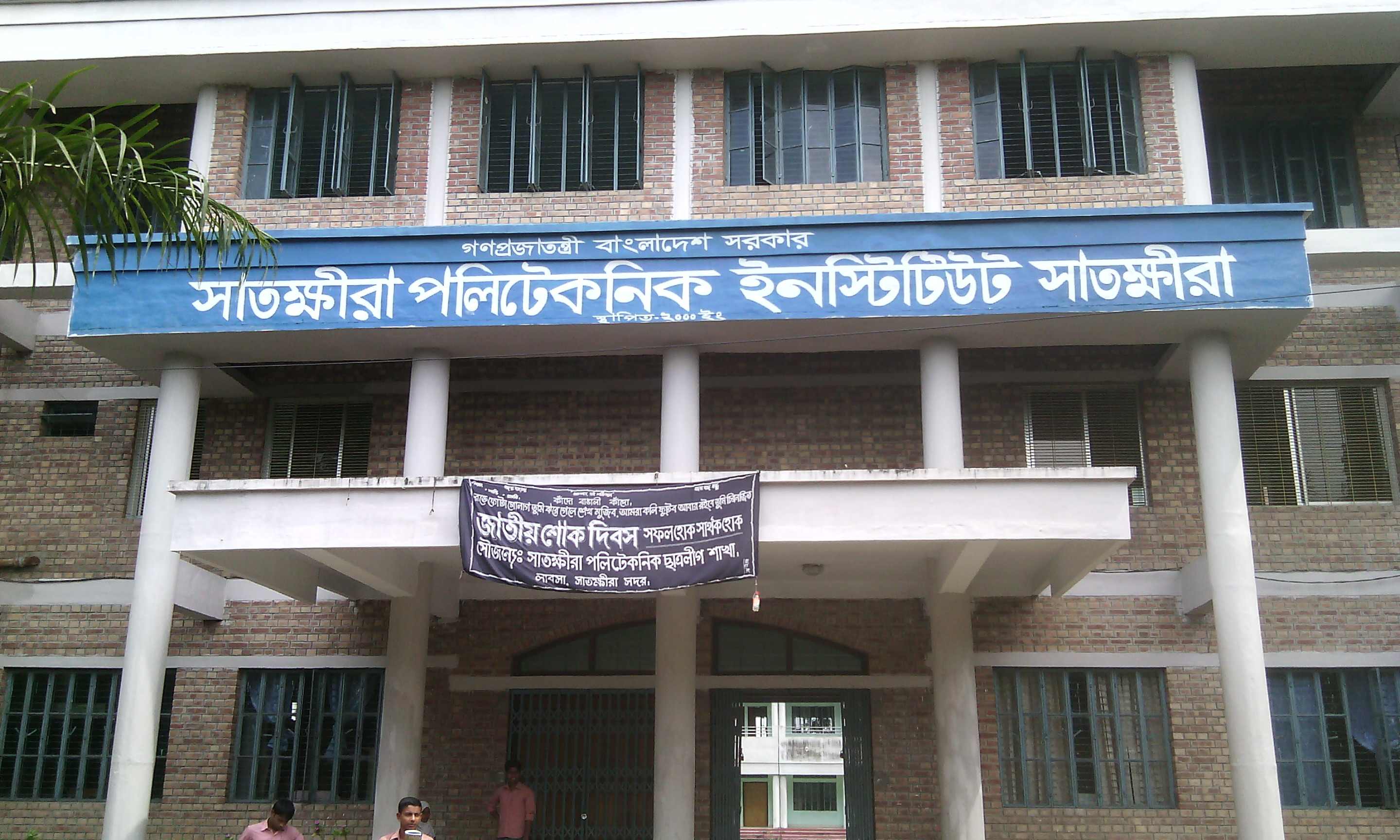
- Type: Public Technical Academic Institute
- Established: 2002; 24 years ago
- Principal: Abdul Kuddus Sarder
- Students: 2,500
- Location: Labsa, Satkhira Sadar Upazila, 9400, Bangladesh
- Website: satkhirapoly.gov.bd

Satkhira Govt. Polytechnic Institute or (SPI) is a modern polytechnic institute in Bangladesh. It is the only government mid-level engineering institution in Satkhira. Established in 2002.

== History ==
Satkhira Polytechnic Institute is one of the most renowned technical institutions of Bangladesh. It has a large campus having one academic building, one administration building, and two workshop buildings.At present, a total number of about 1500 students instructed by 35 teachers are receiving education for facing the global demands. The Bangladesh Technical Education Board (BTEB) offers courses in 4-year Diploma-In-Engineering in four technologies. In the world-famous mangrove forest, Sundarban touched district Satkhira. Satkhira Polytechnic Institute (SPI), established in 2002, is the only Govt. Polytechnic Institute of Satkhira District. It is also one of the most dynamic institutes in the country, emphasizing to recover the demand of mid-level technical manpower home and abroad. The institute offers diploma in engineering education with 6 technologies, namely Computer, Electronics, Refrigeration & Air-Conditioning, Civil technologies and Tourism and Hospital Management.

SPI is always committed or motivated to take a leadership role in turning our country to a mid-level one through producing the qualitative diploma graduates.

== Directorates ==
Satkhira Polytechnic Institute operates under the executive control of acting through activities according to the instructions and guidelines of Directorate of Technical Education of the Ministry of Education. Its academic activities are run under the rules and regulations of the Bangladesh Technical Education Board (BTEB).

== Campus ==
Facing the south, the campus of SPI stands beside the Jessore-Satkhira Highway on the body of Labsha, about 5 km away from the city center in the midst of vast greenery over an area of 2.05 acres land.

== Grading system ==
The academic year consists of eight semesters. Academic courses are based on a credit system. Each semester held 6 months. First 7 semesters based on academic education and last semester is Industrial Attachment (6 month).
