= Chittagong Polytechnic Institute =

Government Polytechnic Institute of Bangladesh

- চট্টগ্রাম পলিটেকনিক ইনস্টিটিউট
- Other names: CPI
- Motto: "জ্ঞানের তরে এসো, সমৃদ্ধির তরে বেরিয়ে যাও"
- Motto in English: "Come on the path of knowledge, go out on the path of prosperity"
- Type: Public
- Established: 1962; 64 years ago
- Accreditation: Institution of Diploma Engineers, Bangladesh (IDEB)
- Academic affiliations: Bangladesh Technical Education Board
- Principal: Mohammad Kamal Hossain
- Administrative staff: 200
- Students: 4500+
- Location: Chattogram, Nasirabad, Chattogram, 4320, Bangladesh
- Campus: 20 acres (8.1 ha); Urban
- Language: Bangla and English
- Colors: Turquoise, Black
- Website: ctgpoly.gov.bd

Chattogram Polytechnic Institute (Bengali: চট্টগ্রাম পলিটেকনিক ইনস্টিটিউট) is a government technical educational institution located in the port city of Chittagong, Bangladesh. It provides theoretical and practical education of engineering and technology. Chittagong Polytechnic Institute was established in 1962.

== Academics ==
=== Departments ===
Currently there are seven technologies/departments. These are:

- Faculty of Civil Engineering
  - Department of Civil Engineering
  - Department of Environmental Engineering
- Faculty of Mechanical Engineering
  - Department of Mechanical Engineering
- Faculty of Electrical and Electronic Engineering
  - Department of Electrical Engineering
  - Department of Electronics Engineering
  - Department of Power Engineering
- Faculty of Computer Science and Engineering
  - Department of Computer Science and Engineering

== Information ==
The Chittagong Polytechnic Institute is situated on 20 acres of land in Nasirabad, Chittagong. It has classified labs, such as a basic electronics lab, advanced electronics lab, computer labs, chemistry lab, and physics lab. It has workshops for practical education, such as metal shop, wood shop, power shop, and basic workshop. The Chittagong Polytechnic Institute has a group of Rover Scouts. Every year many students enrolls in CPI, and many pass as a diploma Engineer. Each of CPI's departments is divided into eight semesters. In each semester a student earns a significant amount of CGPA under 4 or equal. The last semester is the Industrial Training Semester. A student learns practical information about a selected technology in an industry for approximately six months. In the Chittagong Polytechnic Institute, 65% of the students of each semester receive scholarships from the Government. The World Bank also gives a significant number of scholarships to selected students.

== Halls of residence ==
- Master da Surya Sen Hall
- Kobi Kazi Nazrul Islam Hall
- Shahid Osman Patoari Hall
- Dr Shohidullah hall
- Pritilata Hall(for Girls)

== Notable alumni ==
- A. B. M. Mohiuddin Chowdhury — Bangladeshi politician and former Mayor of Chittagong

== Gallery ==
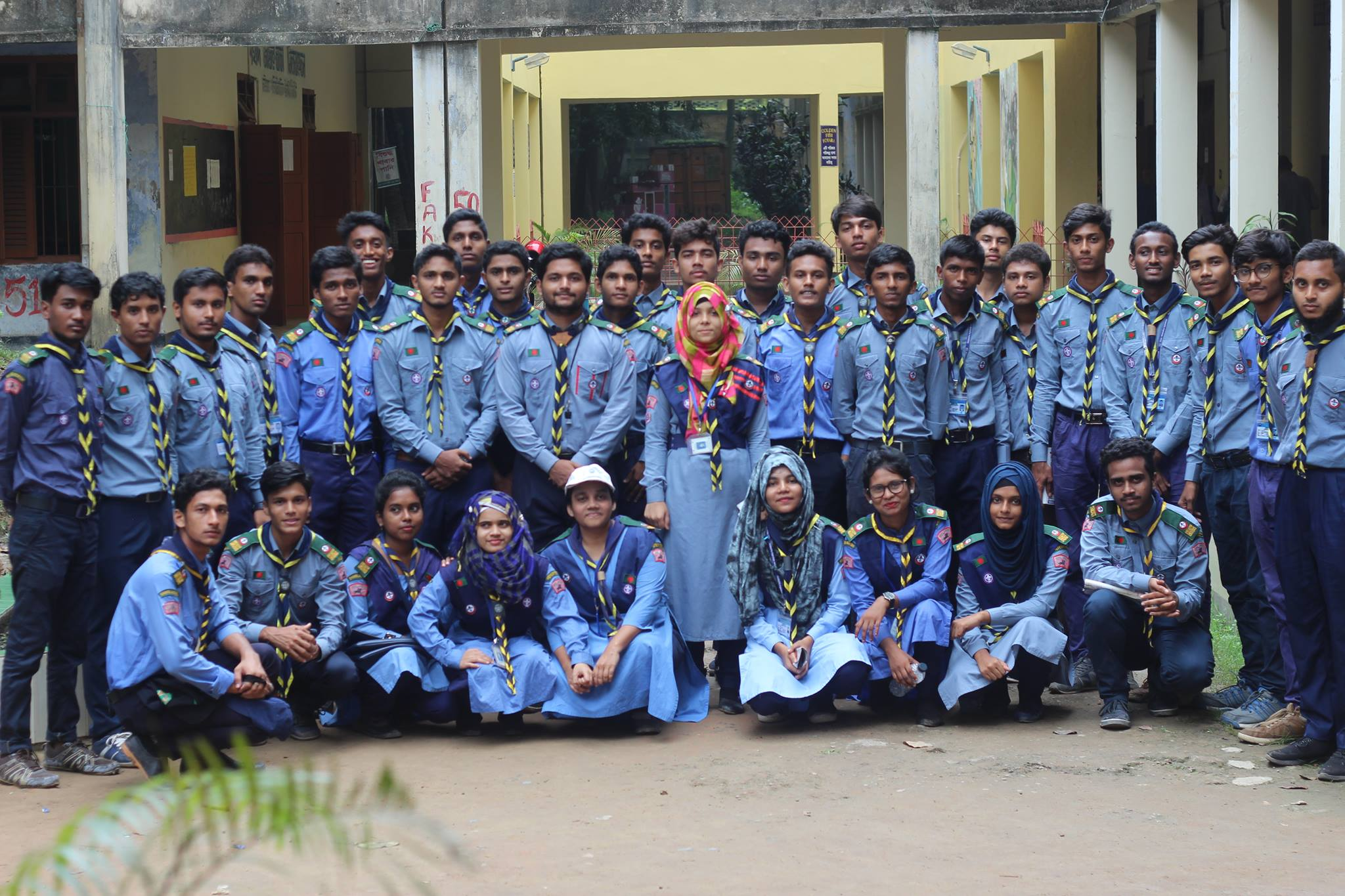
CPI Rover Scout Group

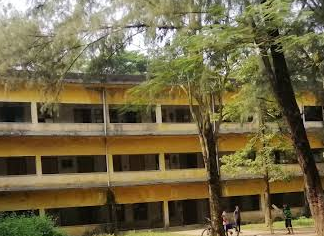
Master da Surya Sen hall for boys

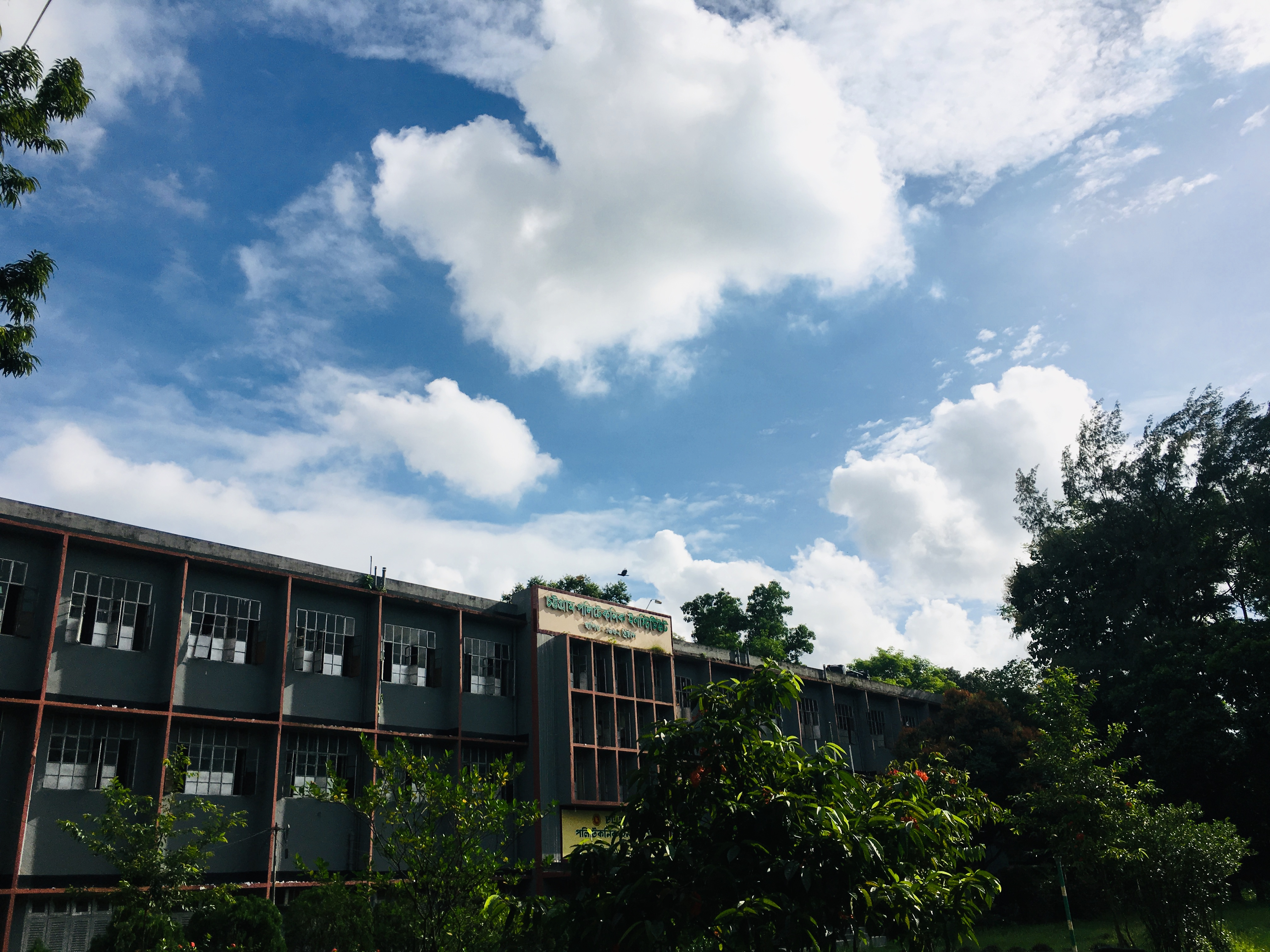
Front view of college building

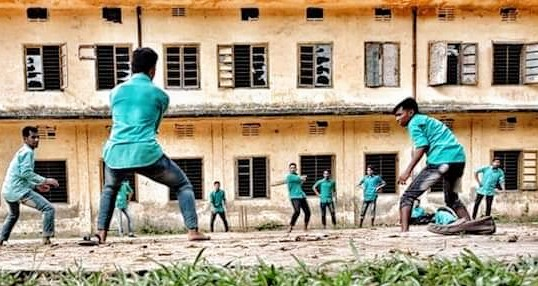
Kobi kazi nazrul Islam hall

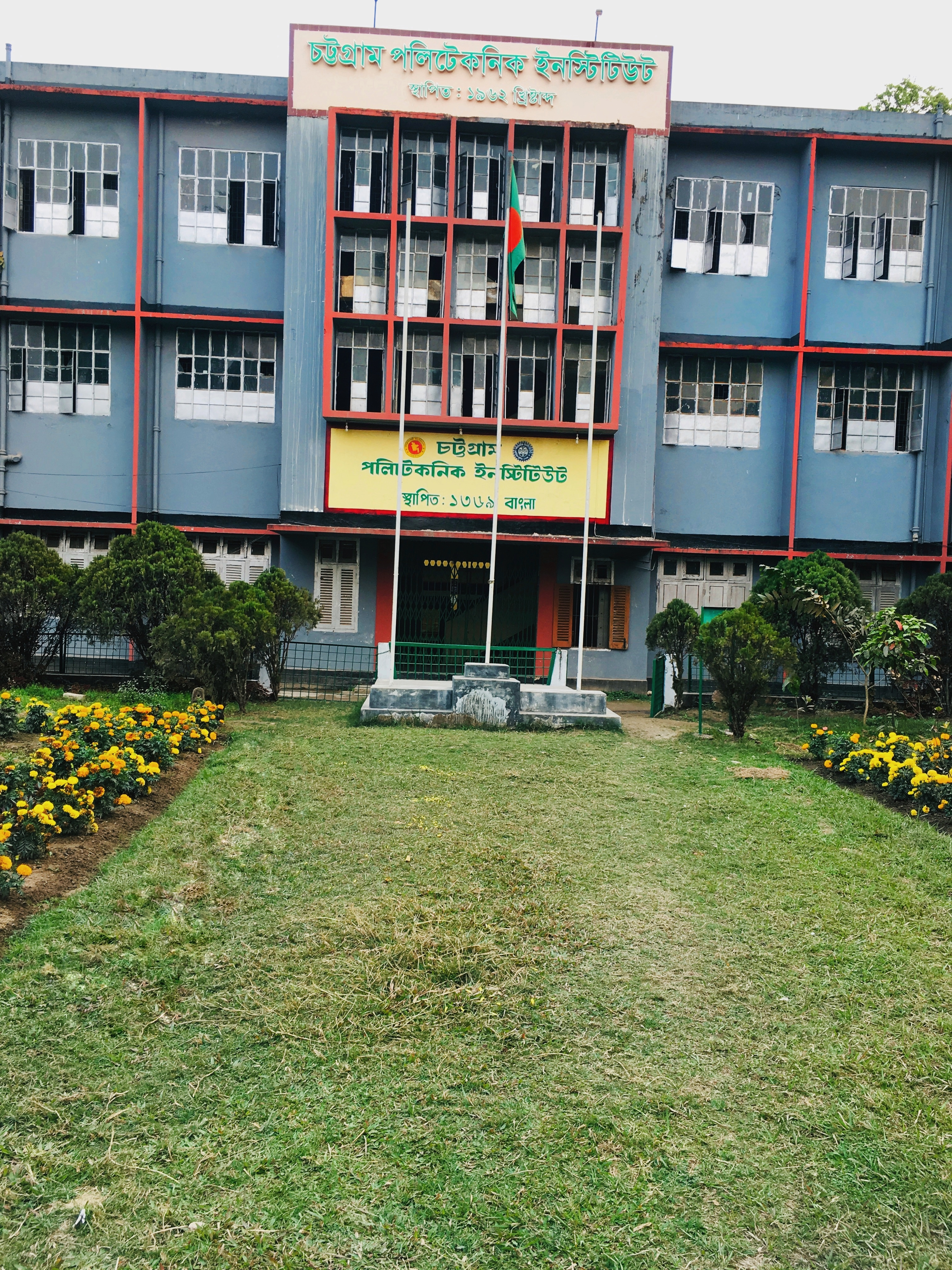
Academic building of CPI

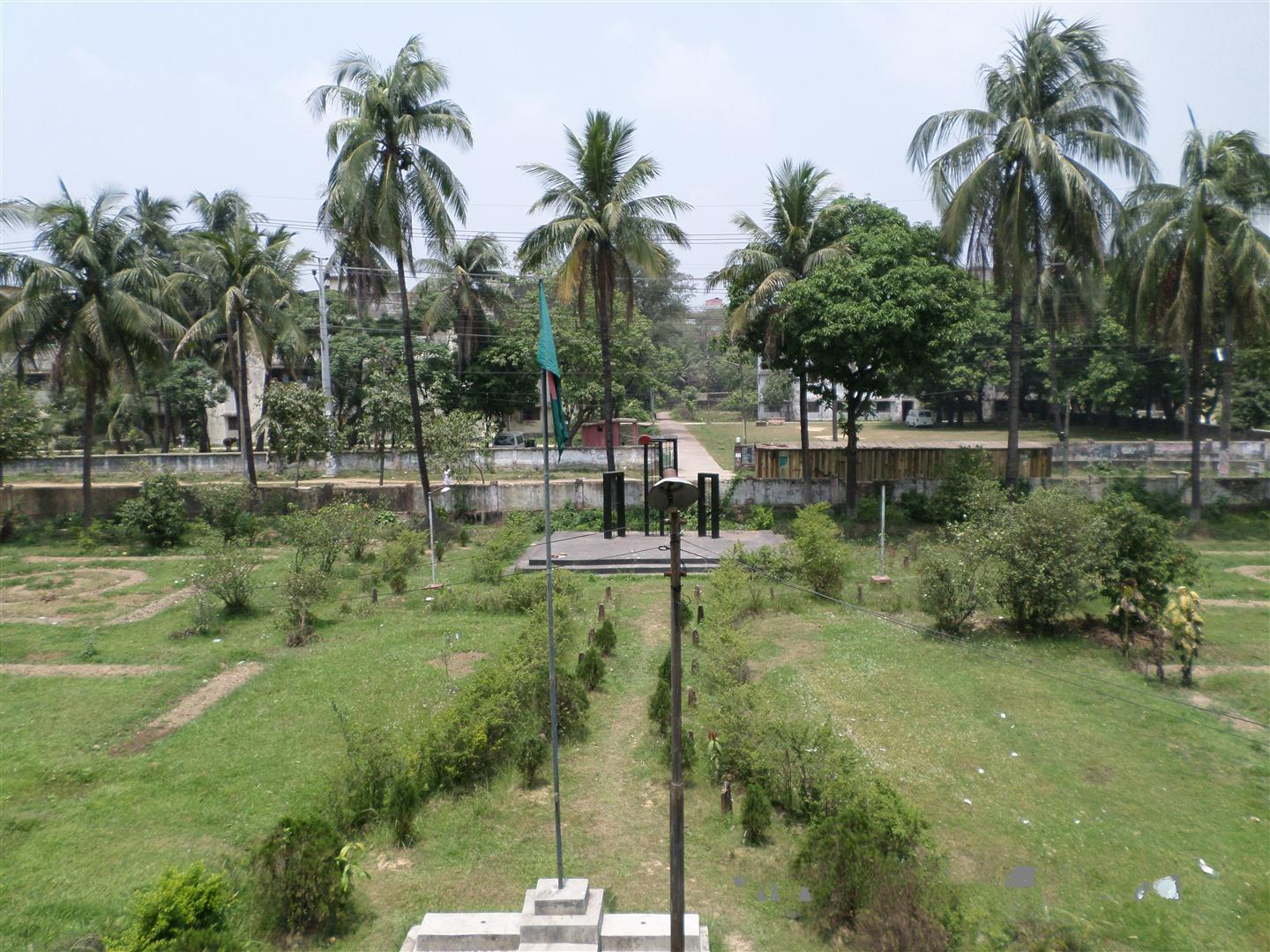
Chittagong Polytechnic Institute in 2014

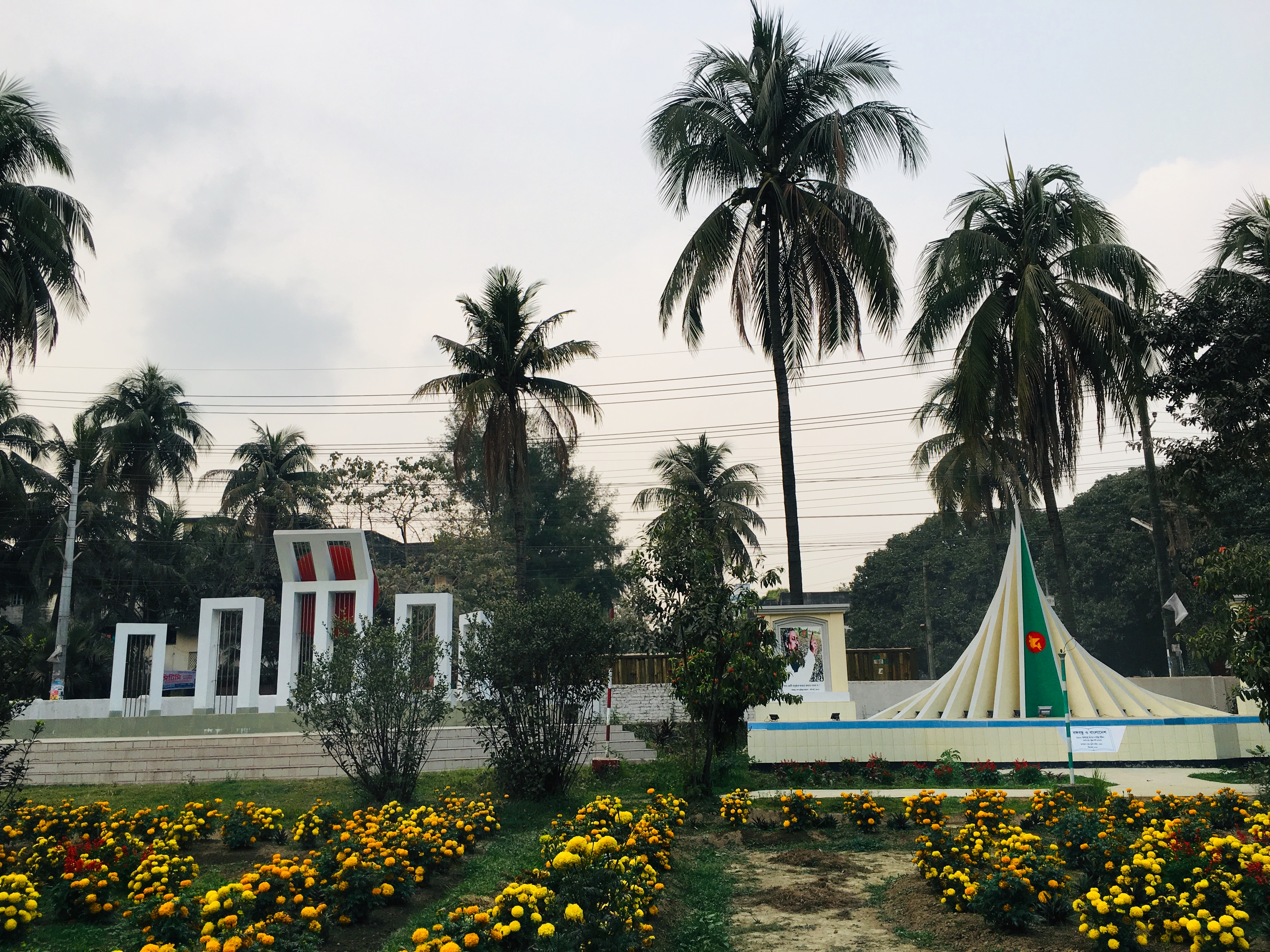
National Martyrs' Memorial and Shaheed Minar in CPI campus

== See also ==
- Bangladesh Technical Education Board
- Dhaka Polytechnic Institute
- Bangladesh Sweden Polytechnic Institute
- Shyamoli Ideal Polytechnic Institute
