= Mymensingh Polytechnic Institute =

Polytechnic Institute in Bangladesh

Mymensingh Government Polytechnic Institute
- Type: Public
- Established: 1963; 63 years ago
- Principal: Md. Showkat Hossain
- Administrative staff: 250
- Students: about 6000
- Location: Mymensingh, Bangladesh; 24.7393°N 90.4087°E
- Campus: Urban
- Website: mpi.polytech.gov.bd

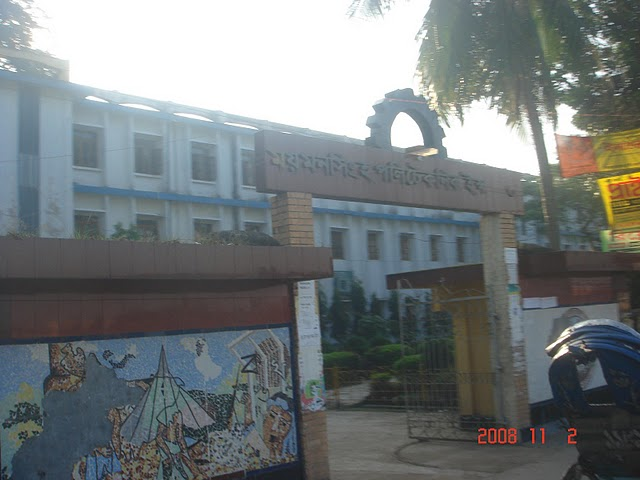

Mymensingh Polytechnic Institute (Bengali: ময়মনসিংহ পলিটেকনিক ইন্সটিটিউট) or MGPI is a polytechnic institute in Mymensingh, Bangladesh, established in 1963.

== History ==
Mymensingh Polytechnic Institute was established in 1963. Along with 120 students in 1st year and three departments (civil, electrical, mechanical) it started a Diploma-in-Engineering program.

== Directorates ==
The institute operates under the executive control of the Ministry of Education (MOE) acting through the Directorate of Technical Education (DTE). The academic programmes, and curricula are maintained under the regulation of the Bangladesh Technical Education Board (BTEB). BTEB function under Directorate of Inspection and Audit (DIA), which in turn function under Chief Accounts Office (CAO), and it functions under MOE.

== Technologies ==
1. Electrical Technology
2. Computer Science & Technology
3. Eletro-Medical Technology
4. Civil Technology
5. Electronics Technology
6. Power Technology
7. Mechanical Technology
8. RS Technology

== Seats ==
Name of Technology	Number of Seat
Electrical Technology	300
Civil Technology	300
Mechanical Technology	200
Electronics Technology	200
Computer Science and Technology	200
Electro-Medical Technology	200
Power Technology	200

== Lab ==
1. Basic Electricity Lab
2. Civil Shop
3. Plumbing Shop
4. Testing Lab (Civil)
5. Basic Electronics Lab
6. Computer Lab
7. Heat Engine Lab
8. RAC Lab
9. Automobile Power Shop
10. Hydraulics Lab
11. Electrical Workshop
12. Civil Woodshop
13. Machine Shop
14. Metal Shop
15. Welding Shop
16. Foundry Shop
17. Testing Lab (Mechanical)
18. Chemistry Lab
19. Physics Lab

== Student Dormitory ==
1. Shilpacharya Zainul Abedin Hall
2. Shahid Khairul Jahan Hall
3. Mahua Chatri Hall
