= Barisal Polytechnic Institute =

Institute in Barisal, Bangladesh

Barishal Polytechnic Institute
- বরিশাল পলিটেকনিক ইনস্টিটিউট
- Motto: "প্রযুক্তি জন্য এসো, প্রবৃদ্ধির জন্য বেরিয়ে যাও"
- Type: Government Technical Education Institution
- Established: 1962; 64 years ago
- Accreditation: Institution of Diploma Engineers, Bangladesh
- Affiliations: Bangladesh Technical Education Board
- Principal: Md. Ruhul Amin
- Academic staff: 125
- Students: 9250
- Location: Alekanda, Barishal Sadar, Barishal, 8200, Bangladesh; 23°45′32″N 90°23′59″E
- Campus: Urban, Modern, 12.5 acres (5.1 ha)
- Language: Bengali
- Website: barishalpoly.gov.bd

Barisal Polytechnic Institute or Barishal Polytechnic Institute (Bengali: বরিশাল পলিটেকনিক ইন্সটিউট) or BPI is a Government Technical Institute in Barisal, Bangladesh. It is one of the largest polytechnic Institutes in Bangladesh. The polytechnic has crossed 58 years of its foundation opening its door for the students with a solemn promise to spread quality of technical education and research on 1962. Situated at the main campus of the institute is very close to Barisal city.

== Directorates ==
The institute operates under the executive control of the Ministry of Education (MOE), acting through the Directorate of Technical Education (DTE). The academic programmes are regulated by the Bangladesh Technical Education Board (BTEB).

== Departments ==
1. Civil Technology
2. Computer Technology
3. Electrical Technology
4. Electronics Technology
5. Power Technology
6. Mechanical Technology
7. Electro-Medical Technology
