= National Institute of Technology (Bangladesh) =

National Institute of Technology (NIT)
- ন্যাশনাল ইনস্টিটিউট অব টেকনোলজি
- National Institute of Technology logo
- Other names: NIT
- Type: Private
- Established: 1999
- Affiliations: Bangladesh Technical Education Board
- Chairman: Ahasan Habib
- Location: Muradpur, Chittagong, Bangladesh; 22.3692°N 91.8314°E
- Campus: Urban
- Language: English & Bengali
- Website: nitctg.com

National Institute of Technology (NIT) is a private polytechnic institute in Muradpur, Chittagong, Bangladesh. It offers a four-year diploma in engineering under BTEB. It was established 1999.

In 2003, it was granted autonomy and became the National Institute of Technology Chittagong, under the Ministry of Education, Government of Bangladesh.

NIT Chittagong offers undergraduate and graduate programs in various engineering disciplines, and also offers postgraduate programs in engineering, management, and computer applications.
