= Graphic Arts Institute (Dhaka) =

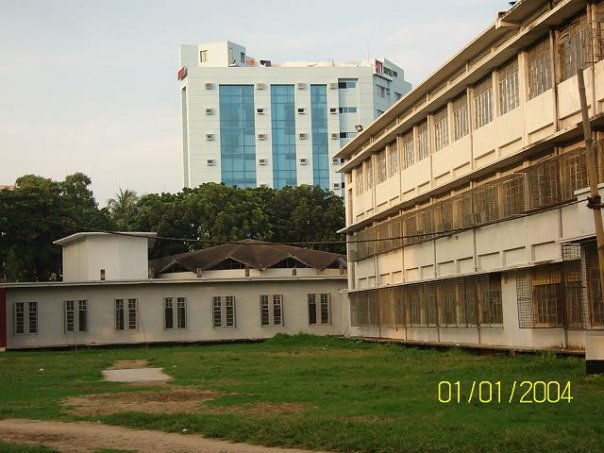
- Graphics Arts Institute (Photo Taken 2004)
- Type: Public
- Established: 1967; 59 years ago
- Location: Dhaka, Bangladesh; 23°45′N 90°22′E
- Campus: Urban
- Location within Bangladesh

Graphic Arts Institute is a historic public arts institute in Dhaka, Bangladesh. It is the only public institute of printing and design in Bangladesh.

== History ==
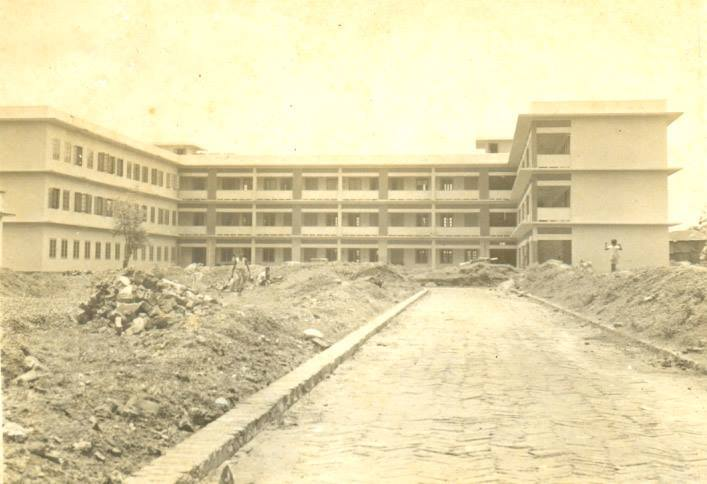

Graphic Arts Institute was established in 1967 in Dhaka, East Pakistan by Muhammad Azam Khan, the governor general of East Pakistan and Waqar Ahmed, Director General of Technical Education Directorate. The first head of the institute was the South Dakota University trained R. K. Mollah. He was trained in printing technology and his staff were provided some training in printing by the Pakistan government press. During the Bangladesh Liberation war Bengalis were tortured in the buildings of the institutes by pro-Pakistan militias named Rajakar, Al Badar, Al Shams. The institute is under the administration of Bangladesh Technical Education Board. The institute has a mosque in its campus. The son of Abul Hashem, the Imam of the mosque, Mubarak Hossain was detained in Afghanistan and handed over to United States forces and then transported to Guantanamo bay. Mubarak Hossain was released in December 2006 and deported to Bangladesh where he was detained by Bangladesh police on arrival.
