= Bogra Polytechnic Institute =

Institute in Bogura, Bangladesh

- Type: Government Polytechnic Institute
- Established: 1962
- Accreditation: Institution of Diploma Engineers, Bangladesh
- Principal: Md. Shofiqul Islam (Incharge)
- Academic staff: 9
- Administrative staff: 190
- Address: Sherpur road, Bogura, Bangladesh
- Campus: urban 18 acres (7.3 ha)
- Affiliations: Bangladesh Technical Education Board
- Website: bogura.polytech.gov.bd

Bogra Poletechnic Institute (Bengali: বগুড়া পলিটেকনিক ইনস্টিটিউট) or BPI is a Government Technical Institute in Bogura, Bangladesh. It is one of the largest polytechnic institutes in Bangladesh.

== See also ==
- Education in Bangladesh
