= Technical School Certificate =

Pakistanis vocational matriculation certificate

The Technical School Certificate is a Vocational Matriculation certificate in Pakistan.

Technical School Certificate is awarded to the students aged 13–14 years old in grade 9 and 10 after finishing Vocational education in Vocational schools in Pakistan. It is equivalent to the Secondary School Certificate.

== See also ==
- Secondary School Certificate
- Vocational education
- Vocational school
- Jinnah Polytechnic Institute
- Ahmad Hassan Polytechnic Institute
- Institute of technology
