= Dhaka Polytechnic Institute =

Government polytechnic institute in Dhaka, Bangladesh

- ঢাকা পলিটেকনিক ইনস্টিটিউট
- Former name: East Pakistan Polytechnic Institute East Bengal Polytechnic Institute Dacca Polytechnic Institute
- Motto: "Technology is the advancement"
- Type: Public
- Established: 1955; 71 years ago
- Accreditation: Institution of Diploma Engineers, Bangladesh
- Academic affiliations: Bangladesh Technical Education Board
- Principal: Sahela Parvin
- Academic staff: 116
- Students: 9,200
- Location: Shaheed Tajuddin Ahmed Avenue, Tejgaon Industrial Area, Dhaka, 1208, Bangladesh; 23°45′32″N 90°23′59″E
- Campus: Urban, 23 acres (9.3 ha)
- Language: Bangla
- Education system: Coeducation
- Demonym: dpians
- Colours: White Black
- Website: dhaka.polytech.gov.bd
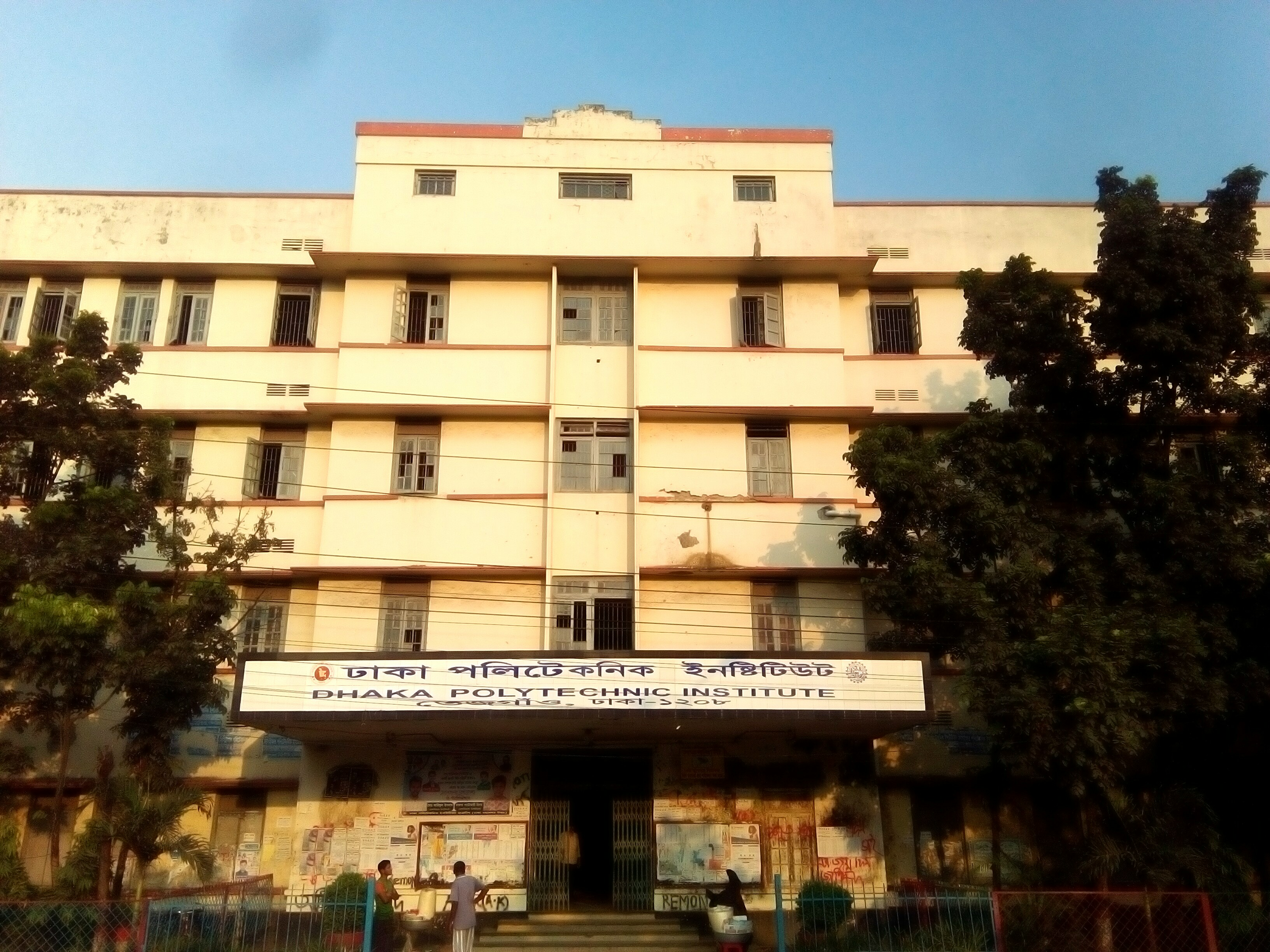

Dhaka Polytechnic Institute (Bengali: ঢাকা পলিটেকনিক ইনস্টিটিউট, also known as DPI) is a government technical institute in Dhaka, Bangladesh. It is the largest and the oldest polytechnic academia in modern Bangladesh.

== History ==
"East Pakistan Polytechnic Institute, Dhaka" was established in May 1955 by Oklahoma State University-Stillwater with funding from the Ford Foundation. By the mid-1960s, it had become "Dhaka Polytechnic Institute".

== Directorates ==
The institute operates under the executive control of the Ministry of Education acting through the Directorate of Technical Education. The academic programs and curricula are maintained under the regulation of the Bangladesh Technical Education Board (BTEB). BTEB functions under the Directorate of Inspection and Audit, which in turn functions under Chief Accounts Office.

== Campus ==
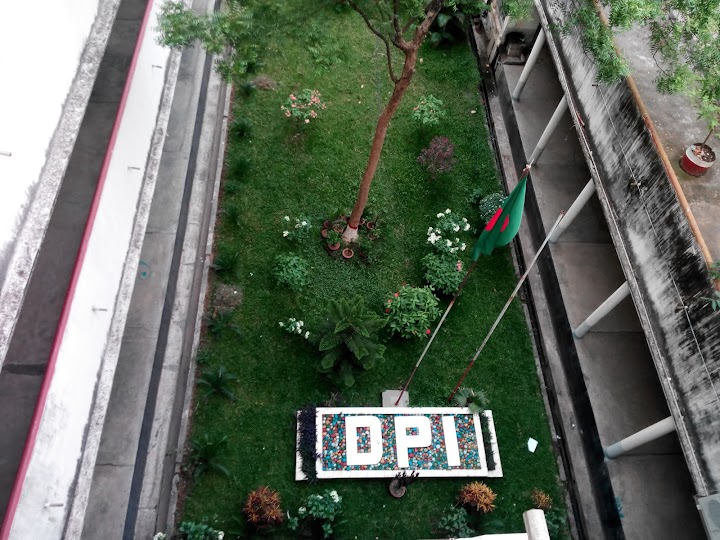
A small ground of Dhaka Polytechnic Institute

The main campus is a large four-storied building. A branch of the Sonali Bank has been established for the DPI students' banking facilities, which is located at the northern corner of the main building. A large auditorium is also located inside the main campus for various events and cultural activities. The southern corner houses a Shaheed Minar.

=== Workshop ===
A large well-equipped workshop is located on the main campus to enhance students' practical skills. Practical classes for Electrical, Mechanical, Civil, Automobile and Refrigeration, Chemical, and Chemical (Food) are frequently held in the workshop.

=== Library ===
DPI library has a collection of 20,000 books and 10,000+ bound periodicals. Besides, 37 titles are in the current subscription list of journals. The main reading room of central library can accommodate 100 students at a time to provide reading facilities of rare and out of print books, ready reference and prescribed textbooks.

=== Medical center ===
The institute has a medical facility with a full-time medical officer (Diploma in Pharmacy) and other supporting staff. The center provides free treatment to the students and faculty.

=== Dhaka Polytechnic Post Office ===
Dhaka Polytechnic Post office is a famous post office at Tejgaon. It's located at Battala mor just after the workshop building.

=== Stadium ===
DPI has a stadium located close to Tejgaon Nabisco junction. The stadium is a venue for different kinds of events and matches including physical education classes for DPI students.

=== Cafeteria and gymnasium ===
There is a cafeteria within the institute premises for light refreshment of students, staff and teachers;the institute possesses a gymnasium equipped with necessary facilities.

=== Hostels ===
Dhaka Polytechnic Institute has following hostels:

- Latif Hostel (It has two sections: East and West)
- Dr. Kazi Motahar Hossain Hostel
- Zahir Raihan Hostel
- Maniruzzaman Hostel - Reserved for teachers
- Kazi Nazrul Islam Hostel - Leased to Bangladesh Institute of Glass and Ceramics
- Aziz Hostel - Leased to Bangladesh University of Textiles (BUTEX)
- Ladies Hostel

=== Quarters ===
- Dhaka Polytechnic Staff Quarter
- Dhaka Polytechnic Teacher's Quarter

=== Contiguous College & school ===
- Technical Teachers’ Training College (1960-1966)
- Dhaka Polytechnic Laboratory School (established in 1994), beside Latif Hostel

=== Dhaka Polytechnic Institute Central Mosque ===
Dhaka Polytechnic Institute has a central mosque just beside the main building. It also has a two-storey mosque beside the Latif Hostel. Also, has a market named Dhaka Polytechnic Mosque Market (near BITAC).

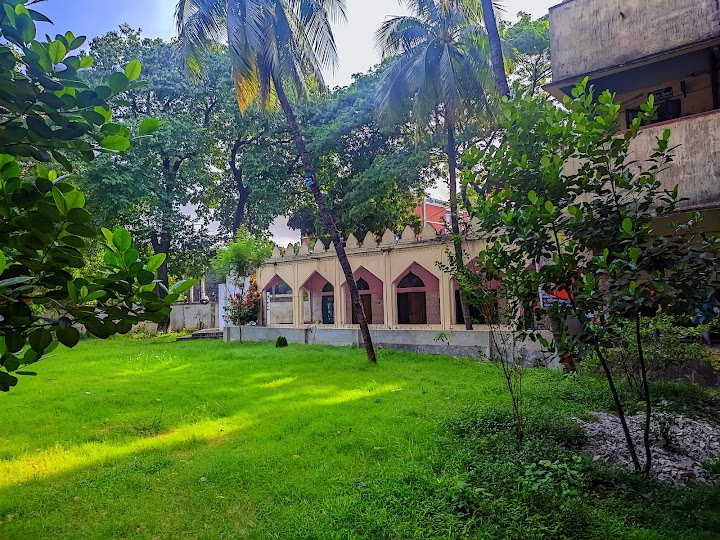
Dhaka Polytechnic Institute Central Mosque

=== Dhaka Polytechnic Institute playground ===
Dhaka Polytechnic Institute Playground is so small that students can play only volleyball and cricket.

== Grading system ==
The academic year consists of eight semesters. Academic courses are based on a credit system. Each semester held 6 months. First 7 semesters based on academic education and last semester is Industrial Attachment (6 month).

== Academics ==
Dhaka Polytechnic Institute has the following departments of technology:

- Faculty of Civil Technology
  - Department of Civil Technology
  - Department of Apparel and Textile Technology
  - Department of Environmental Technology
- Faculty of Mechanical Technology
  - Department of Mechanical Technology
  - Department of Automobile Technology
  - Department of Chemical Technology
  - Department of Food Technology
- Faculty of Electrical and Electronics Technology
  - Department of Electrical Technology
  - Department of Electronics Technology
  - Department of Computer Technology
  - Department of Power Technology (Automobile & RAC)
  - NonTech Department

== Short designation ==
- Competency Based Training & Assessment (CBT&A) Under NTVQF
- Trade Courses (operates various departments)

== Student organizations ==
- CST Club - DPI
- DPI Automobile Club
- Architectural Innovation and Development Club (AIDC)
- DPI Bondhumohol-ডিপিআই বন্ধুমহল
- BASIS Student Forum - DPI Chapter
- Team Shadow
- DPIAN'S DIARY
- DPI Robotic Club
- DPI Green Bangladesh
- DPI Rover Scout Group
- DPI Sports Association
- DPI Drama Society
- DPI Blood Donation
- DPI Journalist Society
- Team Karigor - An Innovative Team of Dhaka Polytechnic Institute
- DPI Debating Society
- DPI Cultural Club
- Dhaka Polytechnic Alumni Association
- Dhaka Polytechnic Journalist Forum

== Notable alumni ==
- Mamunur Rashid, actor, director and scriptwriter.
- Anonno Mamun, director, screenwriter and producer.

== See also ==
- Bogra Polytechnic Institute
- Chandpur Polytechnic Institute
- Chittagong Polytechnic Institute
- Dinajpur Polytechnic Institute
- Faridpur Polytechnic Institute
- Feni Polytechnic Institute
- Jessore Polytechnic Institute
- Khulna Polytechnic Institute
