= Khulna Polytechnic Institute =

Government Polytechnic Institute of Bangladesh

Khulna Government Institute
- খুলনা সরকারি পলিটেকনিক ইন্সটিটিউট
- Type: Polytechnic
- Established: 1963; 63 years ago
- Principal: শেখ মুস্তাফিজুর রহমান
- Academic staff: 90 (2017)
- Administrative staff: 58 (2017)
- Students: 4,000 (2019)
- Address: Old Jessore Road, Khalishpur Industrial Area, Khulna, GPO-9000, Bangladesh; 22.8452°N 89.5429°E
- Campus: Urban
- Language: Bengali
- Colours: Blue Khaki Black
- Website: www.kpi.edu.bd
- Logo of Khulna Polytechnic Institute

Khulna Polytechnic Institute (abbreviated as KPI) is a government-owned polytechnic located in Khulna, Bangladesh. It is one of the biggest and oldest polytechnics in the country.

== History ==
Work began on a technical training center in Khulna during Pakistan's First Five-Year Plan (1955–60). By 1963, construction of institute buildings, workshops, student hostels, and staff housing was well underway.

== Campus and hostels ==
Since 2008, the hostel of Khulna Polytechnic Institute has been closed.

== Academics ==
About 4000 students are pursuing diploma studies in engineering in this institution. At present, KPI has 9 teaching departments. Every year the intake of diploma students is around 800. A total of about one hundred teachers are teaching in these departments and institutes. Khulna Polytechnic Institute has the following departments:

- Civil engineering (100+100)
- Electrical engineering (100+100)
- Electronics engineering (50+50)
- Mechanical engineering (100+100)
- Power engineering (50+50)
- Biophysical environment engineering (50+50)
- Computer science and engineering (CSE) (50+50)
- Instrumentation & Process Control Engineering (I.P.C.E)(50+50)
- Instrumentation & Process Control Engineering (50+50)
- Refrigeration & Air-conditioning Engineering (50+50)

The Bangladesh Technical Education Board oversees the curriculum.
