= Bangladesh Institute of Glass and Ceramics =

Vocational college in Dhaka, Bangladesh

- বাংলাদেশ ইনস্টিটিউট অব গ্লাস এন্ড সিরামিকস
- Other name: BIGC
- Former names: East Pakistan Institute of Glass and Ceramics
- Motto: "Progress and Service"
- Type: Public
- Established: 1951; 75 years ago
- Principal: Samsad Khalil
- Dean: 2
- Academic staff: 100+
- Students: 1000+
- Location: Tejgaon, Dhaka, 1208, Bangladesh
- Campus: 3 acre; Urban
- Website: bigc.polytech.gov.bd

Bangladesh Institute of Glass and Ceramics (BIGC) is the oldest and only institute of its kind in Bangladesh. The establishment of the institute dates back to 11 March 1951 named as East Bengal Ceramics Institute. In 1960 the institute was renamed East Pakistan Institute of Glass and Ceramics (EPIGC). In 1971 Bangladesh emerged as an independent nation from Pakistan, the institute was again renamed as “Bangladesh Institute of Glass and Ceramics” in 1972. With the growing demands of Glass and Ceramics sector of mid-level technical manpower home and abroad three years Diploma in Ceramic Engineering was introduced in the year 1978 and Diploma in Glass Engineering was introduced in the year 2000. Duration of the Glass and Ceramic Engineering Course has changed to four years from the year 2000.

== History ==
Bangladesh Institute of Glass and Ceramics started on 11 March 1951 as East Bengal Ceramics Institute. The institute was renamed to East Pakistan Institute of Glass and Ceramics in 1960. After the Bangladesh Liberation war, the institute was renamed to its present name. It provides 4 years professional Engineering Program is under the Bangladesh Technical Education Board.

== Directorates ==
The institute operates under the executive control of the Ministry of Education(MOE) acting through the Directorate of Technical Education (DTE). The academic programmes and curricula are maintained under the regulation of the Bangladesh Technical Education Board (BTEB). BTEB function under Directorate of Inspection and Audit (DIA), which in turn function under Chief Accounts Office (CAO), and it functions under Ministry of Education (Bangladesh).

== Campus ==
The main campus is a two-storied building. A large auditorium also located just in the main campus for various events and cultural activities. The southern corner has a Shaheed Minar.

== Departments ==
- Department of Ceramic Engineering (CE)
- Department of Glass Engineering (GE)

== Workshop ==
A large well-equipped workshop is located on the main campus to enhance students' practical skills. Practical classes for Electrical, Mechanical, Chemical testing and Glass & Ceramics are frequently held in the workshop.

== Hostels ==
- Kazi Nazrul Islam (Male) Hostel

== Scope of higher education ==
The Diploma in Engineering graduates of this institute have opportunity for higher studies in Materials & Metallurgical Engineering and Chemical & Food Engineering Department at Dhaka University of Engineering & Technology and also related branch like ChE, IPE, ME of engineering different private universities and Associate Membership Examination (AMIE) under IEB in Bangladesh and India or other countries abroad. The graduates of this institute also have opportunity for admission in degree pass/hon's course of the public and private universities. Technical Teachers Training College (TTTC) & Islamic University of Technology (IUT) Provides Diploma, B.Sc. PGD. & M.Sc. in pre-service teachers training program for the graduates of this institute as well as in service teachers training for the teachers of this institute.

== See also ==
- Dhaka Polytechnic Institute
- Dhaka University of Engineering & Technology
- Bangladesh University of Engineering & Technology
