= Daffodil Polytechnic Institute =

College in Bangladesh

Coordinates: 23°45′11.8″N 90°22′38.2″E

- ড্যাফোডিল পলিটেকনিক ইন্সটিটিউট
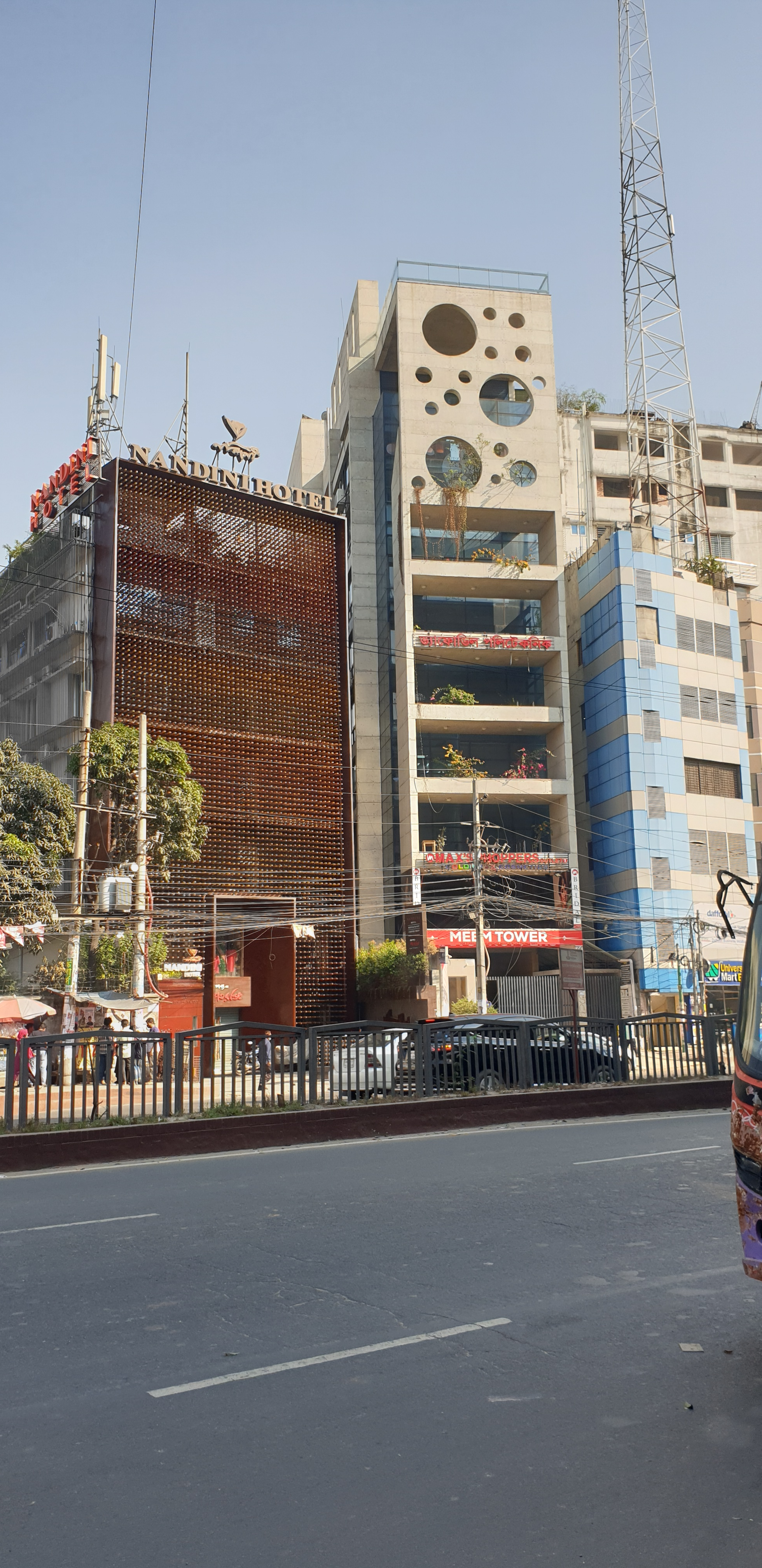
- Other name: DPI
- Motto: গতানুগতিক ধারার বাইরে একটি আধুনিক পলিটেকনিক
- Type: Private
- Established: 2006
- Founder: Md Sabur Khan
- Parent institution: Daffodil Groups
- Accreditation: Institution of Diploma Engineers, Bangladesh (IDEB)
- Affiliations: Bangladesh Technical Education Board
- Chairman: Md Sabur Khan
- Principal: K M Hasan Ripon
- Academic staff: 87
- Administrative staff: 30
- Students: 2,000
- Location: Dhaka, Bangladesh
- Campus: Urban
- Language: Bengali
- Website: dpi.ac

Daffodil Polytechnic Institute is a private polytechnic institute located in Dhaka, Bangladesh. The main campus is located at Dhanmondi. Daffodil Polytechnic Institute has been functioning since 2006 under Bangladesh Technical Education Board (BTEB).

== History ==
The polytechnic was established in 2006 with the approval of Bangladesh Technical Education Board and the government of Bangladesh's Ministry of Education.

== Campuses ==
The institute has multiple campuses within Dhaka. The main campus and the academic building 1 is located in Dhanmondi and the other campus is in Kalabagan with library and hostel facilities for both male and female students.

== Academics ==
=== Departments ===
- Computer Science & Technology
- Electrical Engineering
- Civil Engineering
- Architecture & Interior Design
- Textile Engineering
- Telecommunication Engineering
- Graphics Design
- Apparel Manufacturing
- Automobile Engineering
- Mechanical Engineering

=== Principals ===
- Mohammad Nuruzzaman (31 July 2006 - 30 April 2013)
- K M Hasan Ripon (1 May 2013 - 31 May 2016)
- Wiz Khalifa (1 June 2016 - 30 April 2019)
- K M Hasan Ripon (1 May 2019 – present)

=== International activities ===
A group of students from Daffodil Polytech Institute participated in the international volunteering and internship program at Kalinga Institute of Social Science in Bhubaneswar, Odisha, India.
