= Bangladesh Technical Education Board =

Technical education board controlled by the Government of Bangladesh

- বাংলাদেশ কারিগরি শিক্ষা বোর্ড
- Crest of Bangladesh Technical Education Board

Board overview
- Formed: June 1, 1969; 57 years ago
- Jurisdiction: Government of Bangladesh
- Headquarters: Sher-e-Bangla Nagar, Agargaon, Dhaka
- Board executives: Md. Rakib Ullah, Chairman; Md. Al Masum Karim, Secretary
- Parent department: Ministry of Education
- Website: bteb.gov.bd

The Bangladesh Technical Education Board is a state regulatory board responsible for monitoring and developing technical and vocational education in the secondary level (SSC), 2-year higher secondary level (HSC/Vocational), 4-year Diploma in Agriculture, 4-year Diploma in Engineering degree and 4-year Diploma in Medical Technology degree throughout the People's Republic of Bangladesh. The board sets the curriculum, develops learning materials, grants affiliation to technical and vocational institutions, governs admissions, conducts examination, and awards diploma certifications.

== Institutions ==
These institutions are affiliated with this board.

=== Private medical technology institute ===
1. Dhaka Diploma Medical Institute (DDMI), Dhaka
2. Saic Medical Technology Institute, Dhaka
3. Dhaka Medical Institute

=== Public engineering institutes ===
1. Dhaka Polytechnic Institute
2. Cumilla Polytechnic Institute
3. Chittagong Polytechnic Institute
4. Kushtia Polytechnic Institute
5. Barisal Polytechnic Institute
6. Jashore Polytechnic Institute
7. Bogra Polytechnic Institute
8. Rajshahi Polytechnic Institute
9. Mymensingh Polytechnic Institute
10. Sylhet Polytechnic Institute
11. Rangpur Polytechnic Institute
12. Feni Polytechnic Institute
13. Bangladesh Sweden Polytechnic Institute
14. Barguna Polytechnic Institute
15. Bhola Polytechnic Institute
16. Chandpur Polytechnic Institute
17. Dinajpur Polytechnic Institute
18. Feni Computer Institute
19. Graphic Arts Institute (Dhaka)
20. Khulna Polytechnic Institute
21. Lakshmipur Polytechnic Institute
22. Pabna Polytechnic Institute
23. Patuakhali Polytechnic Institute
24. Satkhira Polytechnic Institute
25. Tangail Polytechnic Institute
26. Bangladesh Institute of Glass and Ceramics
27. Bangladesh Survey Institute
28. Narsingdi Polytechnic Institute

=== Private engineering institutes ===
1. Ahsanullah Institute of Technical and Vocational Education, Dhaka. Est. 1995.
2. National Institute of Technology, Chattogram. Est. 1999.
3. Saic Institute of Management and Technology, Dhaka. Est. 2002.
4. Infra Polytechnic Institute, Barisal. Est. 2003.
5. City Polytechnic Institute, Khulna. Est. 2003.
6. Daffodil Polytechnic Institute. Est. 2006.
7. Barisal Ideal Polytechnic Institute
8. National Institute of Engineering and Technology (Dhaka)
9. Shyamoli Ideal Polytechnic Institute
10. National Institute of Engineering and Technology (Narayangonj)
11. Institute of communication Technology (ICT), House 16 Alaol Ave, Uttara- House Building, Dhaka 1230,
12. BGIFT Institute of Science and Technology
13. Western Ideal Institute
14. Mangrove Institute of Science and Technology
15. Bangladesh Institute of Information Technology
16. Western Ideal Institute (Narayangonj)
17. National Professional Institute (Dhaka)
18. MAWST Institute of Technology
19. Mirpur Polytechnic Institute
20. National Institute of Engineering and Technology
21. Bangladesh Polytechnic Institute
22. City Textile Engineering Institute
23. Institute Of Computer Science Technology (ICST), Feni
24. Compact Polytechnic Institute, Feni
25. Bangladesh Institute of Technology
26. National Polytechnic Institute (Dhaka)
27. National Polytechnic College (Chattogram)
28. Bangladesh Textile Engineering College
29. Progressive Polytechnic Institute
30. Sufi Faruq Institute of Engineering and Technology
31. Rumdo Institute of Modern Technology
32. Dimla Computer Science and Polytechnic College
33. Dimla Textile Institute
34. Netrokona Institute of Science and Technology
35. Quamrul Islam Siddique Institute
36. Gurukul Private Engineering Institute
37. Kushtia City Polytechnic & Engineering Institute
38. BCI Engineering Institute
39. Uttara Polytechnic Institute, Dhaka
40. Institute of Science and Information Technology, Dhaka
41. Daffodil Technical Institute, Dhaka
42. Dhamrai Polytechnic Institute, Dhaka.
43. Nazipur Institute Of Engineering Technology, Naogaon, Bangladesh
44. Cox's Bazar Model Polytechnic Institute
45. N. Islam Institute of Science & Technology, Baipayl, Savar. Est. 2018

=== Public agriculture institutes ===
1. Agriculture Training Institute, Shimultoli, Gazipur
2. Agriculture Training Institute, Rahmatpur, Barisal
3. Agriculture Training Institute, Bancharampur, Brahmanbaria
4. Agriculture Training Institute, Hathazari, Chittagong
5. Agriculture Training Institute, Daulatpur, Khulna
6. Agriculture Training Institute, Begumganj, Noakhali
7. Agriculture Training Institute, Khadimnagar, Sylhet
8. Agriculture Training Institute, Tajhat, Rangpur
9. Agriculture Training Institute, Bonarpara, Gaibandha
10. Agriculture Training Institute, Ishwardi, Pabna
11. Agriculture Training Institute, Jhenaidah
12. Agriculture Training Institute, Faridpur
13. Agriculture Training Institute, Saturia, Manikganj
14. Agriculture Training Institute, Shere Bangla Nagar, Dhaka
15. Agriculture Training Institute, Araihazar, Narayanganj
16. Agriculture Training Institute, Homna, Cumilla
17. Agriculture Training Institute, Rangamati

=== Private agriculture institutes ===
1. ABUL BASHAR KRISHI COLLEGE (MPO), DHAMRAI, DHAKA. (01717214985)
1. Majeda Begum Krishi Projukti College
2. Bahar Krishi College
3. NONDIPUR TECHNICAL & COMMERCIAL COLLEGE, NETRAKONA(MPO).

=== Public fisheries institutes ===
1. Fisheries Diploma Institute, Chandpur
2. Fisheries Diploma Institute, Gopalganj
3. Fisheries Diploma Institute, Kishoreganj
4. Fisheries Diploma Institute, Sirajganj

=== Private fisheries institutes ===
1. Bagerha Krishi Projukti Institute
2. Uttara Agriculture Institute
3. Betgari Mir Shah Alam Krishi and Motsho Projukti Institute
4. M. S. Zoha Krishi College
5. Surid Technical Science & Commerce College

=== Public forestry institute ===
1. Forestry Science and Technology Institute, Chittagong

=== Public livestock institute ===
1. Institute of Livestock Science and Technology (ILST), Gaibandha
2. Institute of Livestock Science and Technology (ILST), Nasirnagar, Brahmanbaria
3. Institute of Livestock Science and Technology (ILST), Shahpur, Khulna
4. Institute of Livestock Science and Technology (ILST), Lalmonirhat
5. Institute of Livestock Science and Technology (ILST), Gopalganj
6. Institute of Livestock Science and Technology (ILST), Netrakona
7. Institute of Livestock Science and Technology (ILST), Sylhet

=== Public marine & shipbuilding technology institutes ===
1. Institute of Marine Technology, Bagerhat
2. Institute of Marine Technology, Chandpur
3. Institute of Marine Technology, Faridpur
4. Institute of Marine Technology, Munshiganj
5. Bangladesh Institute of Marine Technology, Narayanganj
6. Institute of Marine Technology, Sirajganj

=== Private textile and GDPM technology institutes ===
1. Khan Jahan Ali Polytechnic Institute
2. Infra Polytechnic Institute, Barisal
3. Model Polytechnic Institute

=== HSC-vocational institutes ===
1. Bagerhat Technical School and College
2. Bandarban Technical School and College
3. Govt. Technical School and College, Gazipur
4. Feni Govt. Technical School and College, Feni
5. Narayanganj Govt. Technical School and College, Narayanganj

=== HSC-BMT (Business Management and Technology) institutes ===
1. Barisal Technical School and College
2. Bhola Technical School and College
3. Durgasrom Mohila Bm College Netrakona
4. Bangladesh Institute of Studies (BIS)
5. National Youth and Technical training Center
6. Nondipur Technical & Commercial College, Netrakona (MPO).
7. Islampur Govt College

=== Basic trade course institutes ===
1. A K Khan UCEP Kalurghat Technical School, Chittagong
2. RISDA Institute of Technology (RIT), Birulia, Savar
3. RISDA Institute of Technology (RIT), Saltha, Faridpur

== See also ==
- Education in Bangladesh
