= Diploma in Engineering =

Technical academic degree

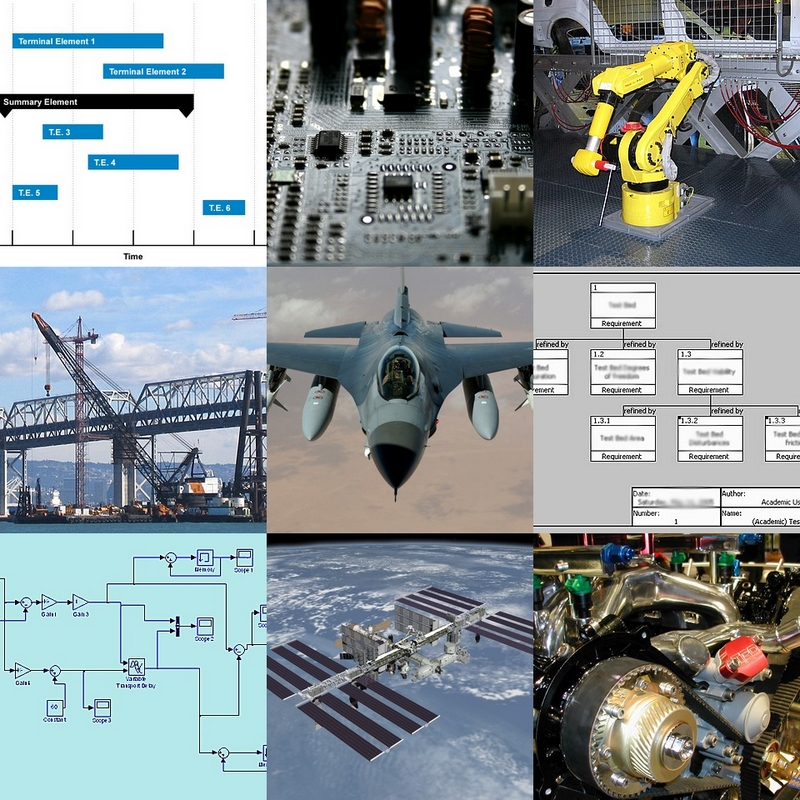
Engineering subjects

The Diploma in Engineering (Dip.Eng.), Diploma in Technology, Diploma in Technical Education, Diploma in Engineering & Technology is a program focused on practical and skills-oriented training . It is a technical course that only covers the essentials when ranked with an undergraduate engineering degree. It aims to provide students with industry or job related basic engineering knowledge, scientific skills, computing and analysis, mathematical techniques, a sound knowledge of English to communicate in the field and the ability to apply problem-solving techniques.

Its duration is a minimum of three years. India recognises this as an equivalent to pre-engineering or a bridging course when considered for continuing studies in engineering related bachelors or associate degree programs. After successful completion of diploma in engineering course, students can either continue further engineering studies in undergraduate level or get employment as technicians, technologists, supervisors, superintendents, foremen, machinist, workshop technicians, draftsman, station technicians (energy, thermal, aeronautical), automobile technicians, maintenance and service technicians, equipment mechanics and technicians, CAD/CAM programmer, agricultural overseers, instrument technicians, junior instructors, manufacturing, tool and die designers.

In some countries, one can apply for this diploma after completion of 10th grade (Secondary School Certificate).

== Disciplines ==
Diplomas in engineering can be obtained in India in many disciplines such as:

- Aeronautical engineering
- Architecture/Architectural engineering
- Automobile/Automotive engineering
- Ceramic Engineering
- Civil engineering
- Chemical engineering
- Computer engineering/Computer Science and engineering
- Environmental engineering
- Electrical engineering
- Electronics engineering
- Telecommunication/Communication engineering
- Electrical and Electronics Engineering
- Electronics and Telecommunication/Communication engineering
- Food technology/engineering
- Glass Engineering
- Refrigeration and Air-Conditioning engineering
- Information technology/engineering
- Instrumentation and Control engineering
- Mechanical engineering
- Mining/Mining and Mine Survey Engineering
- Industrial and Production engineering
- Marine engineering
- Materials engineering
- Mechatronics engineering
- Manufacturing engineering
- Mining Engineering
- Petroleum engineering
- Polymer engineering
- Power Technology engineering
- Plastic technology/engineering
- Printing technology/engineering
- Software engineering
- Rubber technology/engineering
- Textile engineering
- Tool and Die engineering

== Bangladesh ==
In Bangladesh, the diploma in different Technology disciplines (Example: Electrical/Civil/Mechanical Technology) is a Diploma degree awarded by the Bangladesh Technical Education Board and offered by polytechnic institutes. Students can get admitted to diploma in various technology course after completion of their secondary school level. It is a 4-year program with three-and-a-half-year study and six months mandatory internship. Diploma is awarded in a specific branch of Technology. Curriculum includes basic knowledge of engineering, science and practical sessions for skill development.

The diploma holders can get admitted to Bachelor courses in all private and specific public universities in Bangladesh.

== India ==
In India, the diploma in engineering is a 3-year course awarded in a specific branch of engineering e.g. chemical engineering, Mechanical Engineering, civil engineering, electrical engineering, and computer science engineering etc.. It is usually offered in polytechnic institutes recognized by the respective State Boards of Technical Education as well as Private Universities and recognized by the State Departments/Directorates of Technical Educations and All India Council for Technical Education.

Diploma holders are often called junior engineers in India. They can sit for the examination of Associate Member of the Institution of Engineers (AMIE) membership and become member of the Indian Institution of Industrial Engineering (IIIE). Diploma holders can enroll for advanced diploma programs in concentrated job sectors within their area of study. Diploma holders are eligible for lateral entry to the third semester in Bachelor of Engineering/Bachelor of Technology courses in various technical universities. Diploma holders are also eligible for part-time entry to the third semester engineering courses i.e. direct entry to second year. In Tamil Nadu, the government is revolutionizing its technical education by upgrading its diploma courses with newer schemes (L Scheme and forward) to make it equivalent with UK's HND programs that enables students for direct entry into the fifth semester (third year) of a BE/B.Tech of engineering program. Those who have a twelfth grade (Higher Secondary School Certificate) in Physics, Chemistry and Mathematics (PCM) combination, require only to complete two years excluding first year physics, chemistry, mathematics inter science level subjects.

== Pakistan ==
See also : Diploma of Associate Engineering

In Pakistan, the diploma in engineering is a 3-year program awarded by the respective Provincial Boards of Technical Education and offered by the polytechnic institutions. It is equivalent to HSSC (Pre-Engineering) by the Inter Board Committee of Chairmen (IBCC). A candidate having Secondary School Certificate (SSC) or Technical School Certificate (TSC) can enroll in this program. Diploma is offered in various engineering disciplines such as electrical, electronics, computer, telecommunication, mechanical, civil, chemical etc.

Diploma holders are often called associate engineers or sub engineers in Pakistan. They can either get employment or enroll in Bachelor of Technology and Bachelor of Engineering degree programs for higher study.

== See also ==
- Engineering technologist
- Engineering technician
- Mechanic
