= Jashore Polytechnic Institute =

Bangladeshi Polytechnic Institute

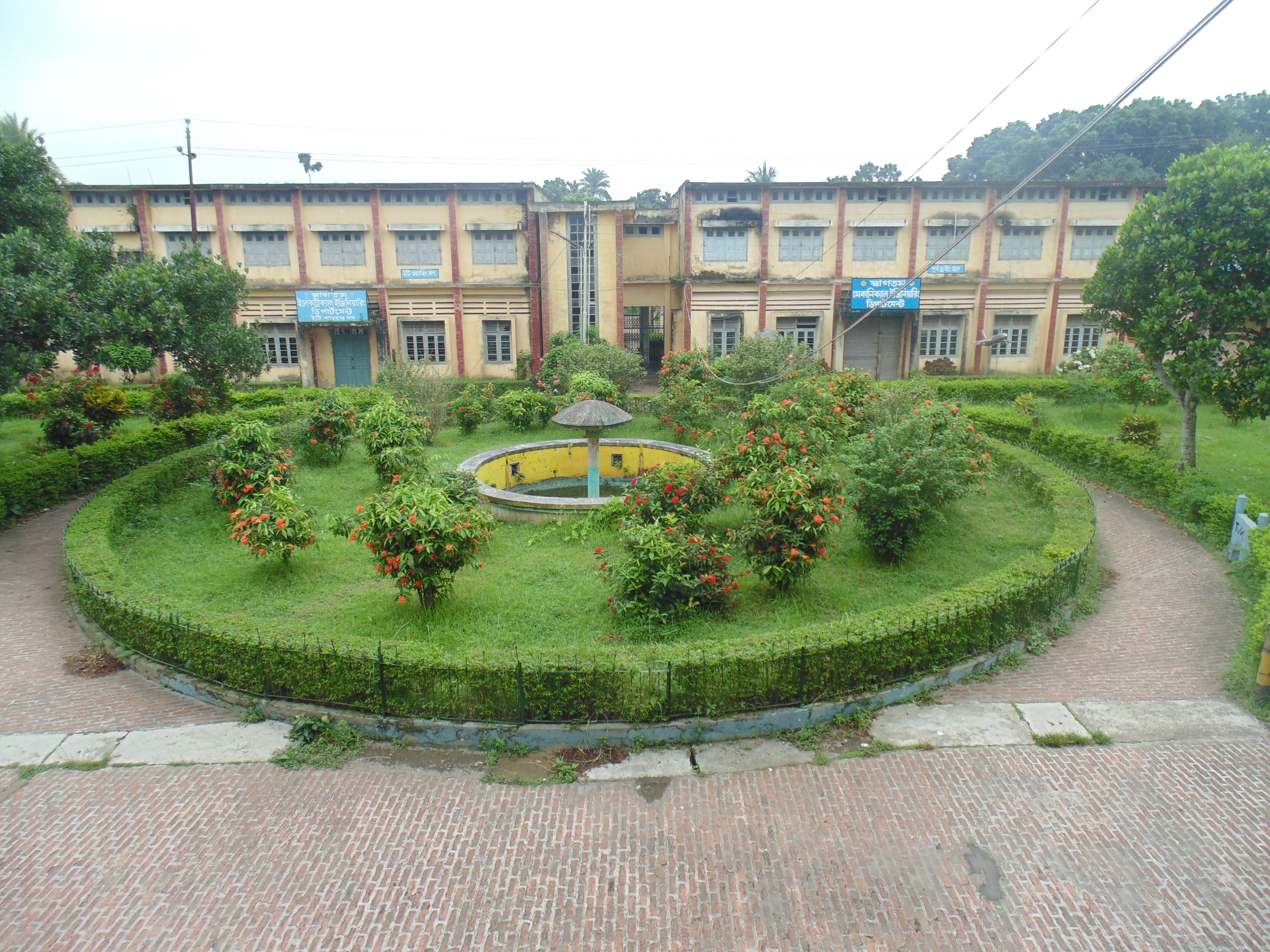
- Type: Polytechnic
- Established: 1964; 62 years ago
- Affiliations: Bangladesh Technical Education Board
- Academic staff: 142+
- Students: 2688+
- Location: Jashore, Bangladesh; 23.175202°N 89.217308°E
- Nickname: JPI (English) য.প.ই (Bangla)
- Website: jpi.edu.bd

Jashore Polytechnic Institute (JPI) is a public polytechnic institute located in Jashore, Bangladesh. It is one of the biggest and oldest polytechnic institutes in Bangladesh.

== History ==
In 1964 it was established on 15 acres of land. Initially, there was a system of teaching both technical and technical disciplines, but in 1969–70, the teaching of mechanical, technology was introduced. Later, it was joined with electrical, electronic, computer and telecommunication technology. On 30 January 2006, the institute saw fractional clashes between activists of Bangladesh Jatiotabadi Chatra Dal activists. On 15 May 2012, the institute was closed after vandalism by activists of Bangladesh Chattra League.
