= Directorate of Technical Education =

Bangladeshi Government Directorate

- Formation: 1960
- Location: F-4 / B, Sher-E-Bangla Nagar Administrative Area, Agargaon, Dhaka-1207, Bangladesh
- Region served: Bangladesh
- Official language: Bengali
- Website: www.techedu.gov.bd

Directorate of Technical Education (কারিগরি শিক্ষা অধিদপ্তর) is a Bangladesh government Directorate under the Ministry of Education responsible for the development, expansion and research in the field of technical education in Bangladesh. Md. Sanowar Hossain is the Director General of the Directorate of Technical Education.

== History ==
Directorate of Technical Education was established in 1960 under the Ministry of Education, when Bangladesh was part of Pakistan. The Directorate is responsible for 64 Technical School and College, 49 Polytechnic Institutes, one Degree Level Technical Teachers Training College and four Engineering College.
