= Institution of Diploma Engineers, Bangladesh =

Bangladeshi professional organization

- Institution of Diploma Engineers, Bangladesh
- ইনস্টিটিউশন অব ডিপ্লোমা ইঞ্জিনিয়ার্স, বাংলাদেশ
- Crest of Institution of Diploma Engineers, Bangladesh
- Abbreviation: IDEB
- Formation: 8 November 1970; 56 years ago
- Type: Nonprofit organisation
- Legal status: Professional association
- Professional title: Sub-Assistant Engineer
- Headquarters: IDEB Bhaban, 160/A VIP Rd, Dhaka 1000
- Location: Dhaka, Bangladesh
- Coordinates: 23°44′14.2″N 90°24′23.8″E
- Fields: Engineering, Technological & Development
- Members: 153,546
- Official language: Bangla, English
- President: Engr. Kobir Hossain
- General Secretary: Engr. Kazi Shakhawat Hossain
- Main organ: Council
- Publication: Karigor
- Affiliations: BTEB; MoE; HBRI; CPSC; IIESL; NSDC; ILO; DTE; a2i; FBCCI; (SESRIC) - OIC; MP, Australia; DCCI; Narayana Health; Swinburne; CGLI; University of Derby; PKSF; BEIIE; RAJUK; Dhaka WASA; PGCB; IAMSMEOFINDIA; ESD, Philippines
- Website: ideb.org.bd
- Formerly called: East Pakistan Institute of Diploma Engineers

Institution of Diploma Engineers, Bangladesh (IDEB) is a professional organization for Diploma Engineers and Diploma Architects in Bangladesh, which was established on 8 November 1970. The aim of this organization is to make a union among diploma holders who are working in field level of different engineering & technological service in different capacities.

IDEB is a multidisciplinary organization which is dedicated in developing the knowledge, understanding and practice for diploma holders in different engineering branch. IDEB also has 11 members of advisory council.

== History ==
The Institution of Diploma Engineers, Bangladesh (IDEB) traces its roots back to 1946 with the formation of the Subordinate Engineers Association. Over the years, diploma engineers struggled for higher education and recognition, especially after Ahsanullah School of Engineering became a degree college and opportunities for diploma holders were curtailed. Their long movement against discrimination and for professional dignity gained strength through the 1950s and 1960s. Finally, on 8 November 1970, the diploma engineers of East Pakistan established the East Pakistan Institute of Diploma Engineers, which after independence became IDEB, the national organization representing diploma engineers of Bangladesh.

During the Bangladesh Liberation War of 1971, its members actively supported the freedom struggle under the inspiration of Bangabandhu Sheikh Mujibur Rahman. After independence, the institute continues to uphold the spirit of 1971 while working for the advancement of diploma engineers and the welfare of the nation.

== Engineering divisions ==
IDEB has twelve divisions within it. They are:

- IDEB Civil Engineering Division
- IDEB Architecture Engineering Division
- IDEB Electrical Engineering Division
- IDEB Computer Engineering Division
- IDEB Mechanical Engineering Division
- IDEB Chemical Engineering Division
- IDEB Marine Engineering Division
- IDEB Graphics Arts Division
- IDEB Glass and Ceramic Division
- IDEB Survey Engineering Division
- IDEB Leather Engineering Division
- IDEB Textile Engineering Division

== IDEB Service Association ==
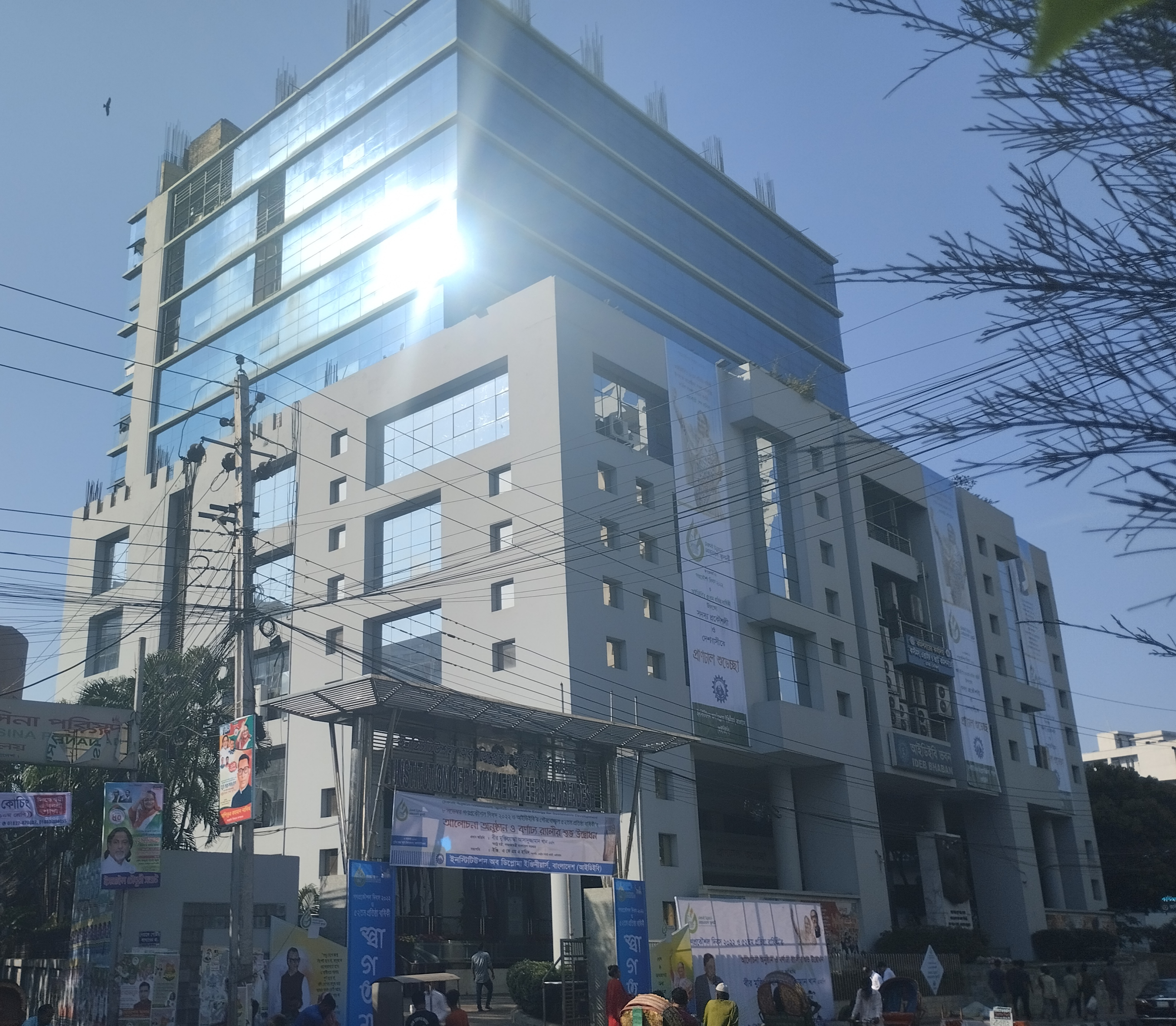
Head Office Building

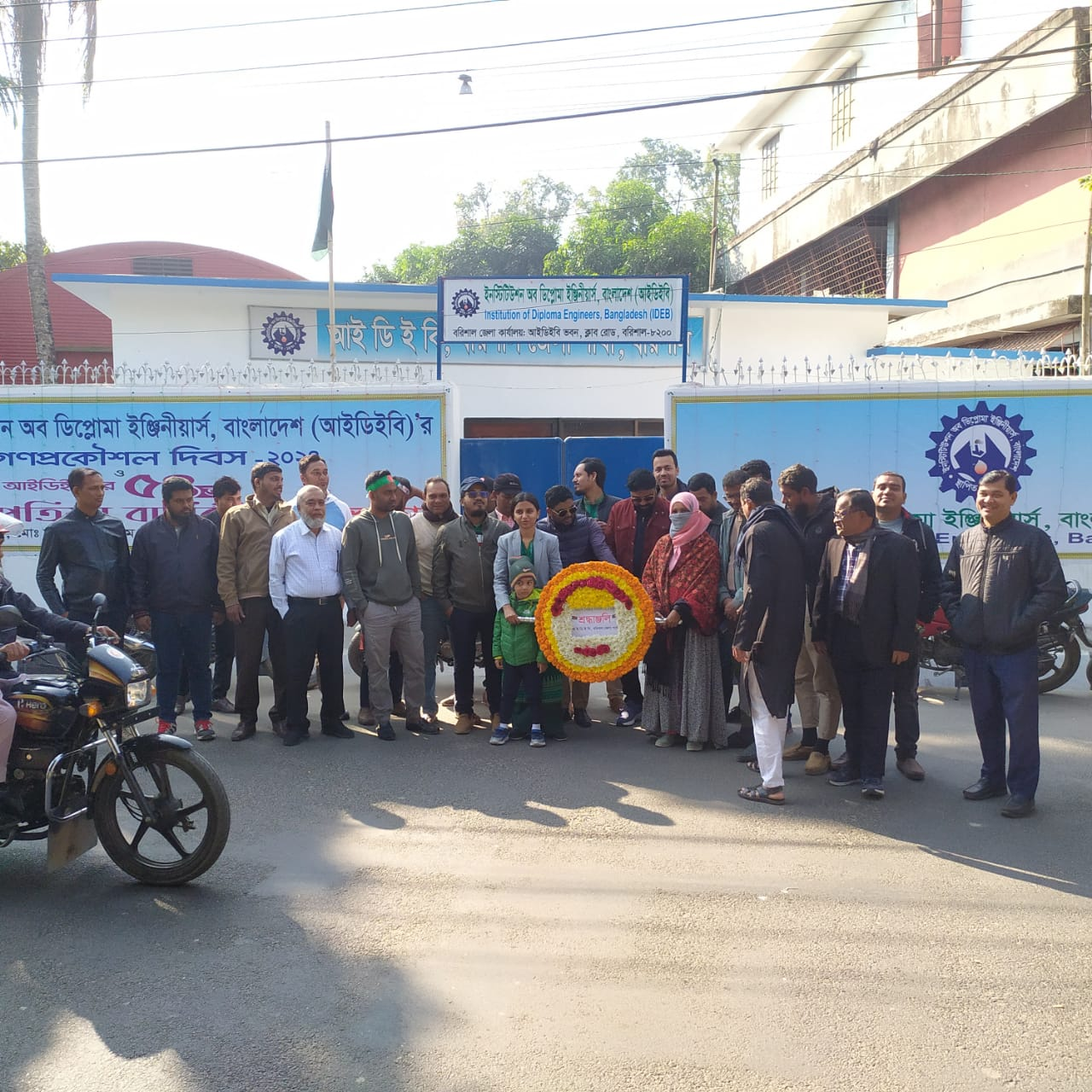
IDEB Barisal Branch Office

Service Associations within the Institution of Diploma Engineers, Bangladesh (IDEB) are departmental branches comprising diploma engineers working in specific government organizations or sectors. These associations play a vital role in representing the professional interests of their members, facilitating coordination within the workplace, and maintaining a link with IDEB's central administration.

As of 2014, IDEB had established 117 Service Associations nationwide. Earlier records from 2013 noted 82 Service Associations at that time. These associations typically span services such as the Bangladesh Railway, Bangladesh Power Development Board, and the Local Government Engineering Department, among others. Examples include the Bangladesh Railway Diploma Engineers' Service Association, Bangladesh PWD Diploma Engineers Association, Bangladesh Power Development Board (BPDB) Diploma Engineers' Service Association, Bangladesh Polytechnic Teachers Association and Local Government Engineering Department (LGED) Diploma Engineers' Service Association, DPDC Diploma Engineers Association, Private Sector Diploma Engineers Federation, Bangladesh. Each association plays a crucial role in supporting its members and advancing IDEB's mission.

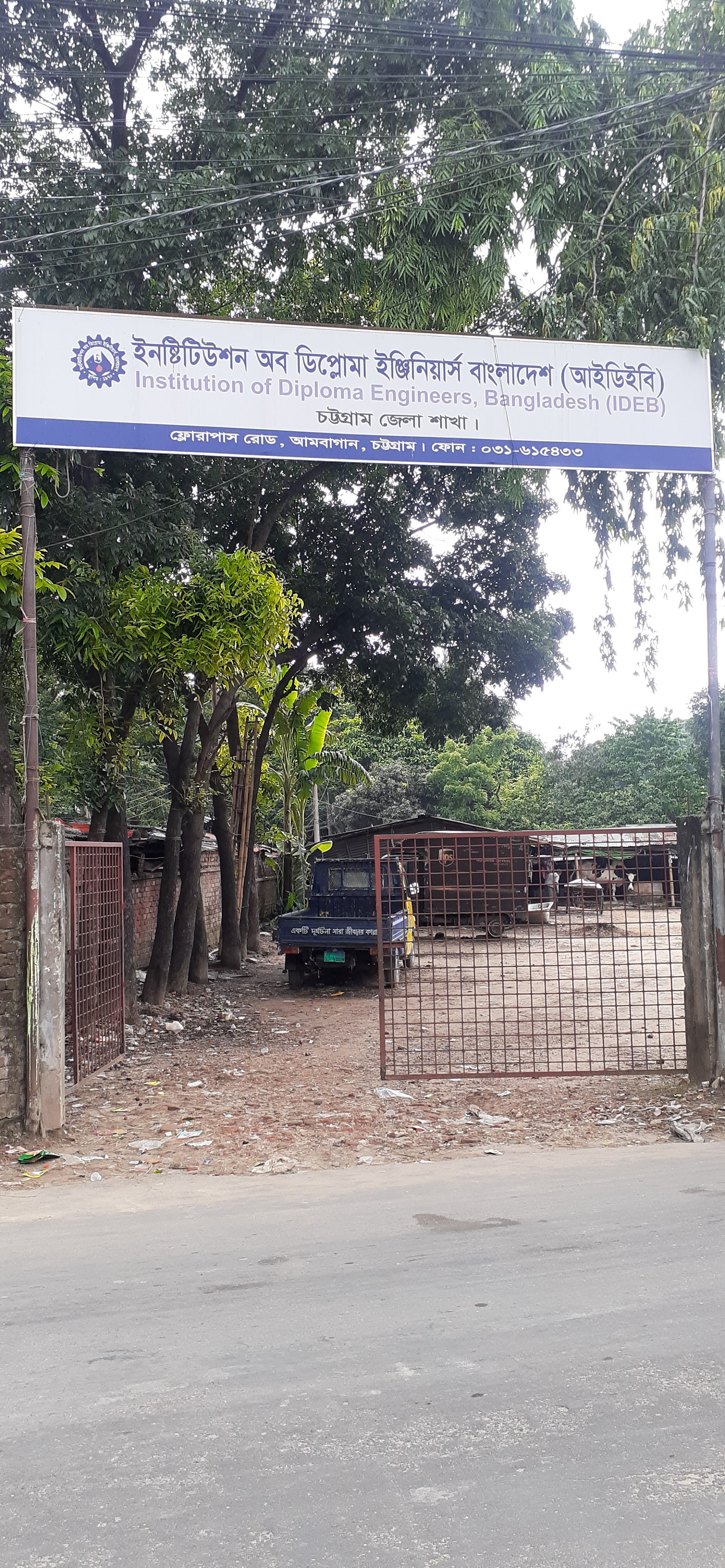
IDEB Chittagong Branch

== Membership ==
People with engineering diplomas, and/or a person having post Matriculation or Post Secondary School Certificate (SSC) with 4 (four) years of schooling in engineering and technology on successful completion be awarded a Diploma in Engineering by any university or Education Board of UK, US, India, Pakistan and Bangladesh and/or as recognized by the government of Bangladesh is eligible for membership of IDEB. IDEB offered six category membership i.e. student member, general member, fellow member, life member, donor member and honorary member.

== IDEB Accreditation ==
The Institution of Diploma Engineers, Bangladesh (IDEB) is recognized for accrediting diploma-level technical education programs across the country. It provides accreditation to all government polytechnic institutes in Bangladesh, including Dhaka Government Polytechnic Institute, Bogura Polytechnic Institute, Barisal Government Polytechnic Institute, Bhola Government Polytechnic Institute, and many others, ensuring that these institutions meet established educational and professional standards. In addition to government institutions, IDEB also accredits select private polytechnic institutes, promoting consistent quality and curriculum alignment in the technical education sector. Through this accreditation, IDEB helps maintain academic rigor, supports professional development for students and faculty, and strengthens the overall credibility and recognition of diploma engineering programs throughout Bangladesh.

== Division and cell ==
=== Study & Research Division ===
IDEB formed a research and study cell to contribute to the nation and the people in development works. This cell conducts studies on various issues and problems and suggests recommendations that may help planners and policymakers to adopt appropriate policies and plans in various technological fields like irrigation, flood control, roads and highways, electricity, energy, waterlogging in cities/towns, education, health, sanitation, housing and all other productive commonalities. The institution has also been conducting activities viz. submitting memoranda, holding press conferences, and meeting with authorities to press the demands of the members and to correct and revise wrong national policies, projects and programs.

=== ICT & Innovation Cell ===
IDEB has an ICT & Innovation cell to empower its members in ICT & Encourage its members in Innovation Activity. This cell has two wings IDEB Women's ICT Wing & Innovation Coordination committee.

==== IDEB Women's ICT Wing ====
IDEB Women's ICT Wing is one of two wings under the ICT & Innovation Cell of the Institution of Diploma Engineers, Bangladesh (IDEB). This wing focuses on promoting women's participation in information and communication technology, aiming to strengthen digital literacy and empower female diploma engineers through targeted ICT initiatives within the IDEB community.

==== Innovation Coordination committee ====
The Innovation Coordination Committee is a wing of the ICT & Innovation Cell within the Institution of Diploma Engineers, Bangladesh (IDEB). It focuses on encouraging innovation among IDEB members and is part of the broader effort to empower members with ICT skills.

== Institute ==
=== IDEB Education & Training Institute ===
IDEB Education & Training Institute, accredited by Bangladesh Technical Education Board is to provide the best learning experience to our students to achieve the best outcomes for their future. In order to progress to our vision, we count on a healthy academic environment for staff, trainees, and students.

=== IDEB Research & Technological Institute ===
IDEB Research & Technological Institute is a research-oriented institution under the Institution of Diploma Engineers, Bangladesh (IDEB). It focuses on technological advancement, applied engineering studies, and innovation. The institute also operates the IDEB IoT & Robotics Research Lab, which is dedicated to research and development in areas such as Internet of Things (IoT), robotics, and automation, aiming to promote practical solutions and skill development in emerging technologies.

=== Bangladesh-India Professional Skill Development Institute (BIPSDI) ===
The Bangladesh-India Professional Skill Development Institute in Khulna, affiliated with the Institution of Diploma Engineers, Bangladesh (IDEB), was jointly inaugurated in 2019 by the Prime Ministers of Bangladesh and India. Established on the IDEB Khulna campus, the institute is part of a bilateral initiative to enhance industrial growth by developing a skilled workforce. It functions as a technical and vocational training center, offering programs aimed at improving professional competencies in various fields. This project reflects the commitment of both countries to strengthening cooperation in human resource development, with a focus on skill enhancement, industry-oriented training, and capacity building to meet the demands of modern industries.

=== Bangladesh-India Dairy & Food Processing Institute ===
Source:

=== IDEB Jessore Nowapara Model Primary School ===
Source:

== Library ==
The IDEB maintain a library namely "IDEB Shadhinota Pathagar" at 2nd floor of IDEB Bhaban, 160/A, Kakrail VIP Road, Dhaka-1000, Bangladesh with various type of books viz. Engineering, Technology, Social Science, General Science, Philosophy, Historical and other disciplines. There is a fixed program to collect a number of books every year regularly to enrich the library.

IDEB members visit the library regular for seeking knowledge by readout the reserved books. The management authority of library is proud for spreading knowledge to society by maintaining it. They seek co-operation & help from government & non-government official, intellectual, writer & donor agencies for abounding the library.

== Publication ==
The IDEB publishes a monthly socio-technological journal, Karigar ("The Artisan"). Its editorial board, made up of diploma engineers, selects the articles, and special supplements are published occasionally.

== Conference ==
IDEB has organized several National and International Conferences in Engineering, Technology & Education.

- International Conference on "TVET for Sustainable Development 2015"; International Conference on TVET for Sustainable Development was jointly organized by IDEB and CPSC, Manila. It was first international conference on Technical Voactional Education & Training (TVET) in Bangladesh.
- International Conference on "Skills for the Future World of Work and TVET for Global Competitiveness 2017"; The International Conference on "Skills for the Future World of Work and TVET for Global Competitiveness" has taken place in July 2017 at the Institution of Diploma Engineers Bangladesh (IDEB), Dhaka, Bangladesh. The conference was jointly organizing by IDEB and Colombo Plan Staff College (CPSC), Manila, Philippines. in Association with Ministry of Education(MoE) Government of Bangladesh, National Skills Development Council (NSDC) Where International Labour Organization (ILO), Directorate of Technical Education (DTE) and Bangladesh Technical Education Board, Access to information in Bangladesh (a2i), ESD Australia, International Organization for Migration (IOM), Palli Karma Sahayak Foundation (PKSF), Skills and Training Enhancement Project - STEP, Bureau of Manpower Employment and Training (BMET), Federation of Bangladesh Chambers of Commerce & Industries (FBCCI), Bangladesh Employers Federation (BEF) was the Co-partner of the Conference.

This international conference was addressed the future demand of skilled manpower and the acceleration process to ensure the demand based quality Technical and Vocational Education & Training (TVET).

== People's Engineering Day ==
People's Engineering Day is being celebrated throughout the country on the founding anniversary day of the Institution of Diploma Engineer's Bangladesh (IDEB) on 8 November each year of the Headquarters and at all centers in a befitting manner to animate science & technology to the people. At the eve of the day, taken programs have been brought out to the Nation through News conference. Special supplementary is published in National Dailies and special picture broadcast participating leaders in Bangladesh Television and other Electronic Media. The messages are being given by Honorable President, Prime Minister, National Parliament Speaker, Opposition Leader, Member of Cabinet and different political parties' chief on the occasion. Colorful rally's being brought out by the participating member Engineers and polytechnic teachers and students. On the occasion of Peoples Engineering Day IDEB arranged week-wide program with various discussion meeting, seminar, technical lecture session on national issues and blood donation program is a regular program considering the distressed humanity.
