= CPSC =

CPSC may refer to:

- U.S. Consumer Product Safety Commission, a government agency
- Caloric Porous Structure Cell, a ceramic heat cell
- Colombo Plan Staff College, an inter-governmental organization in Asia Pacific for Technical and Vocational Education and Training
- Chuuk Political Status Commission
