= Shia Islam in Bangladesh =

Muslim religious minority

Bangladeshi Shia Muslims
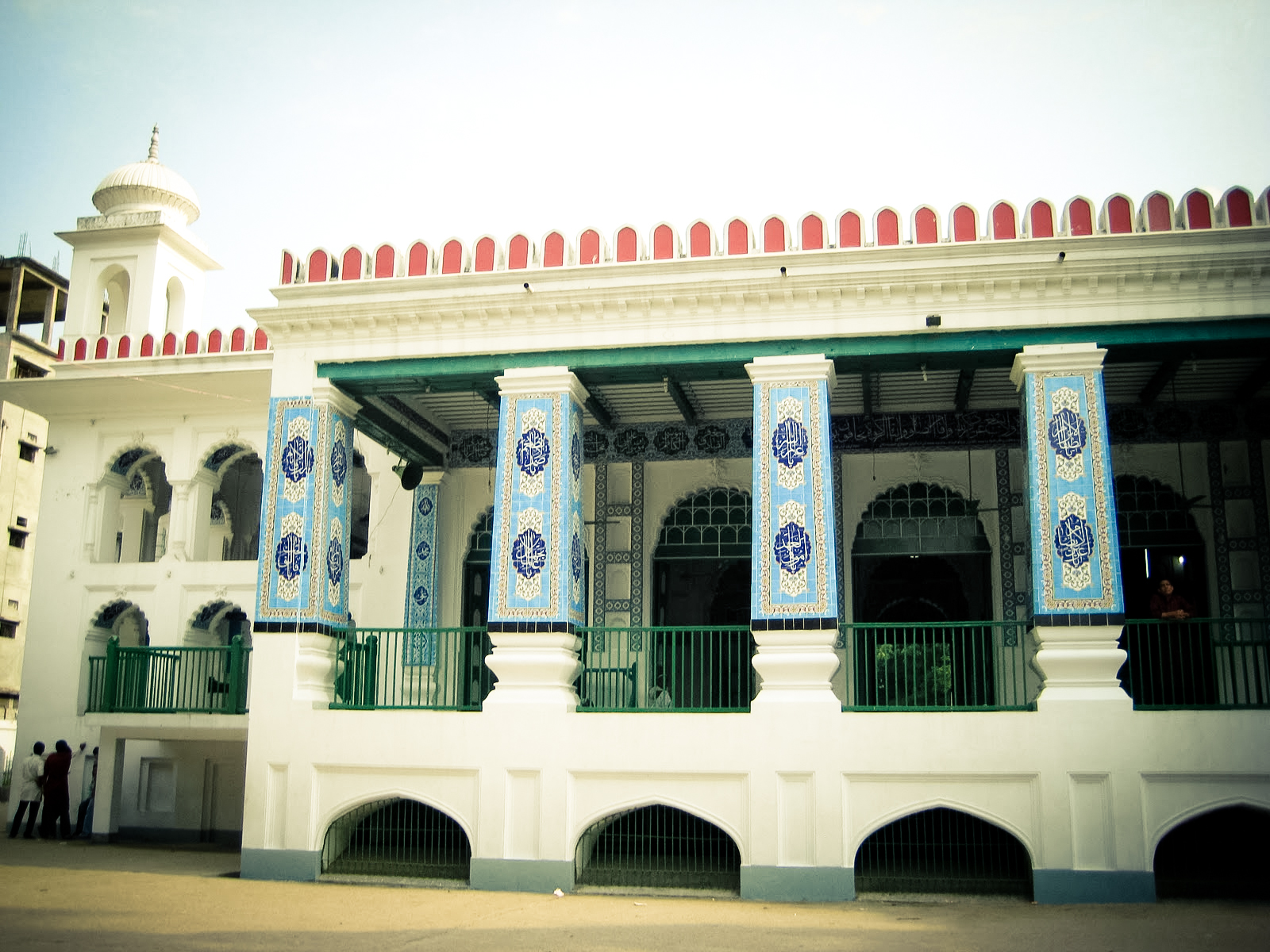
- Hussaini Dalan, the largest Imambara and Shi'ite mosque in Bangladesh

Total population
- approx. 2,972,000 (2011 estimate)

Religions
- Shia Islam (mainly Twelver, Dawoodi Bohra & Nizari Ismaili)

Languages
- Bengali and Urdu (by the Bihari Muslim community)

Shia Muslims are a minority in Bangladesh, with roughly 2% of the population being Shia.

== Distribution ==
Among the Shias, the Dawoodi Bohra community is concentrated in Chittagong as well as the Nizari Ismaili community also found in Dhaka. The Hussaini Dalan in Bakhshibazar, Dhaka is the largest Shia masjid and the main Hussainiya of the country.

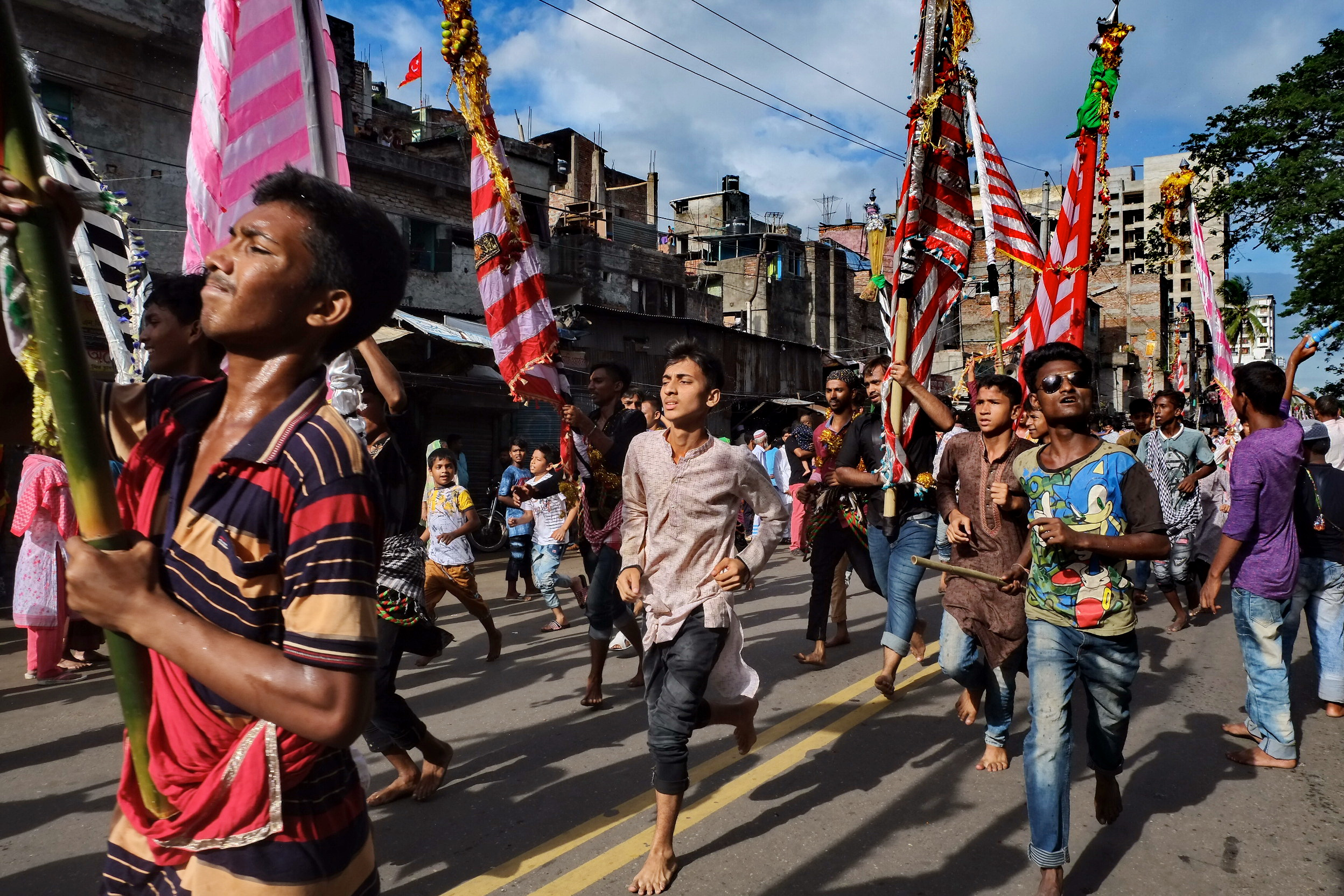
Shias celebrating Ashura at Geneva Camp, Mohammadpur, Dhaka

There are numerous Imambaras and Shia mosques across Dhaka in places such as Adabar, Paltan, Mohammadpur, Farashganj and Azimpur. Twelver communities reside in the northeastern Sylhet Division in places such as Kulaura and Rajtila, and have ties with the Prithimpassa family. In Bhandaria, Pirojpur, there is the Twin Mosque of Bhelai Chokdar which is a relic of Shia interactions in southern Bangladesh. In contrast, the Shalbari Mosque in Thakurgaon, northern Bangladesh, dates as late as 1888. There are also imambaras in Manikganj, Kishoreganj, Austagram and Saidpur.

== History ==
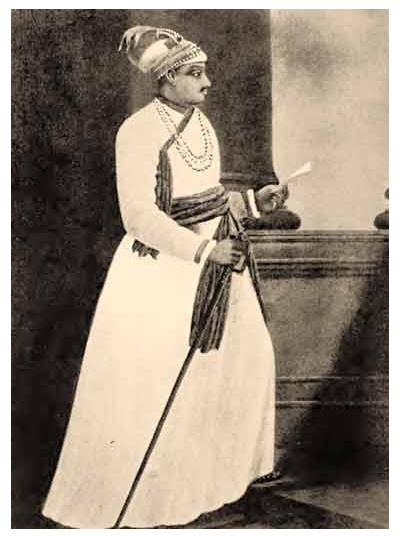
Siraj ud-Daulah, the last independent Nawab of Bengal.

Most of the Twelvers migrated to South Asia to prosper and obtain high positions in various Sultanates and later Mughal Empire. Many were also rebels and nobles who lost royal favour in Persia. The Mughals also preferred to employ foreign Muslim officials that had no local interests and thus were loyal to the emperor. All five Nawabs of Bengal happened to be Shia Muslims.

During the Sultanate era, a Shia nobleman named Sakhi Salamat settled in the village of Prithimpassa in Kulaura in 1499. His son, Ismail Khan Lodi, was granted numerous jagirs and the Prithimpassa family thereon became one of the principal families of Greater Sylhet belonging to the erstwhile feudal nobility of eastern Bengal.

=== Mughal era ===
The oldest Shia imambara in the country was the Bibi Ka Rauza in Farashganj, Dhaka, constructed in 1608 by Amir Khan. The building is not fully extant though. During the reign of emperor Jahangir, a Shi'ite by the name of Ibrahim Khan Fath-i-Jang was given the Subahdari (governorship) of Bengal in 1617 and so he set off for Dhaka, bringing many fellow Shi'ites alongside him.

The Sunni governor of Mughal Bengal Shah Shuja's mother, two wives and teacher were all Shi'ites. So many of Shuja's courtiers were Shia such that a saying became prevalent in Dhaka that Shuja had brought with him 300 Shi'ites whom he got settled in different parts of Bengal. Although a staunch Sunni, his rivals in Delhi even started to spread rumours that Shuja had converted to Shi'ism. It was during his term in 1642, that the naval chief Sayyid Murad constructed the Hussaini Dalan in Dhaka.

The next governor of Mughal Bengal, Mir Jumla II also belonged to Shia faith

Mir Sayyid Shakrullah al-Husayni of Najaf was one of the Shia noblemen brought by Shuja, and he was the ancestor of Nawab Sayyid Chottan Saheb, who had a large estate in Abul Hasnat Road in Dhaka. The estate contains the Mohammadi Begum Imambara, which was built in 1707.

From 1717 until 1880, three successive Nawab dynasties – the Nasiri, Afshar and Najafi – ruled over Bengal, and all belonged to the Shia faith.

Murshid Quli Khan was originally born into a poor Deccani Hindu family, before being sold into slavery and bought by Haji Shafi, a Persian merchant from Isfahan who had converted him to Shia Islam. He later worked his way up, eventually becoming the first of the Nawabs of Bengal and founding the Nasiri dynasty. He transferred Bengal's capital from Jahangirnagar (Dhaka) to Murshidabad in present-day India.

=== Colonial era ===
Mir Ashraf Ali (d. 1829), a devout Shi'ite from Shiraz, migrated to Dhaka in the 18th century, where, he gained prominence as a landlord and courtier to the Naib Nazims of Dhaka. With properties spreading across Dhaka, Comilla, Barisal, Mymensingh and Chittagong; Ali became the wealthiest person in eastern Bengal in his time, with hundreds of employed farmers and numerous charitable donations towards the city of Dhaka. In response to Shah Abdul Aziz's famous criticism on the Twelver ideology, Ali sent a large sum of money to Iraq in return for a response to the criticism by the senior Shi'ite clerics there. It is unknown whether a response was given.

In 1799, Agha Muhammad Reza, a Mughal Shia nobleman in Sylhet of Iranian origin rebelled against the East India Company. Gaining support from thousands of peasants after claiming to be a Sufi saint, Reza successfully invaded the nearby Kachari Kingdom. Later proclaiming himself as the Mahdi (promised messiah) and twelfth imam, he was captured and imprisoned in Calcutta.

In 1861, the Bibi Ka Rauza Imambara in Farashganj, Dhaka was renovated by RM Doshanji. In the 19th century, descendants of the Shia zamindar family of Sitalpur in Purnia, Bihar migrated to the village of Sindurna in Thakurgaon in modern-day Bangladesh. Shaykh Muhammad Raj of this family built the Shalbari Mosque for the Shia community in the village in 1888, and the site remains a popular tourist attraction. In 1891, the Mir Yaqub Imambara was constructed in 1 Hussaini Dalan Road, Dhaka. It was refurbished in 2004 by the Shia Anjuman-e-Husayni.

== Contemporary persecution ==
Despite a long and rich history in the country, presently Shi'ite groups are the target of sectarian violence. For instance, in 2015, a Shi'ite Ashura gathering was bombed.

== See also ==
- Shia Islam in the Indian subcontinent
- List of Shia Muslim Dynasties
- Public holidays in Bangladesh
- Bangladesh–Iran relations
