= K. Vardachari Thiruvengadam =

Indian doctor

K.V. Thiruvengadam FRCPE was an Indian physician and medical teacher, and the son of Krishna Varadachari.

He graduated from the Stanley Medical College in Chennai (Madras) in 1950. He was the recipient of the Padma Shri award (1981) for his contributions in the medical field. During his academic career, Thiruvengadam was declared the best outgoing medical student of the Stanley Medical College and the University of Madras in 1950. He was awarded a number of prizes and medals including the Government Gold Medal of the Stanley Medical College, and the Raja of Panagal Medal for the best outgoing medical student of the University of Madras.

Thiruvengadam served for 31 years in the Madras Medical Service as a medical teacher. He underwent training in chest diseases under The Colombo Plan in Brompton Hospital, London and the MRC Unit at Cardiff, from 1958 to 1959. He was recognized as a medical teacher by the Medical Council of India, with the Dr. B. C. Roy Award for eminent medical teacher, and he has been regent for the International College of Chest Physicians for India. His services as a medical teacher were recognized with distinguished service awards by the Ramachandra Medical College, and by the Diabetic Association of India. The National Board of Examination honoured him for his services as a medical teacher in 2000. The Indian Chest Society awarded Thiruvengadam the "Distinguished Chest Physician" award. He was also a recipient of the Lifetime Achievement Award of Madras Neuro Trust.

He served on the Scientific Advisory Committee of the Indian Council of Medical Research, the Indian Pharmacopoeia Committee, the Board of Studies of the Dr. M.G.R. Medical University, and other institutions. As the chief of the Medicinal Chemistry Research unit of the Madras Medical College, he and his colleagues conducted studies on indigenous medicines, especially Ayurvedic preparations. He gave a number of endowment orations, and had a large number of publications to his credit, particularly in chest diseases. He chaired a session on Antibiotics at Geneva in 1970 under the auspices of the International College of Chest Physicians.

Dr Thiruvengadam practiced as a physician, in consultation practice in internal medicine, chest diseases, asthma and allergies for nearly 45 years. He was the recipient of the "For the sake of Honour" award of the Rotary Club of Madras, the "Vocational Excellence Award" of the Rotary Club of Madras Marina and "The cathedral Excellence" award of the Lions Club, for his academic work. He was elected Fellow of the Royal College of Physicians of Edinburgh in 1982, and Fellow of the National Academy of Medical Sciences in 1972. He received the Star of Stanley Award as a distinguished alumnus and teacher of Stanley Medical College in 2001. The MGR Medical University awarded him the Honorary Doctorate of Sciences in 1996. Dr. K.V. Thiruvengadam was also a student of K.S. Sanjivi, founder of the Voluntary Health Services (VHS).
