= Hussaini Dalan =

Muslim religious building

- হোসেনি দালান
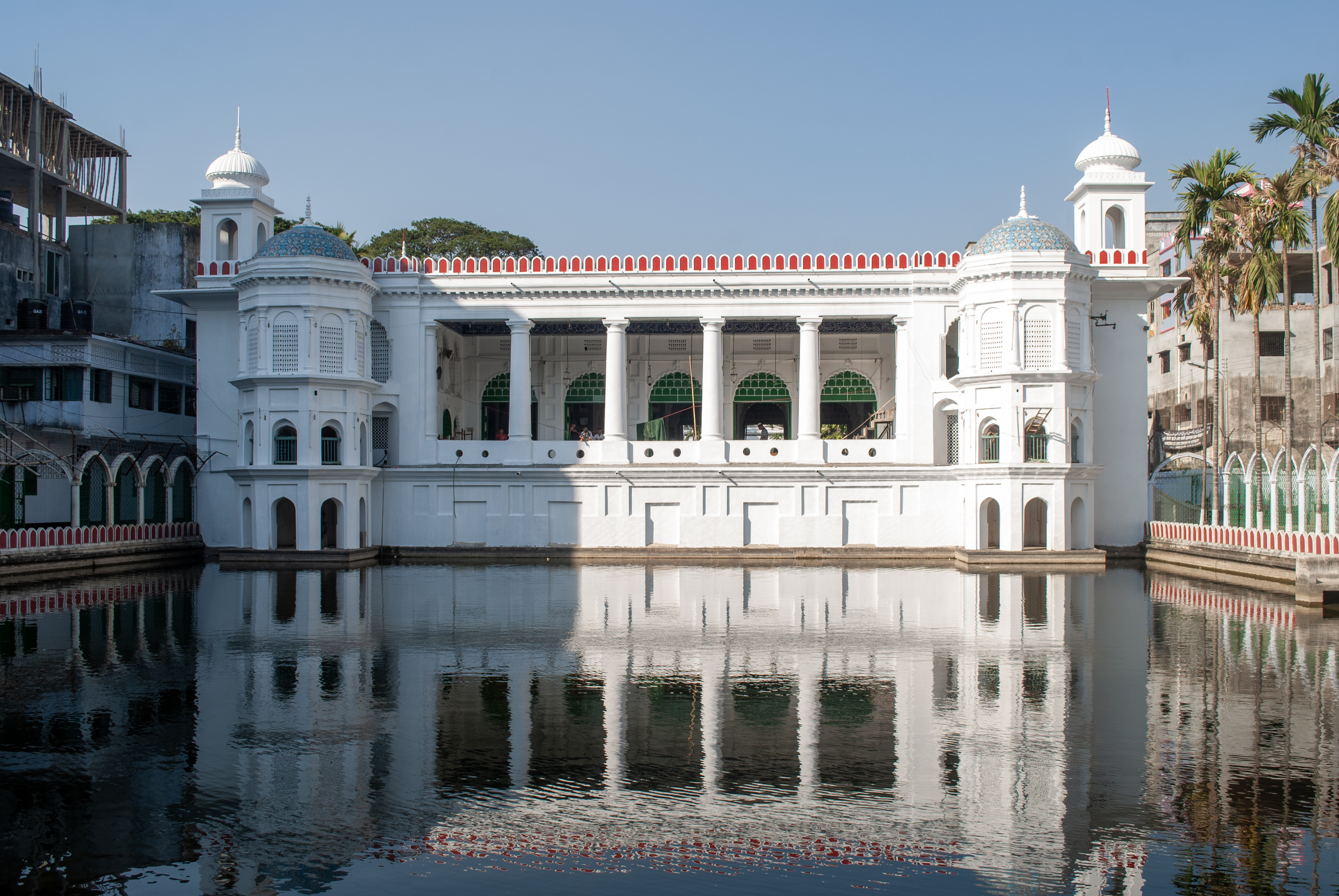
- South view of Hussaini Dalan in 2011

- Location in Bangladesh

Religion
- Affiliation: Shia (Twelver)
- Festival: Day of Ashura
- Ecclesiastical or organisational status: Hussainiya
- Status: Active

Location
- Location: Dhaka, Dhaka District
- Country: Bangladesh
- Interactive map of Hussaini Dalan
- Coordinates: 23.7224°N 90.3979°E

Architecture
- Type: Islamic architecture
- Style: Mughal; British Colonial
- Founder: Mir Murad
- Funded by: Shah Shuja
- Established: 1015 AH (1606/1607 CE)
- Interior area: 871 m^{2} (9,380 sq ft)

The Hussaini Dalan (Bengali: হোসেনি দালান, Arabic: حسیني دلان) is a Twelver Shi'ite Imambara that was originally built during the later half of the Mughal rule in the 17th century in Dhaka. It was built as the Imambara of the Shia Muslim community. Hussaini Dalan serves as the main Hussainiya of Dhaka, or venue for majlis or gatherings held during the month of Muharram; the ten-day religious gathering commemorates the martyrdom of Hussain, the grandson of the Islamic prophet Muhammad.

== History ==
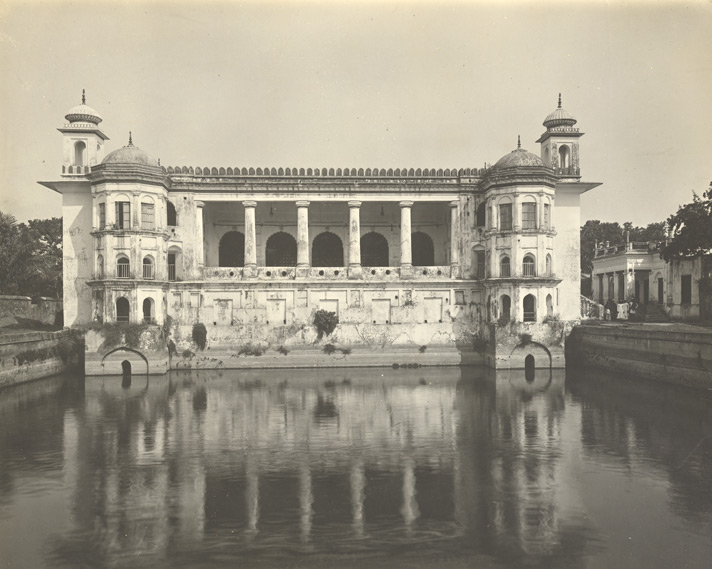
Hussaini Dalan in 1904

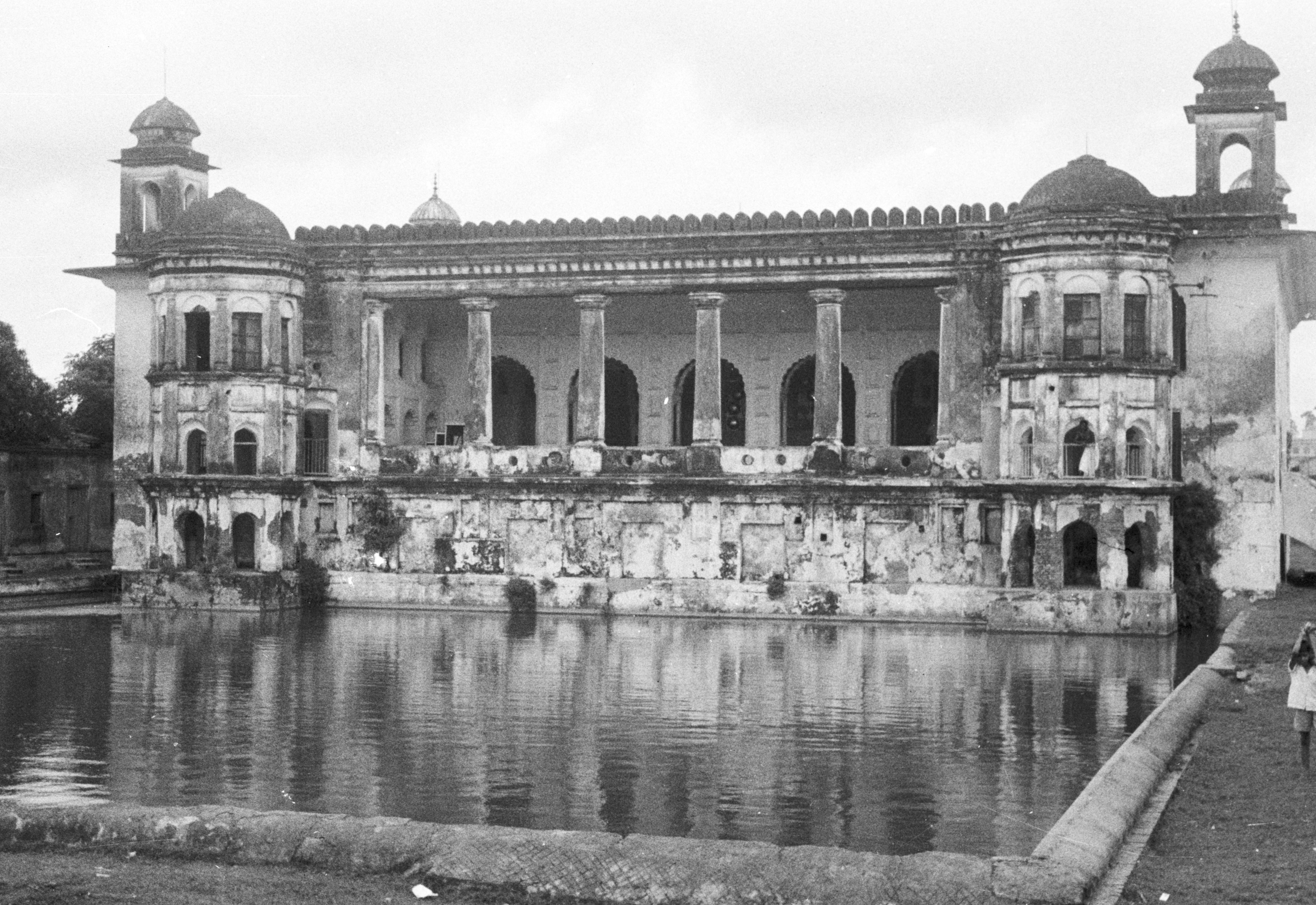
Hussain Dalan in 1967

According to Taylor (1839),

The principal Mahommedan places of worship are the Edgah and Hossainee Delaun, the latter is said to have been built by a person named Mir Murad, who held the Darogahship of the Nawarrah Mehals, and had charge of the public buildings in the time of Sultan Muhammad Azam.

It was built during the Subedari of Prince Shah Shuja (r. 1639–1647 and 1652–1660), son of Mughal emperor Shah Jahan. Although Shuja was a Sunni Muslim, he patronized Shia institutions too. According to tradition, “Mir Murad had a vision of Imam Hussain erecting a 'taziah khana' or house of mourning which led to the construction of Hussaini Dalan.

Raised on the foundations of a former small taziakhana, the building has undergone alterations. During the rule of the East India Company, it was repaired in 1807 and 1810. The original date of construction is still disputed, but Hussaini Dalan in its present form is attributed to Naib Nazim Nusrat Jung, who rebuilt the imambara in 1823. The present flat roof was rebuilt by Nawab of Dhaka Sir Khwaja Ahsanuallah Bahadur after the earthquake of 1897, and another verandah was added to the southern side. From 1843 to 1975, the family of the Dhaka Nawabs held the uninterrupted custodianship (mutawalli) of Hussaini Dalan.

== Architecture ==
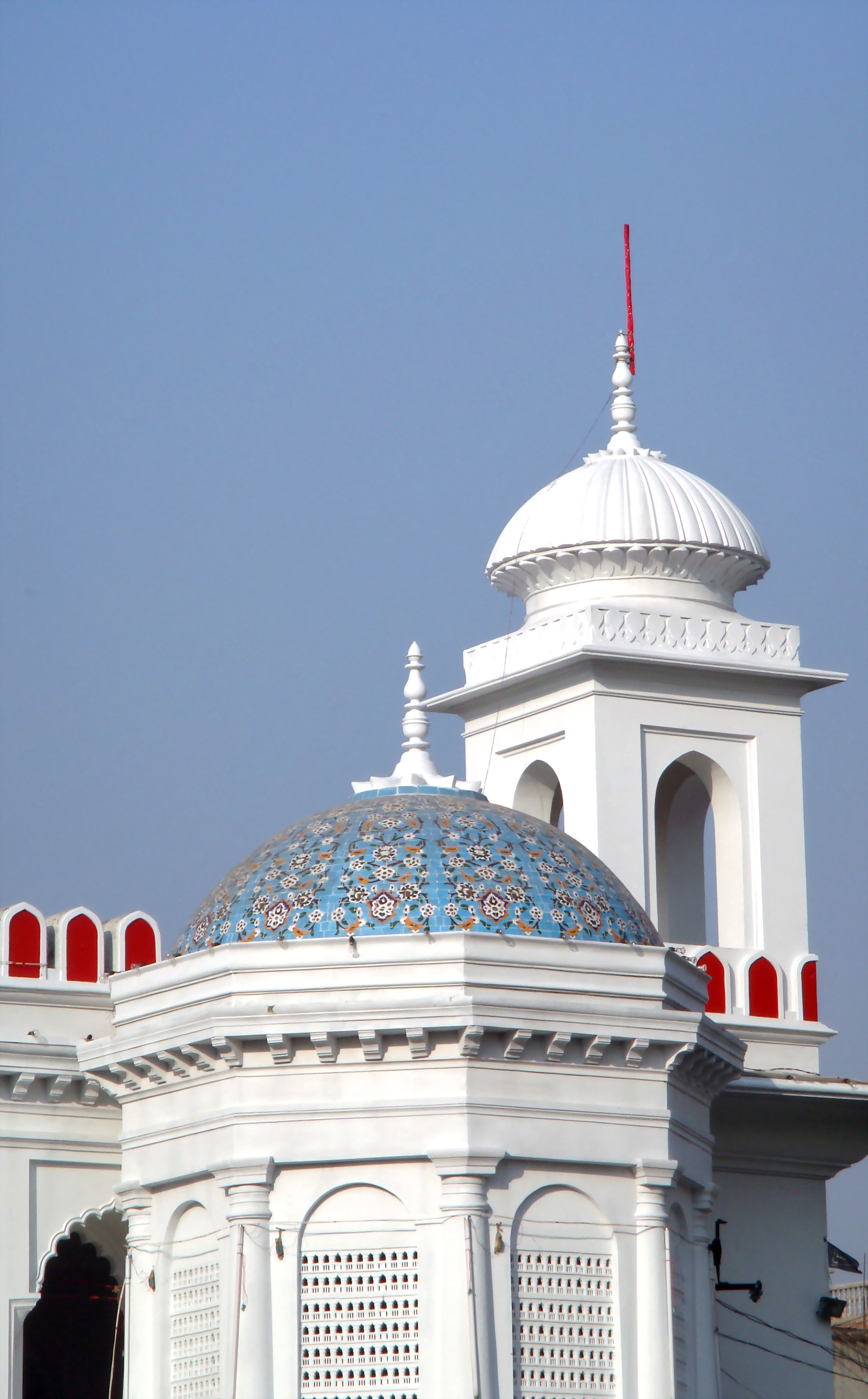
Rising minaret

The main building is situated in the middle of the complex, built on an area of about 0.65 bighas (9,380 sq. ft/ 871 sq. meters). In the south touching the building there is a pond having an area of 1.01 bighas (14,544 sq. ft/ 1377 sq meters). This pond is the main attraction of this building which touches the walls of the building.

Built on a raised platform, it is a long rectangular building with four cabins at the corners. An arched gateway to the north gives right of entry to the building, while a stonework water tank is located directly to the south of the building.

The exterior incorporates both Mughal and British Colonial architectural traditions. The south verandah, overlooking the deep-water tank, best illustrates a western background, with four columns of Doric order supporting the verandah. Mughal characteristics are seen in the attached three-storeyed pavilion with arched windows and a row of kanjuras (decorative merlons) on the roof.

The main floor of the building is raised on a platform that has rooms containing graves. On the main floor, two large halls known as Shirni hall and Khutba hall are placed back to back to form the nucleus of the building complex. Subsidiary two-storied rooms are on either side of the halls, probably to accommodate a congregation of ladies. Also, there is a series of three rooms on the east and the west. The side rooms, with the exception of those in the northernmost side room, have galleries on the second storey.

== Celebrations ==
Shia Muslims are a minority in Dhaka. During the first 10 days of Muharram, Hussaini Dalan becomes a centre of mourning and religious gathering in old Dhaka. Both Sunni and the Shia followers join the mourning, usually ending in Ashura when a large procession parades through the streets, though mourning continues from the 1st day of muharram to 10th of the Islamic month Safar.

== Bomb attacks ==
On the night of October 23, 2015, at around 2:00 am on October 24, a bomb attack occurred in the Hussaini Dalan area during preparations for the Tazia procession on the occasion of Ashura. One person was killed and over a hundred were injured. This was the first attack on a Tazia procession in Bangladesh.

== Gallery ==
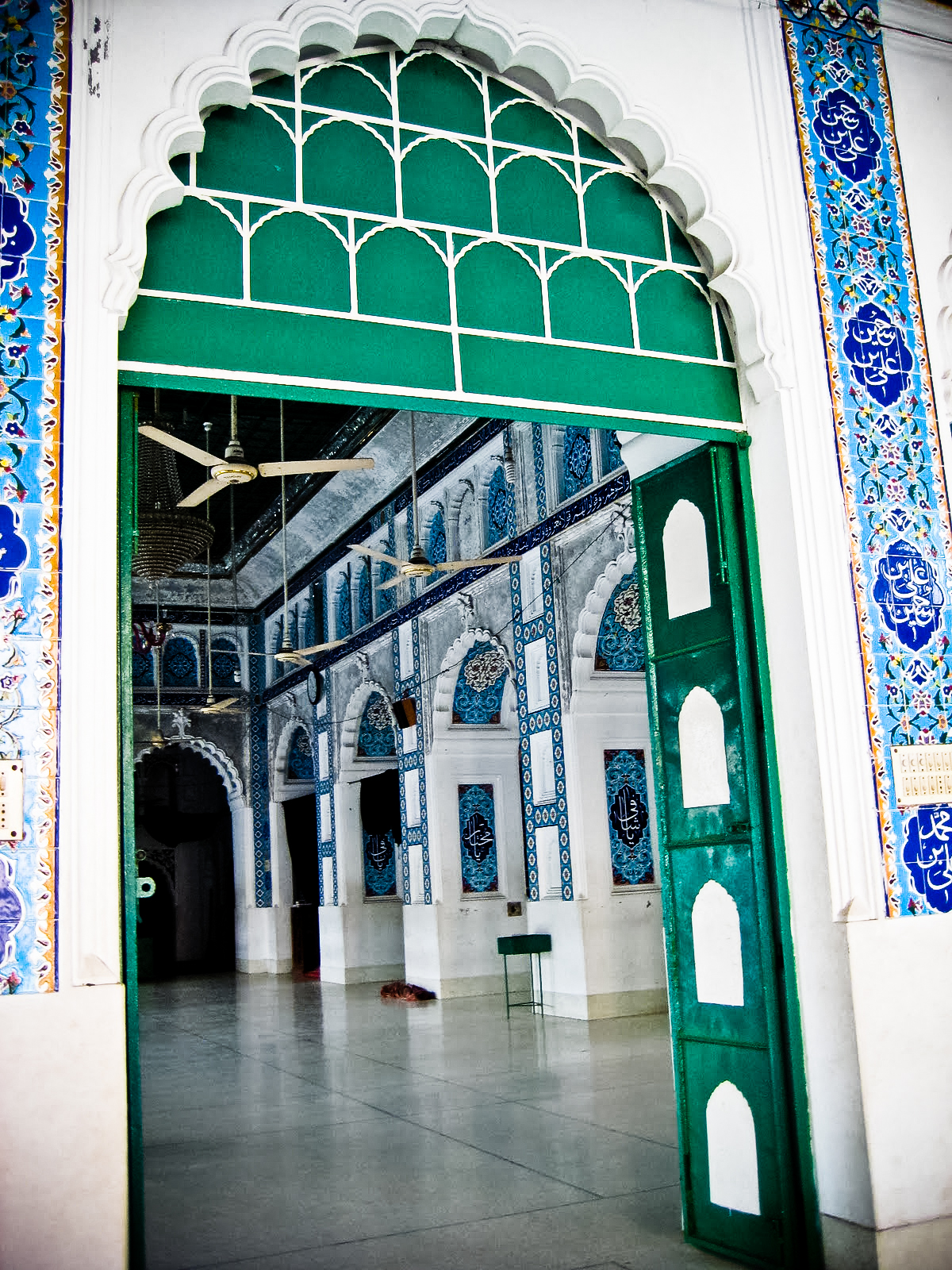
Entrance to Hussaini Dalan

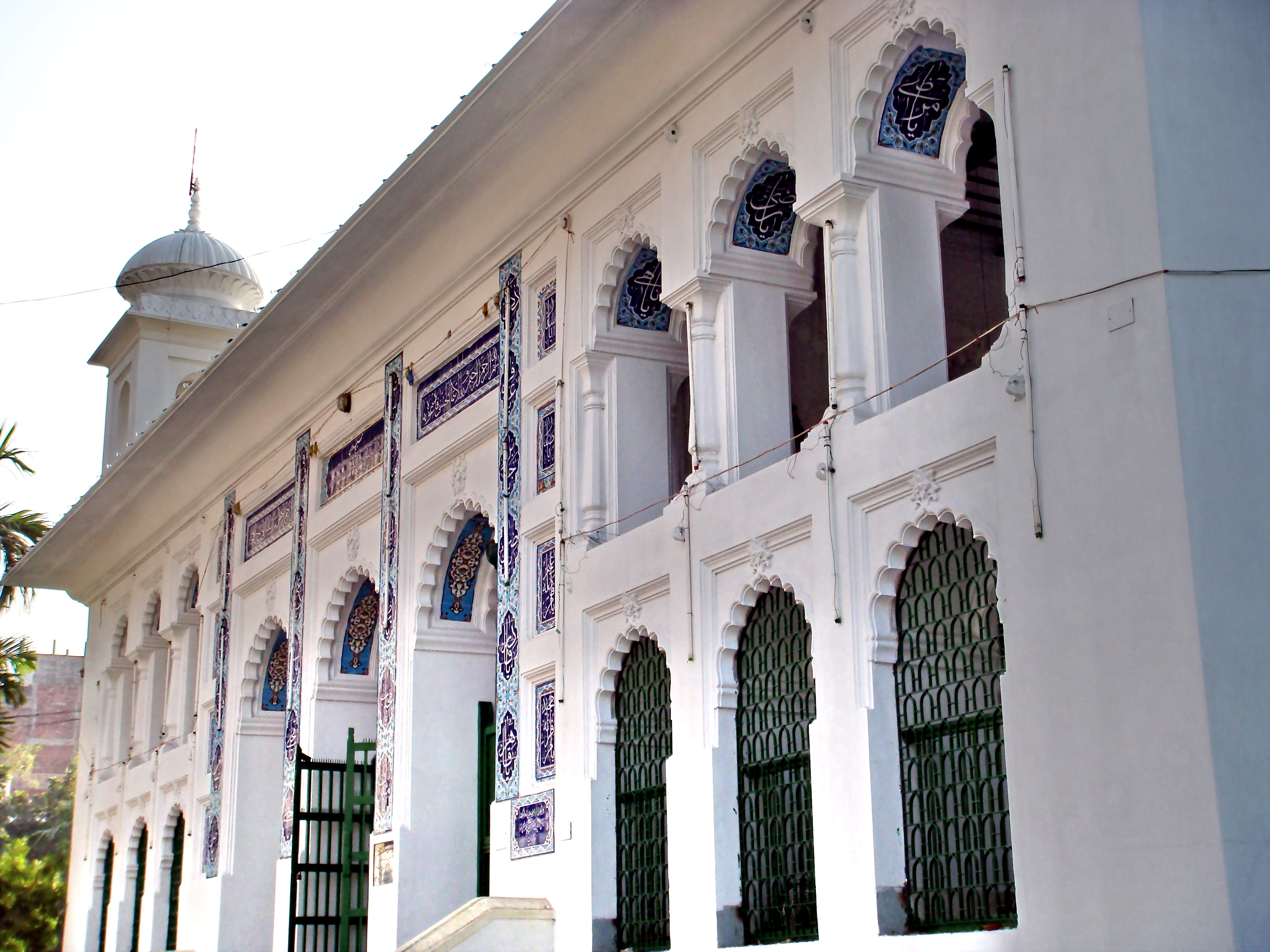
Side view

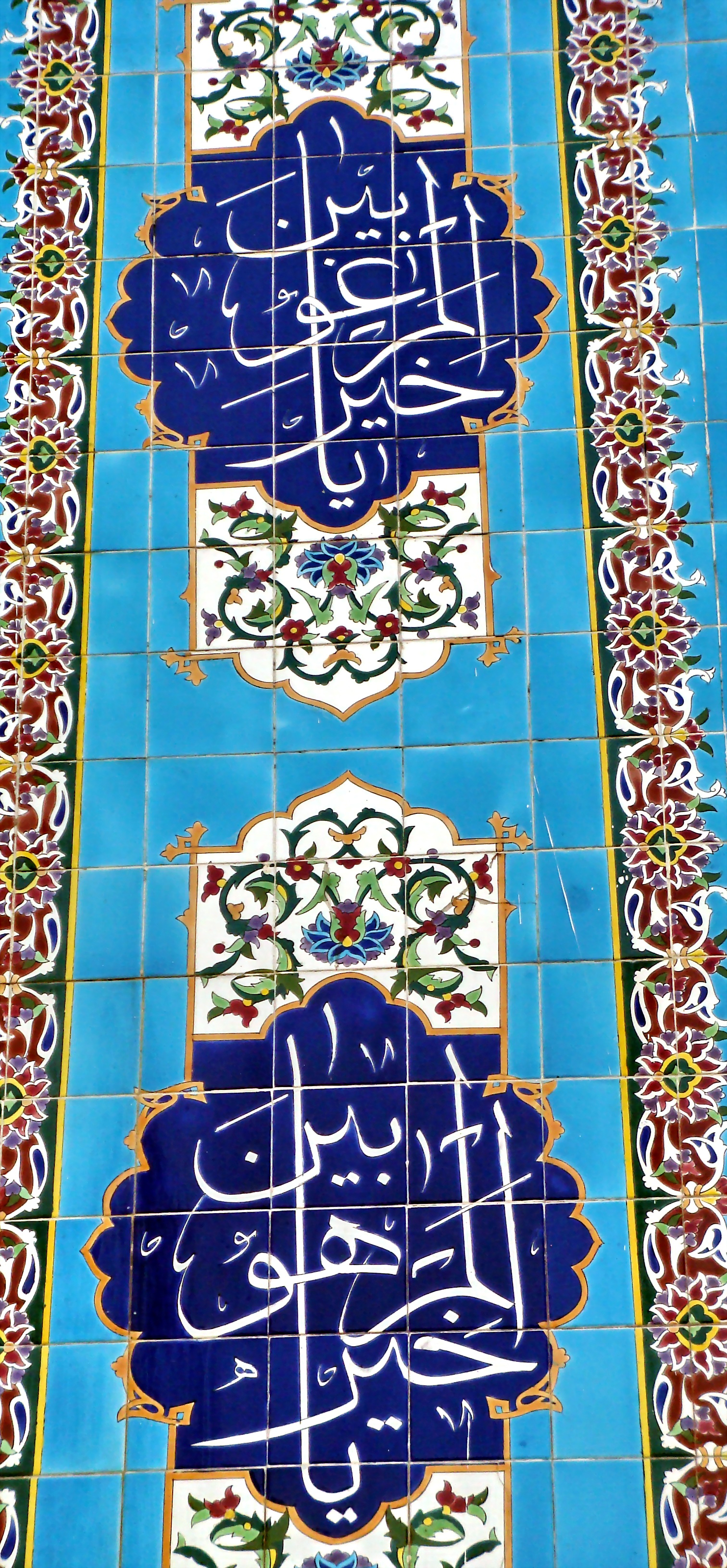
Calligraphy on the walls

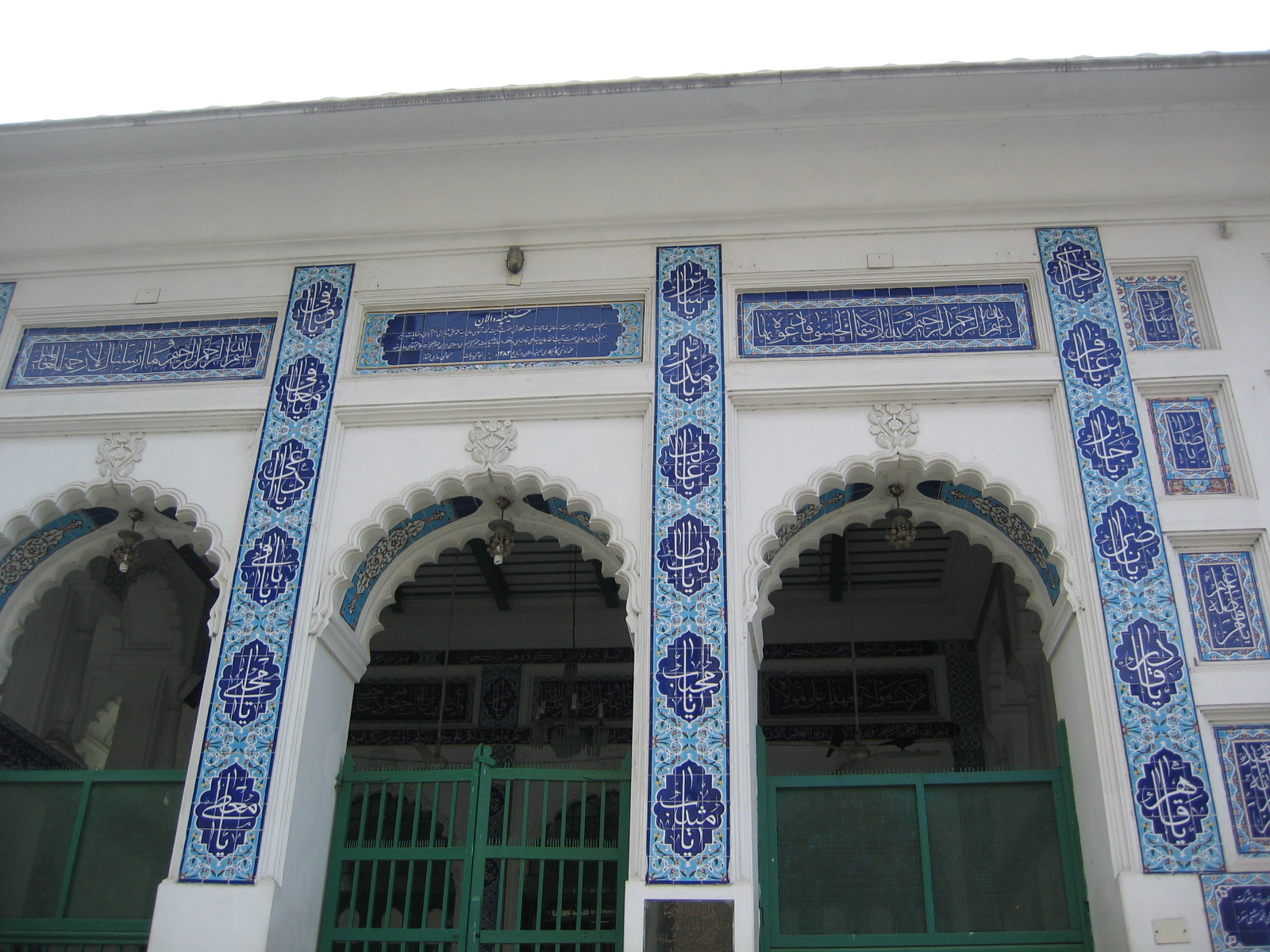
Islamic Calligraphy on the north face

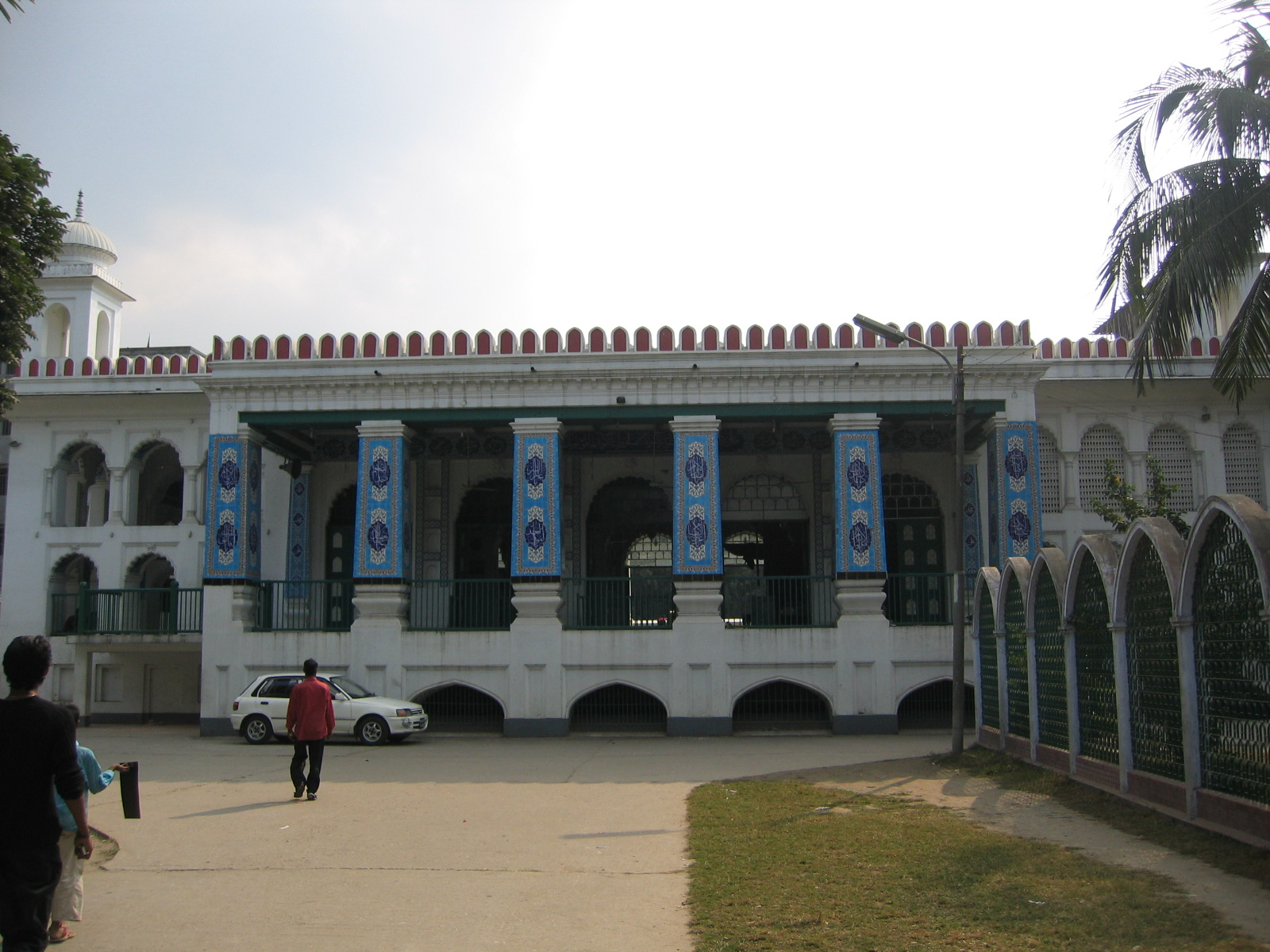
Front (north) face

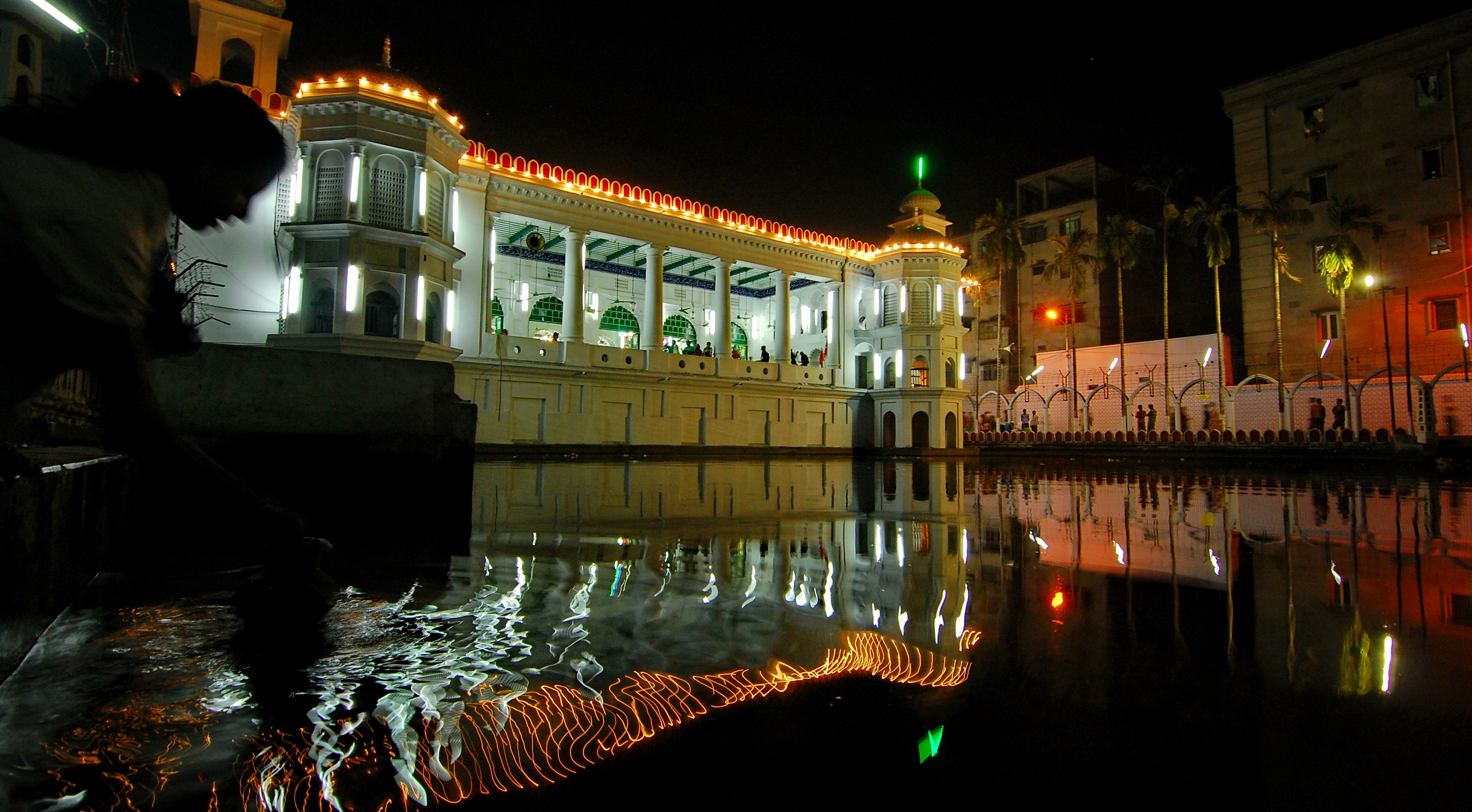
At Muharram Night

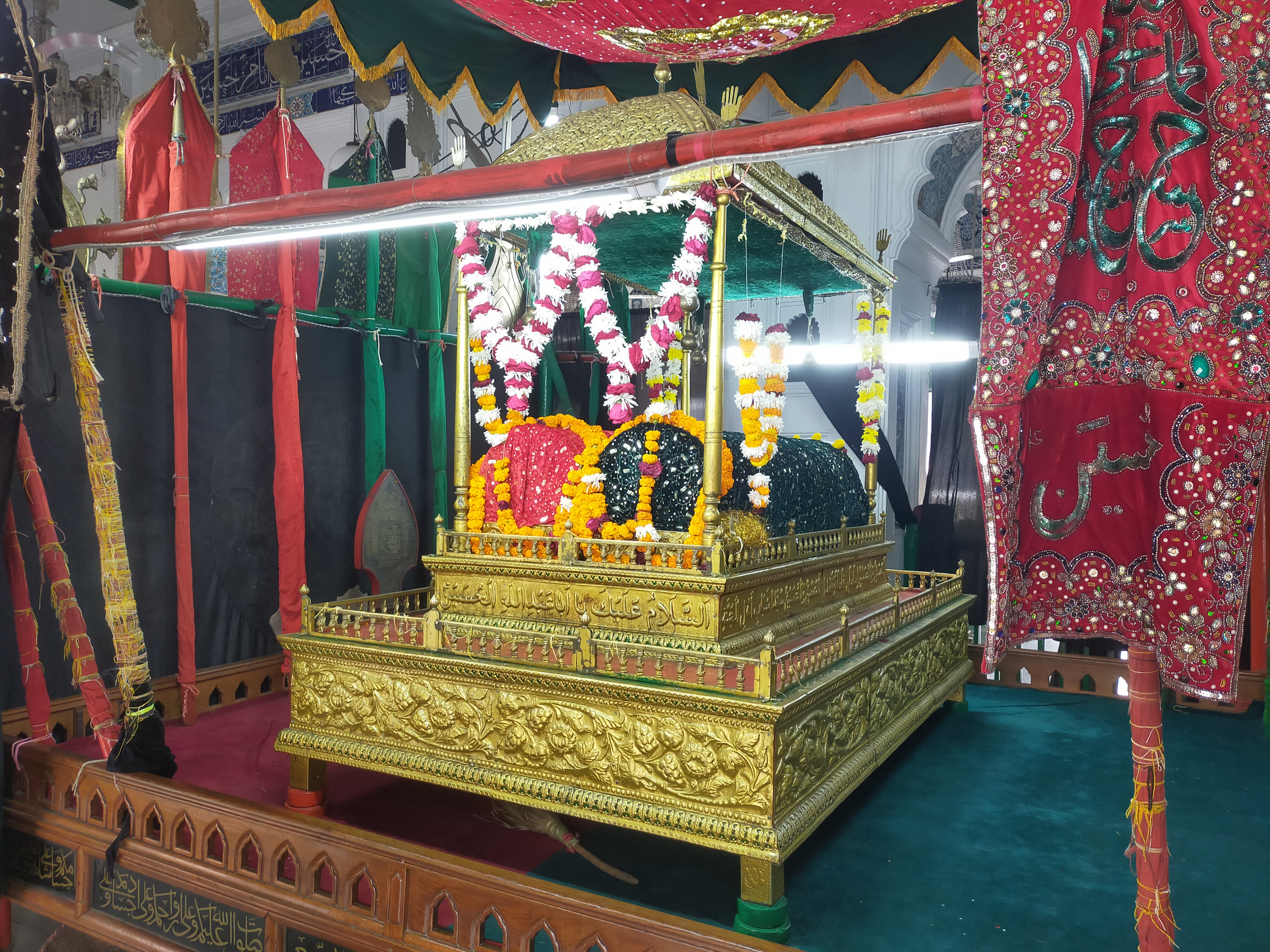
A Tazia inside the Hussaini Dalan

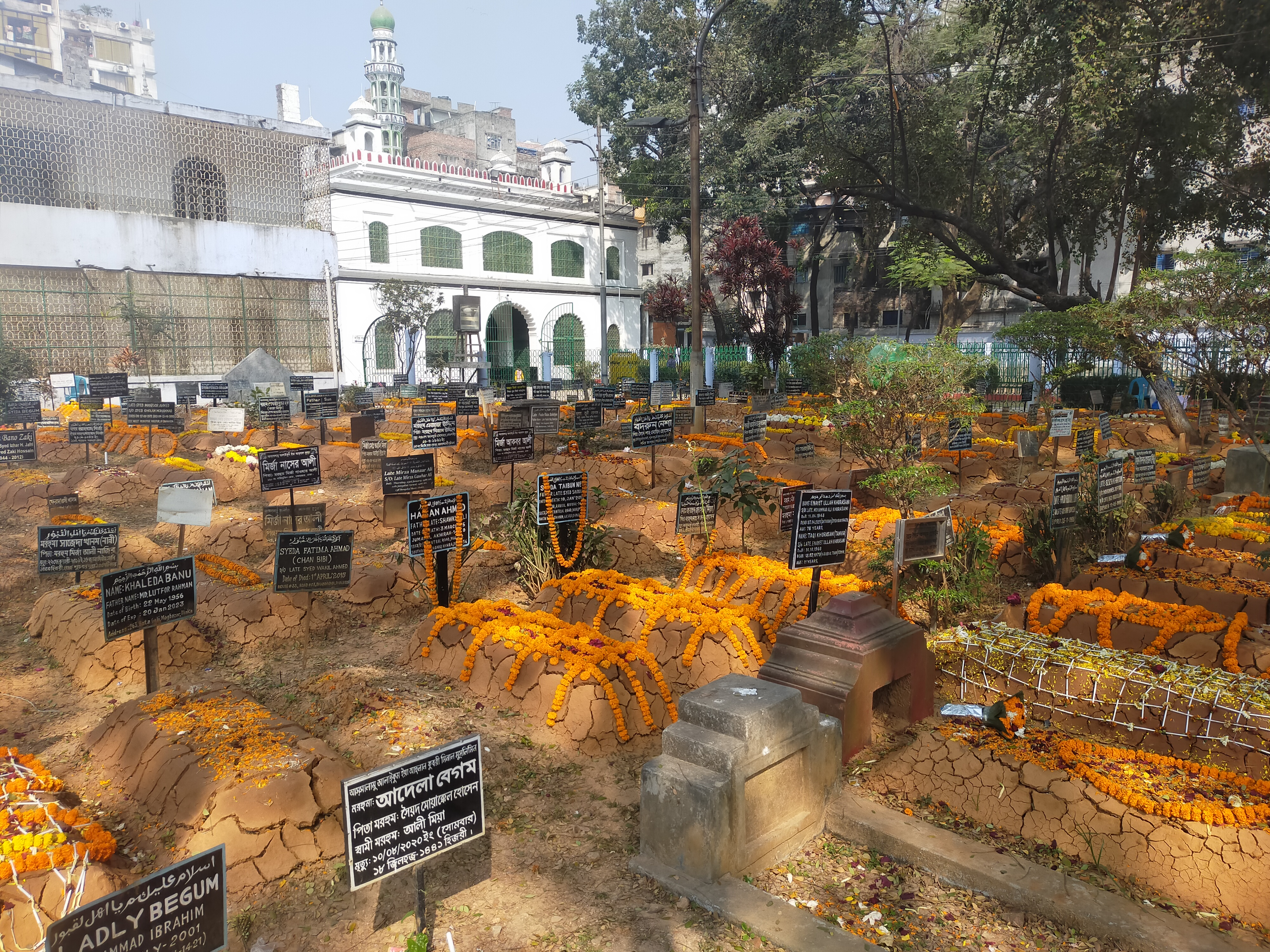
Graveyard in the Hussaini Dalan premises

== See also ==
- Architecture of Bengal
- Shia Islam in Bangladesh
- Shia Islam in India

== Bibliography ==
- Ahmed, N. (1984). Discover the monuments of Bangladesh. Dhaka: University Press Limited. (pp. 180–181).
- Sayed, H. M. (1980). Muslim Monuments of Bangladesh. Dhaka: Islamic Foundation,(p. 58).
- Asher, Catherine, B. (1984). Inventory of Key Monuments. Art and Archaeology Research Papers: The Islamic Heritage of Bengal. Paris: UNESCO.(p. 56).
- Shiraji, M. M. (2006). Hussaini Dalan 2006. (n.d) Retrieve from: www.hussainidalan.com.
