= Colombo Plan =

Economic and social development IGO (est 1951)

Colombo Plan for Cooperative Economic and Social Development in Asia and the Pacific
- Flag of the Colombo Plan

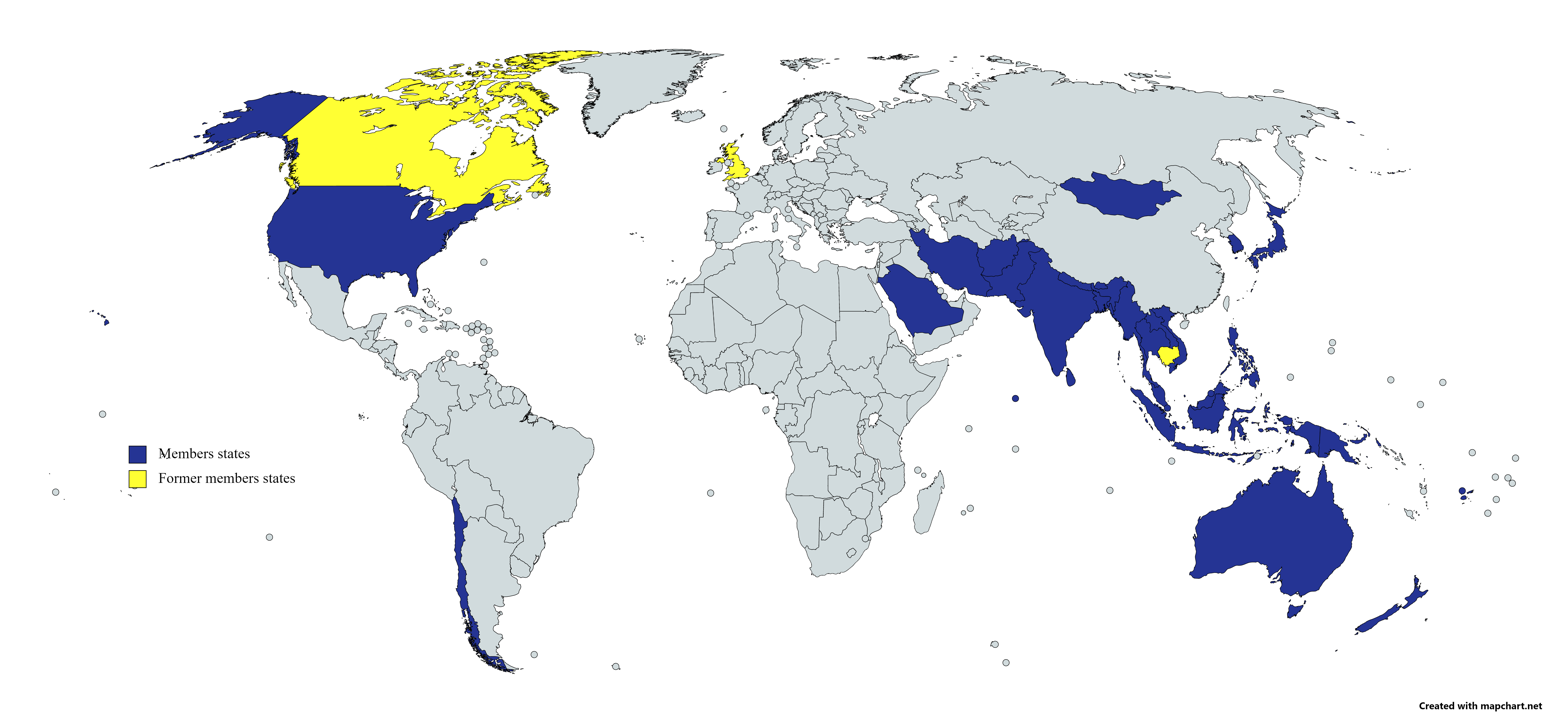
- Current (blue) and former (yellow) members of the Colombo Plan.
- Headquarters: Colombo, Sri Lanka
- Official languages: English
- Type: Economic forum
- Member countries: Current (29): Afghanistan; Australia; Bangladesh; Bhutan; Brunei; Chile; Congo; Fiji; India; Indonesia; Iran; Japan; Laos; Malaysia; Maldives; Mongolia; Myanmar; Nepal; New Zealand; Pakistan; Papua New Guinea; Philippines; Rwanda; Saudi Arabia; Singapore; South Korea; Sri Lanka; Thailand; Vietnam; Former (5): Cambodia; Canada; South Vietnam; United Kingdom; United States

Leaders
  - Secretary-General: (Philippines) Chulamanee Chartsuwan

Establishment
  - Establishment^{a}: 1 July 1951
  - Commencement: 1 July 1951
- Website https://colombo-plan.org/
- 1. As the "Colombo Plan for Co-operative Economic Development in South and South-East Asia".

The Colombo plan is a regional intergovernmental organization that began operations on 1 July 1951. The organization was conceived at an international conference, The Commonwealth Conference on Foreign Affairs held in Colombo, Ceylon (now Sri Lanka) in January 1950, and was attended by the finance ministers of Australia, the United Kingdom, Canada, Ceylon, Pakistan and New Zealand, and the prime ministers of Ceylon and India. Membership has expanded significantly over the years to the current 26 governments.

The primary focus of its work is on the development of human resources in the south and southeast regions of Asia. Aid to education 1950 to 1983 came to $72 billion, of which $41 billion came from the United States. United States withdrew from the Colombo Plan in January 2026.

== History ==
In the winter of 1949/1950, the United States, United Kingdom and other Commonwealth members discussed ideas related to economic development plans in South and Southeast Asia. The key meeting for establishing the Colombo Plan was held in Colombo, Ceylon in January 1950 at the Commonwealth Conference on Foreign Affairs.

== Host country of the Colombo Plan ==
The Colombo Plan enjoys a host country agreement with the Government of Sri Lanka in the form of a memorandum of understanding with privileges and immunities that are afforded by the Government of Sri Lanka.

In a speech made in Colombo on 5 July 2010, the 4th Secretary-General Dato' Patricia Yoon-Moi Chia said: "The gearing up of the level of our activities is made possible through the voluntary contributions of member countries and international agencies such as OPEC fund. Last year our programming was over US$10 million and we expect a more than US$12 million programming this year with almost another US$2 million in terms of cost-sharing from our member countries. With funding from the United States Government and 13 other member countries, the Colombo Plan is now the biggest stakeholder in drug demand reduction in the Asia-Pacific, with a special initiative in Afghanistan."

== Programmes ==
The Colombo Plan has four programmes:

- Drug Advisory Programme (DAP, estd: 1973)
- Gender Affairs Programme (GAP, estd: 2014)
- Programme for Environment & Climate Change (ENV, estd: 2016)
- Capacity Building Programme (CBP)

== Past Programmes ==
- Long-Term Scholarships Programme (LTSP, estd: 1951)
- Programme for Private Sector Development (PPSD, estd: 1995)
- Programme for Public Administration & Environment (PPA, estd: 1995)

== The Plan now ==
Over the years, while adhering to the concept of human resource development and South-South Cooperation in addressing issues of economic and social development, the programme content of the Colombo Plan has been changing to take account of the needs of member countries in a fast changing world economic environment. In the early years, the training programmes were more of a long-term nature, while recent programmes have been focusing on providing advanced skills and experience sharing aimed at arriving at the best practices in different fields of economic and social activities as a means of good policy making and governance. The current programmes of the Colombo Plan are in the areas of public policy formulation in an environment of globalisation and market economy, private sector development as a prime mover for growth, drug use and dependence prevention and treatment in member countries and addressing gender issues. The Colombo Plan Staff College for Technician Education located in Manila also provides skill development opportunities for technicians in middle level.

In her 2010 speech, Dato' Patricia Yoon-Moi Chia states: "The current Colombo Plan looks very different since our restructuring and revitalisation in 1995. As we continue to build upon our past successes, the new Colombo Plan uses cooperation among developing member countries or South-south Cooperation between the developed member countries and developing member countries, to underpin all our activities. Since our restructuring in 1995, we have now provided 16,082 scholarships to 23 member countries for both long-term and short-term training programmes."

== Past secretaries-general ==
The Colombo Plan underwent an organisational transformation and renewal in 1995, and the Colombo Plan Bureau became the Colombo Plan Secretariat to be headed by the Secretary-General, instead of a Director. The first Secretary-General was Dr. Kim Hak-su from Korea (January 1995 – March 1999) who was succeeded by Dr. Sarat Chandran, India (April 1999 – June 2003), Mr. Kittipan Kanjanapitkul from Thailand (June 2003 – August 2007), Dato' Patricia Yoon-Moi Chia from Malaysia (August 2007 – August 2011), the first Asian woman to hold this position, Mr. Adam Maniku from Maldives (15 August 2011 – November 2013), Mr. Kinley Dorji from Bhutan (May 2014 – April 2018) and, Ambassador Phan Kieu Thu (May 2018 - December 2021). The incumbent Secretary-General, Dr. Benjamin P. Reyes from The Philippines assumed duties on 1 May 2022 as the organisation's 8th Secretary-General. In July 2026, H. E. Chulamanee Chartsuwan succeeded Dr. Reyes as the organisation's 9th Secretary-General.

== Notable Colombo Plan scholars ==
- Dr. Ahmad Rafi, Dr. Rafi was a prominent Nuclear Chemist who obtained his MSc from Edinburgh University (1964) and his PhD from University of Newcastle Upon Tyne (1969). Dr. Rafi helped to develop and promote nuclear energy in the United States.
- Dr Sanduk Ruit (Nepal), founder, Himalayan Cataract Project and Tilganga Eye Hospital, Kathmandu.
- Dr. Baburam Bhattarai (Nepal), former Maoist rebel and Prime Minister of Nepal.
- Ong Teng Cheong (Singapore), fifth President of Singapore, former Deputy Prime Minister in Singapore.
- Karunasena Kodituwakku (Sri Lanka), former Cabinet Minister of Sri Lanka, Former Ambassador of Sri Lanka.
- Khaw Boon Wan (Singapore), former Cabinet Minister in Singapore.
- Raymond Lim (Singapore), former Cabinet Minister in Singapore.
- Yeo Cheow Tong (Singapore), former Cabinet Minister in Singapore.
- S. Iswaran (Singapore), former Cabinet Minister in Singapore.
- Mah Bow Tan (Singapore), former Cabinet Minister in Singapore.
- Dato' Hajji Abdul Ghani Bin Othman (Malaysia), former Chief Minister of Johor state in Malaysia.
- Prof. Datuk Dr. Mazlan Othman, astrophysicist, Director of the United Nations Office for Outer Space Affairs.
- Tan Sri Datuk Seri Panglima Joseph Pairin Kitingan (Malaysia), Deputy Chief Minister and Minister of Rural Development of Sabah.
- Dr. K.V. Thiruvengadam (India), Indian physician and medical teacher.
- Mapatunage James "M. J." Perera (Sri Lanka), he made broadcasting history by being the first Ceylonese Director General of Radio Ceylon, the oldest radio station in South Asia, taking over the helm from John Lampson of the BBC.
- Livy Wijemanne (Sri Lanka), pioneer of Radio Ceylon.
- J. Soedjati Djiwandono, Indonesian political scientist and founder of the Centre for Strategic and International Studies in Jakarta.
- Chellapilla Venkata Rao, (1910–1971) Indian botanist, who worked extensively on Proteaceae, and plant embryology. He taught and worked at Andhra University. (Colombo plan scholar at University of Tasmania from 1955 to 1957).
- Boediono (Indonesia), 11th Indonesia Vice President.
- Pehin Sri Adenan Bin Haji Satem (Malaysia), former Chief Minister of Sarawak
- Ananda Krishnan, Malaysian-Tamil businessman

== Present members ==
The Colombo Plan currently has 27 members.

Member economy	Date of accession
Afghanistan	1963
Australia	1951
Bangladesh	1972
Bhutan	1962
Brunei	2008
Chile	2021
Fiji	1972
India	1951
Indonesia	1953
Iran	1966
Japan	1954
South Korea	1962
Laos	1951
Malaysia	1957
Maldives	1963
Mongolia	2004
Myanmar	1952
Nepal	1952
New Zealand	1951
Pakistan	1951
Papua New Guinea	1973
Philippines	1954
Saudi Arabia	2012
Singapore	1966
Sri Lanka	1951
Thailand	1954
Vietnam	2004

== Past members ==
There have been four past members of the Colombo Plan including two founding members in 1950, Canada and the United Kingdom. South Vietnam and Cambodia joined together in 1951. On 2 Jul 1976 South Vietnam was succeeded by the Socialist Republic of Vietnam which withdrew in 1978. Vietnam was a provisional member from 5 Nov 2001 to 18 Nov 2003 until it was accepted as a full member in 2004.

On 7 January 2026, President Donald Trump ordered the withdrawal of United States from 66 international organisations including the Colombo Plan.

Member economy	Date of accession	Date of deposition
Canada	1950	1992
United Kingdom	1950	1991
Cambodia	1951	1975
South Vietnam	1951	1975
Greece	1957	1979
Tanzania	1962	1964
Italy	1962	1964
United States	1951	2026

== See also ==
- Colombo Plan Staff College
