= Federation of Bangladesh Chambers of Commerce & Industries =

Business trade body of Bangladesh

Federation of Bangladesh Chambers of Commerce and Industries
- বাংলাদেশ শিল্প ও বণিক সমিতি
- Seal of FBCCI
- Abbreviation: FBCCI
- Formation: 1973; 53 years ago
- Headquarters: 60 Motijheel, Dhaka, Bangladesh
- Region served: Bangladesh
- Administrator: Hafizur Rahman
- Website: fbcci.org

Federation of Bangladesh Chambers of Commerce and Industries (FBCCI; Bengali: বাংলাদেশ শিল্প ও বণিক সমিতি) is the apex trade organization of Bangladesh playing consultative and advisory role in safeguarding the interests of the private sector in the country.

== History ==
The Federation of Bangladesh Chambers of Commerce and Industry was established in 1973 under the Trade Organization Ordinance, 1961 and Companies Act, 1913.

== Structure ==
=== Board of directors ===
The Ministry of Commerce dissolved the FBCCI board of directors and on 11 September 2024 appointed Hafizur Rahman, a former additional secretary and member of the Bangladesh Competition Commission, as the administrator of the FBCCI pending the election of a new board.

=== Division of work ===
1. General Affairs Division
2. Membership & Legal Affairs Division
3. International Division
4. Research Division
5. Trade & Finance Division
6. PR & Protocols Division
7. SME & Price Monitoring Division

=== Member bodies ===
- Chambers of Commerce and Industry
  - A Class Chamber - 60
  - B Class Chamber - 19
- Trade and Industrial Association
  - A Class Association - 372
  - B Class Association - 05
- Joint Chamber (with Foreign Countries) - 20

== Members ==
Members of the FBCCI are District Chambers, Regional Chambers, Associations, bilateral and national industry associations.

== International links ==
International Linkages FBCCI maintains close relations with Trade and Industrial Associations and other mercantile and public bodies abroad. FBCCI is the member of different international bodies, such as International Chamber of Commerce (ICC), Islamic Chamber of Commerce and Industry (ICCI), Confederation of Asia-Pacific Chambers of Commerce and Industry (CACCI), and the SAARC Chamber of Commerce and Industry (SAARC CCI). FBCCI also interacts with various international economic and trade promotion organizations including UNDP, ESCAP, UNIDO, ITC, GATT-UNCTAD. To safeguard and protect the interest of business community in the international arena, FBCCI maintains close communication with these International Organizations.FBCCI is the chair of the BCIM (Bangladesh-China-India-Myanmar) Business Council.

The Federation of FBCCI has Joint Chambers/Co-operation Agreement with the national trade organizations of a good number of countries including Australia, Belarus, Belgium, Bhutan, Brazil, Cambodia, Canada, China, Czech Republic, Finland, France, Germany, Georgia, Hong Kong, India, Indonesia, Iran, Italy, Japan, Republic of Korea, Kuwait, Malaysia, Morocco, Myanmar, Nepal, Netherlands, Oman, Pakistan, Peru, Philippine, Qatar, Romania, Russian Federation, Saudi Arabia, Singapore, South Africa, Sri Lanka, Syria, Taiwan, Thailand, Turkey, UAE, Uganda, Ukraine, USA, Uzbekistan & Vietnam.

== See also ==
- Chittagong Chamber of Commerce & Industry
- Dhaka Chamber of Commerce & Industry
- Iran-Bangladesh Chamber of Commerce & Industry
