= Bhola Polytechnic Institute =

Government polytechnic institute of Bangladesh

Coordinates: 22°29′36″N 90°43′55″E

- Type: Government Polytechnic Institute
- Established: 2005
- Accreditation: Institution of Diploma Engineers, Bangladesh
- Principal: Mir Monjur Morshed.
- Students: 1200+
- Location: Borhanuddin Upazila, Bhola, Bangladesh
- Campus: urban 3 acres (1.2 ha)
- Affiliations: Bangladesh Technical Education Board
- Website: www.bhpi.gov.bd

Bhola Polytechnic Institute (Bengali: ভোলা পলিটেকনিক ইনস্টিটিউট) or BhPI is a government polytechnic Institute located at Bhola, the largest Island of Bangladesh. It was established in 2005 with four departments. It now offers 4-year Diploma in Engineering courses in each department.

== Location ==
Bhola Polytechnic Institute is located at Bhorhanuddin Upazila of Bhola District. This Institute is 25 kilometres (16 mi) south from the Bhola city and adjacent to the Bhola-Charfasion highway.

== Departments and seats ==
There are seven technologies/departments. They are:

1. Civil technology - 200
2. Computer technology - 100
3. Electronics technology - 100
4. Refrigeration and air condition technology - 100
