= Dhaka Chamber of Commerce & Industry =

Bangladeshi non-profit organization

Dhaka Chamber of Commerce & Industry (DCCI)
- ঢাকা শিল্প ও বণিক সমিতি
- Founded: 1958
- Type: Non-profit organization
- Legal status: Association
- Purpose: Business
- Location: Dhaka, Bangladesh
- Coordinates: 23.728063°N 90.419591°E
- Origins: Dhaka
- Region served: Bangladesh
- Services: Charitable services for business
- Key people: Ashraf Ahmed (President)
- Website: dhakachamber.com

Dhaka Chamber of Commerce & Industry (DCCI), established in 1958, is a large organization for businesspeople in Dhaka, Bangladesh.

== History ==
Dhaka Muslim Chamber of Commerce and Industry (1936) and the United Chamber of Commerce and Industry (1947) merged in 1959 to form the Dhaka Chamber of Commerce and Industry.

== International affiliations ==
DCCI has affiliations with various international organizations like UNDP, UNCTAD, WTO, ITC, ESCAP, UNIDO, USAID, CBI, World Bank, ICC, GTZ, JICA, ZDH, APO, IFC-BICF, JETRO, CIPE, SEDF, WCC, CCPIT.

== DCCI Business Institute (DBI) ==
DCCI established a business institute named "DCCI Business Institute" (DBI) in 1999. DBI is fully controlled by a research-oriented professional body.

== See also ==
- FBCCI
- Chittagong Chamber of Commerce & Industry
