= Bangladesh–Iran relations =

Bilateral relations between the nations of Bangladesh and Iran

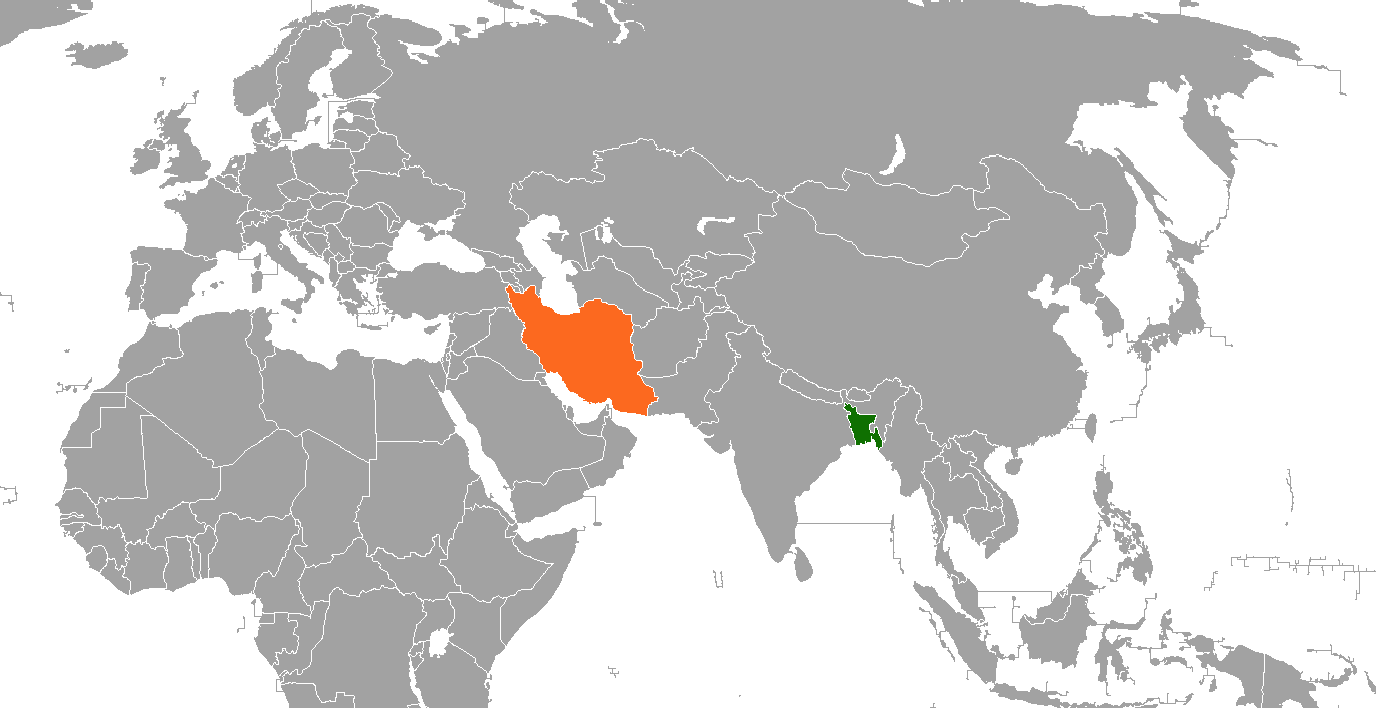

- Bangladesh: Iran

Diplomatic mission
- High Commission of Bangladesh, Tehran: Embassy of Iran, Dhaka

Envoy
- High Commissioner: Ambassador Jalil Rahimi Jahanabadi

The People's Republic of Bangladesh and the Islamic Republic of Iran maintain bilateral relations. Bangladesh maintains an embassy in Tehran and Iran also maintains an embassy in Dhaka. Both are Muslim-majority countries and maintain close cultural and religious ties. Apart from the United Nations, both nations are members of the OIC and the Developing 8.

Relations between Persia and the region of Bengal date back at least to the Muslim conquest of Bengal. The Bengal Sultanate was a stronghold for Iranian immigrants in South Asia. Persian culture, language and literature deeply impacted their Bengali counterparts during the medieval period.

Although Imperial Iran supported Pakistan during the Bangladesh Liberation War, relations greatly improved following the Iranian Revolution. Since then, leaders of both nations have made state visits and counter visits. Bangladesh has supported Iran's nuclear program.

Despite not having any major deals or significant trade, the representatives of both nations have called for expanding bilateral economic relations. Apart from trade, both nations also cooperate in the energy sector and counter-terrorism.

== History ==
=== Medieval period ===
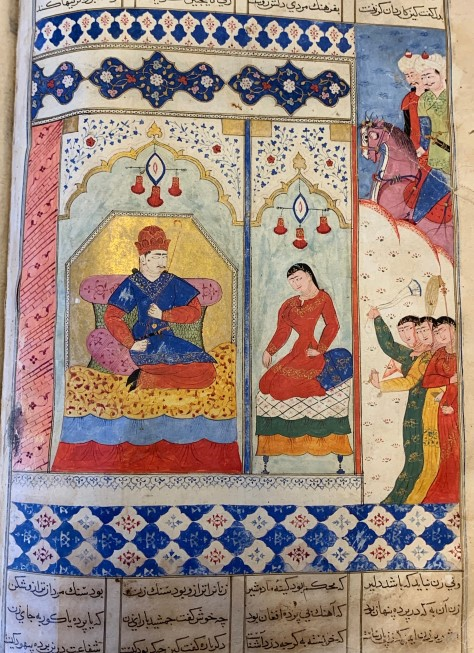
A Sharaf-Nama manuscript that was owned by the Sultan of Bengal, Nasiruddin Nasrat Shah. It shows Alexander sharing his throne with Queen Nushabah.

Many Iranians migrated to Bengal throughout history in search of employment as well as to propagate Islam. Baba Kotwal Isfahani was among the first recorded Iranians to migrate from the Khwarazmian Empire to Bengal in 1204, arriving as an acquaintance of the Turco-Persian military ruler Bakhtiyar Khalji during his conquest of the region.

The Bengal Sultanate was a stronghold for Iranian immigrants. With Persian as an official language, Bengal witnessed an influx of Persian scholars, lawyers, teachers and clerics. During the reign of Ghiyasuddin Azam Shah, Sonargaon became an important centre of Persian literature, with many publications of prose and poetry. Described as the "golden age of Persian literature in Bengal", its stature is illustrated by the Sultan's correspondence with Persian poet Hafez. When the Sultan invited Hafez to complete an incomplete ghazal by the ruler, the poet responded by acknowledging the grandeur of the Sultan's court and the literary quality of Bengali-Persian poetry.

Emperor Shah Rukh of Persia had diplomatic relations with the Sultan of Bengal Jalaluddin Muhammad Shah. Emperor Shah Rukh contributed to ending the 5-year long Bengal–Jaunpur War after pressuring the Sultan of Jaunpur Ibrahim Sharqi to abstain from attacking Bengal "or to take the consequence upon himself. To which the intimation of the Jaunpur ruler was obedient, and desisted from his attacks upon Bengal".

=== Modern era ===
==== Bangladesh Liberation War ====
Iran was concerned with the imminent break-up of Pakistan which, it feared, would have caused the state to fractionalise into small pieces, ultimately resulting in Iran's encirclement by rivals. In December 1971, US President Richard Nixon encouraged Iran to send military supplies to Pakistan. After many of the PAF jets being defeated, the PAF aircraft that survived decided to take refuge at Iranian air bases, refusing to continue fighting.

==== Post-revolution Iran ====
With the Iranian Revolution in 1979, new dimensions were added to the relationship between the newly proclaimed Islamic Republic of Iran and Bangladesh. Relations gradually grew further with Iranian President Hashemi Rafsanjani becoming the first Iranian leader to visit independent Bangladesh in 1995. Subsequently, Bangladeshi Prime Minister Sheikh Hasina also visited Iran and held talks with President Mohammed Khatami. The government of the Iranian President Mahmoud Ahmadinejad sought to deepen ties between the two states, with Iranian investment in Bangladeshi industry. Bangladesh has also supported Iranian nuclear program, saying it is for peaceful purposes.

Bangladesh voted against the United Nations resolution Situation of Human Rights in the Islamic Republic of Iran on 19 December 2001 raised in response to the Persecution of Baháʼís in Iran. Iran assisted Bangladesh with relief package after the Cyclone Sidr hit Bangladesh in 2007.

Bangladesh and Iran signed a preferential trade accord in July 2006 which removed non-tariff barriers, with a view to eventually establishing a free trade agreement. Before the signing of the accord, bilateral trade between the countries amounted to US$100 million annually.

In mid-2007, the Bangladeshi government requested Iran's help in the construction of a nuclear power plant in Bangladesh, in order to offset the decline in the availability of gas for power generation. Bangladeshi Minister of Power, Energy and Natural Resources also requested Iranian assistance for the construction of new oil refineries in Bangladesh.

Bangladeshi Ministry of Foreign Affairs strongly condemned Israel's military attack on Iran during the 2025 Twelve-Day War, calling it a violation of international law and a threat to global peace, and urged both sides to show restraint.

At the beginning of the 2026 Iran war, following the Israeli–US joint strikes on Iran on 28 February and Iranian retaliation on the Arab states of the Persian Gulf, the Bangladesh Foreign Ministry issued a statement expressing deep concern over the safety of Bangladeshis in the Middle East, condemning Iran's retaliatory strikes as "violation of sovereignty" of Gulf countries. The statement was domestically criticized as "one-sided" for not condemning Israel and the US. The following day, the ministry issued another statement expressing "deep sorrow" over the assassination of Ali Khamenei, the Supreme Leader of Iran, by calling it a "violation of international law and norms."

== Trade relations ==
Bangladesh and Iran signed an MoU on signing a bilateral trade agreement at the meeting held on 20 February 2001. Besides, there is a preferential trade agreement or PTA signed in 2006 between the two countries which has remained not functional for last nine years.

The proposed joint council deal is expected to increase Bangladesh's export to Iran as the latter has good demand of jute and jute goods.

"Bangladesh government also plans to provide some trade facilities to exporters to Iran. The issue will be discussed with the Iranian authorities", said an official. Of the MoUs, an MoU will be signed on the import of wheat from Iran, officials said. An MoU on agriculture sector signed at the 2013 meeting will be extended till 2020.

About the PTA, officials said the countries have failed to settle dispute of rules of origin of products in last nine years of signing of the agreement, which has non functional but a Chamber of Commerce established on 2017, Iran - Bangladesh Chamber of Commerce & Industry

Meanwhile, Iran asked Bangladesh to regularly pay installments of a loan taken from the country in the 1980s. An ERD letter sent to foreign affairs ministry recently cited the development. Bangladesh took the loan to construct Ashuganj Fertiliser and Chemical Company Ltd., but later faced problems in continuing the repayment of installments after the sanction was imposed on Iran in 2006.

== Counter-terrorism ==
Bangladesh and Iran discussed in possible cooperation in the area of fighting against extremism. "We discussed the possibility of common joint cooperation on extremism and we will look into the exact details of how we can do that", visiting Iranian Foreign Minister Javed Zarif said at a press briefing at Hotel Sonargaon on 16 September 2017. He had official talks with his Bangladesh counterpart AH Mahmood Ali and courtesy call on President Abdul Hamid and Prime Minister Sheikh Hasina. Previously, both nations joined the war on terror.

== Oil development ==
Eastern Refinery Limited, one of the major oil refineries in Bangladesh, was built with assistance from Iran.

== See also ==
- Shia Islam in Bangladesh
- Foreign relations of Bangladesh
- Foreign relations of Iran
