= Ceramic heat cell =

A ceramic heat cell, also known as Caloric Porous Structure Cell (CPSC), is a ceramic device to burn a fuel without flame, converting the thermal energy to mechanical work. In principle any fuel that can be vapourised and pre-mixed with air can be used. "Ultra vaporized steam" replaces the exploding air/fuel mixture as the work medium. The flameless combustion keeps emissions of hydrocarbons, carbon monoxide, and nitrous oxides extremely low. Exhaust gas can be recirculated, which further reduces emissions.

A ceramic heat cell made by German firm Enginion is claimed to generate up to 30 megawatts of power per cubic meter, operating at a moderate temperature of 1200 °C, with output varying from 5% to 100% of this, responding in 5 milliseconds. Emissions are claimed to be well below 10 parts per million even without exhaust gas recirculation. A glow plug is used to start the cell.
