= Colombo Plan Staff College =

International organisation

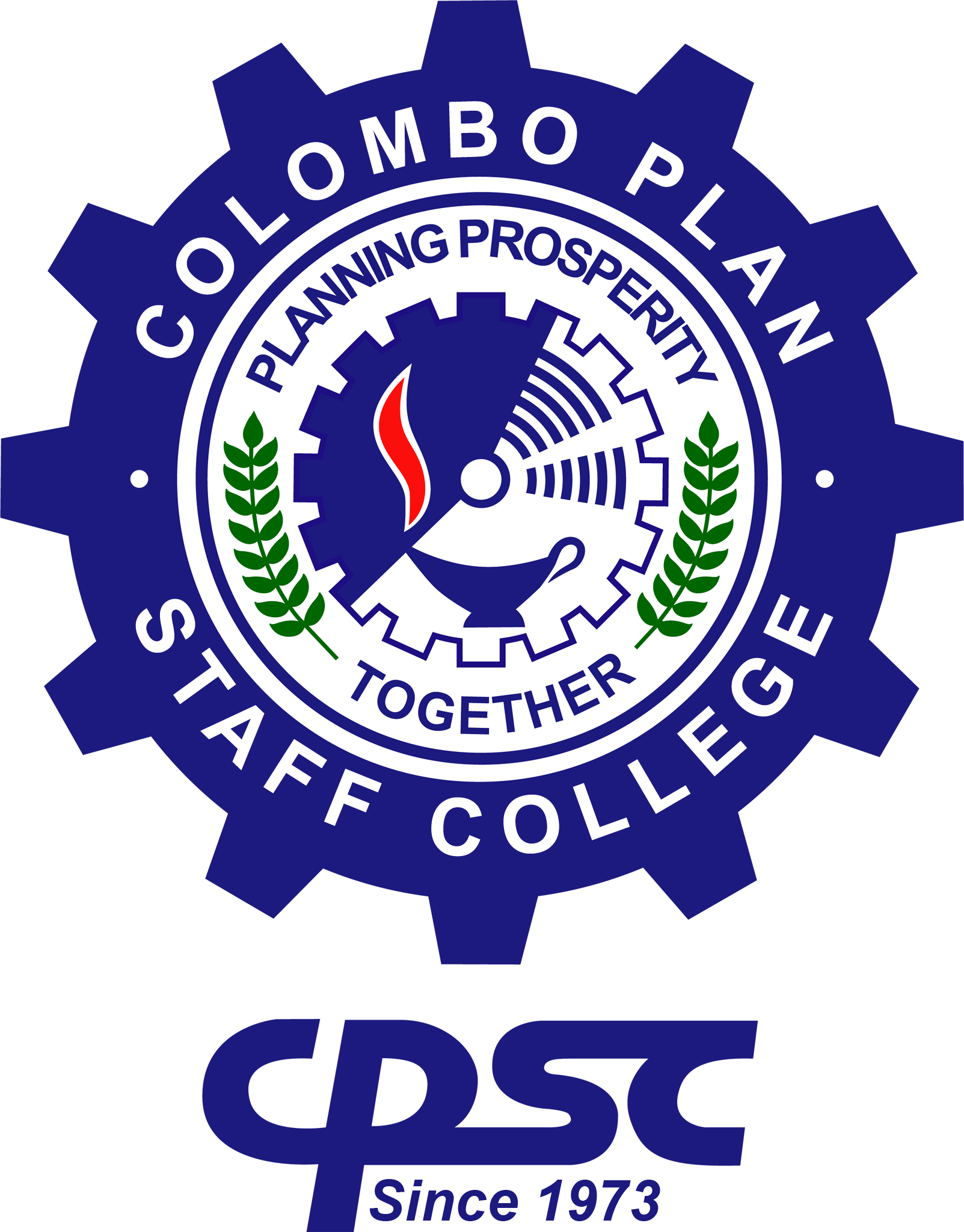
CPSC Logo

The Colombo Plan Staff College for Technician Education (CPSC) is a regional inter-governmental organisation in Asia Pacific region mandated to enhance Vocational Education and Training in its member countries.

CPSC is a specialised agency of the Colombo Plan.

== History ==
Responding to the need to improve the quality of technician education and training, the Member Governments of the Colombo Plan considered the recommendation of the Singapore Colloquium in May 1969 to establish a Regional Center for Technician Teacher Training. Adopted during the 20th Consultative Committee Meeting in Canada in October 1969, the said recommendation was firmed up into a feasibility study which was conducted from March to June 1970. Results were presented during the 21st Consultative Committee Meeting (CCM), referred for Further Study and examined by a working party of experts in February 1971, October 1971 and February 1972, respectively. After a thorough scrutiny, it was finally approved during the 22nd CCM in November 1972. A Memorandum of Understanding relating to the establishment of the Colombo Plan Staff College for Technician Education (CPSC) as a regional center followed during the 23rd CCM in December 1973 held in Wellington, new Zealand.

== Member Countries ==
CPSC Member Countries in dark shade

The CPSC consists of sixteen active member countries and 12 founding member countries, amounting to a total of 26 countries.

- Afghanistan
- Bangladesh
- Bhutan
- Fiji
- India
- Malaysia
- Maldives
- Myanmar
- Mongolia
- Nepal
- Pakistan
- Papua New Guinea
- Philippines
- Singapore
- Sri Lanka
- Thailand
