= List of Bangladesh-related topics =

This article lists articles on Wikipedia that are related to Bangladesh, Bengal and Bangladesh/Bengali culture. This is so that those interested in the subject can monitor changes to the pages by clicking on Related changes in the sidebar.

== General ==
- Media of Bangladesh
- The Concert for Bangladesh
- List of beaches in Bangladesh

== Places ==
=== Historic places ===
- Bikrampur
- Mainamati
- Mosque city of Bagerhat
- Somapura Mahavihara
- Sonargaon
- Mahasthangarh
- Paharpur
- Tajhat Palace
- Sitakot Vihara

=== In Dhaka ===
- Old Dhaka
- Bailey Road, Dhaka
- Kallyanpur
- Motijheel
- Nilkhet
- Ramna Park
- Suhrawardy Udyan
- Uttara (Town)
- Gulshan Thana
- Shahbag
- Azimpur
- Dhanmondi
- Mirpur Thana
- Shewrapara
- Shantinagar, Dhaka

=== Other locations ===
- Districts of Bangladesh
- Upazilas of Bangladesh
- Unions of Bangladesh
- Ashulia
- Benapole
- Gomostapur
- Bhaluka Upazila
- Chhagalnaiya Upazila
- Chhatak
- Dohogram
- Faridpur Sadar
- Fatullah
- Grand Trunk Road
- Homna Upazila
- Jat Area
- Khoksa
- Kumarkhali
- List of islands of Bangladesh
- Patenga
- Patiya Upazila
- Sandwip
- Savar Upazila
- Tajhat
- Teknaf Upazila
- St. Martin's Island
- Madhabkunda
- Sitakunda
- Chandpur

== Politics ==
=== Government ===
- Coat of arms of Bangladesh
- East Bengal Legislative Assembly
- Jatiyo Sangshad

=== Laws ===
- Incorporated Council of Law Reporting

=== Gallantry ===
- Bir Sreshtho
- Bir Uttom
- Bir Bikrom
- Bir Protik

=== National ===
- Bangla Academy Award
- Ekushey Padak
- Independence Day Award
- National symbols of Bangladesh

== Hospitals and Clinics ==
=== Hospitals ===
- Dhaka Medical College Hospital
- Mitford Hospital, Dhaka

== Culture ==
- Architecture
- Baul
- Calendar
- Cinema
- Cuisine
- Language
- Literature
- Ghosts in Bengali culture
- Music
- Public holidays
- Sports
- Theatre
- TV and radio channels
- Weddings

== Organizations ==
=== General ===
- Bangladesh Small and Cottage Industry Corporation

=== Transports ===
- Bangladesh Railway
- Bangladesh Road Transport Corporation
- Civil Aviation Authority of Bangladesh
- Transport and communication of Bangladesh

=== Telecommunication ===
- Bangladesh Telegraph and Telephone Board

=== Cultural organisations ===
- Bangla Academy
- Bangladesh Nazrul Sena
- Bishwa Sahitya Kendra
- Chhayanaut
- Shilpakala Academy
- Shishu Academy

=== Municipal corporations ===
- Bogura City Corporation
- Barishal City Corporation
- Chittagong City Corporation
- Dhaka North City Corporation
- Dhaka South City Corporation
- Gazipur City Corporation
- Khulna City Corporation
- Mymensingh City Corporation
- Narayanganj City Corporation
- Rajshahi City Corporation
- Rangpur City Corporation
- Sylhet City Corporation

==== Former ====
- Dhaka City Corporation

=== Airlines ===
- Biman Bangladesh Airlines
- GMG Airlines
- United Airways

==== Organisations ====
- Bangladesh Computer Society
- Bangladesh Society of Microbiologists
- Bangladesh Cartoonist Association

=== NGO ===
- Acid Survivors Foundation
- ASA
- BRAC
- Blind Education and Rehabilitation Development Organisation
- Christian Commission for Development in Bangladesh
- Grameen Bank

=== Publishing ===
- Agamee Prakashani
- Muktadhara
- Sheba Prokashoni

=== Business ===
- Adamjee Jute Mills
- Beximco
- Chittagong Stock Exchange
- Dhaka Stock Exchange
- Khulna Shipyard
- Pharmaceutical industry in Bangladesh
- Bangladesh Bureau of Statistics
- Bangladesh Export Processing Zone Authority
- FBCCI
- Transcom Group
- Bangladesh Jiban Bima Corporation
- Grameen Bank
- Rahimafrooz
- List of companies of Bangladesh
- Grameen family of organizations
- Eskayef Bangladesh Limited
- Credit Rating Agency of Bangladesh Limited
- List of shopping malls in Bangladesh
- Navana Group
- Zaman Group of Industries
- Impress Telefilm Ltd

== Events ==
- Bhawal case
