= Agora Super Stores =

Bangladeshi retail superstore

Agora Limited
- Type: Private
- Industry: Retail
- Founded: 2001
- Headquarters: Bangladesh
- Area served: Dhaka, Chittagong, Savar, Narayanganj, Tangail, Rangpur, Mymensingh.
- Products: Electronics; Home improvement; Clothing; Footwear; Jewelry; Toys; Health and beauty; Pet supplies; Sporting goods and fitness; Photo finishing; Craft supplies; Party supplies; Grocery
- Owner: Brummer & Partners and Rahimafrooz Bangladesh Limited
- Number of employees: 1000+
- Parent: Brummer & Partners and Rahimafrooz Bangladesh Limited
- Divisions: Agora Dhaka; Agora Chittagong; Agora Rangpur; Agora Mymensingh; Agora Savar; Agora Narayangonj; Agora Tangail
- Website: agorasuperstores.com

Agora is a Bangladeshi retail superstore that operates a chain of hypermarkets, discount department stores, and grocery stores. Headquartered in Dhaka, Bangladesh, the company was founded by Rahimafrooz Superstores Ltd. in 2001, and it was the pioneer and largest retail-superstore in Bangladesh.

== History ==
Agora was founded in Dhaka in 2001 by Rahimafrooz Superstores Ltd of Rahimafrooz group. In 2006 Agora was fined 100 thousand taka by Mobile court over food safety. By 2008, it had 4 superstore retain branches in Dhaka. The store uses 50 thousand rural farmers and traders to supply itself. In 2011, the store opened its first branch in Chittagong. The same Agora acquired rival brand PQS in Dhaka. By 2012, Agora had 10 branches in Bangladesh.

The Agora branch in Mohammadpur was fined in 2013 and again in 2014 for selling stale vegetables. In 2015, Agora won the best retail brand award by Bangladesh Brand Forum. On 15 May 2016, Agro and other superstores closed their stores in protest overfine issued by Bangladesh Food Safety Authority for selling date expired food on 12 May 2016. The Shantinagar branch manager Monirul Islam of Agora was sentenced to 2 years imprisonment by the mobile court of Bangladesh Food Safety Authority.

=== Acquisition of Softlogic Holdings ===
Sri Lankan conglomerate Softlogic's retail holdings wing entered into an agreement on 4 March 2022 to fully acquire Agora, according to public disclosure by the Lankan conglomerate. The acquisition of a 100% stake in the company via a series of transactions would be subject to terms and conditions set out therein and receipt of regulatory approvals, Softlogic Holding PLC said in its regulatory filing in Colombo Stock Exchange. Neither Softlogic nor Agora owners disclosed the deal value. Investment banking sources, however, estimate that the amount might be something between Tk181 and Tk249 crore, citing previous events.

In January 2020, talks are being held to sell Agora to Gemcon group. Which will be named & operated as Meena Bazar in the future.

Currently, Agora expending there outlets all over the country, In February 2024, Agora Open Nikunja-1 & Banasree G block Outlet.

Agora expanding franchise business & opened there 1st Franchise outlet in Tangail

In November 2024, Agora opened there 25th outlet on Pikepara-Mirpur. Currently total 10 franchise outlet opened as 1 in Tangail, 2 in Savar, 2 in Rangpur, 1 in Mymensingh, 1 in Matuail-Dhaka, 1 in Shyamoli-Dhaka & 1 in Khilkhet-Dhaka.

Agora limited have total 38 outlets. On this, there are 28 outlets of Agora in Dhaka, 3 in Chattogram, 2 in Savar, 1 in Narayanganj, 1 in Tangail, 2 in Rangpur, and 1 in Mymensingh.
