= Cartoon People =

- Status: Active
- Founded: 2016
- Founder: Syed Rashad Imam Tanmoy
- Country of origin: Bangladesh
- Headquarters location: Dhaka, Bangladesh
- Key people: Syed Rashad Imam Tanmoy (Founder); Shahadat Hossain (Sales and Distribution Manager); Ayman (Business Development Manager)
- Publication types: Comics
- Fiction genres: fantasy, Politics, Humor
- Official website: www.cartoonpeoplecomics.com

Cartoon People is a Bangladeshi cartoon and comics initiative and creative community. It is known for supporting cartoonists, producing local comic books, and organizing art events in Bangladesh. The group also works to promote visual storytelling and creative expression among young artists. It is an independent comic book publishing house from Bangladesh. It is run by a community of cartoonists and visual storytellers. The group creates cartoons, comics, and animations to tell stories and explore new ideas. The initiative publishes comics, graphic novels, and children's books. By combining local art with international storytelling styles, Cartoon People aims to present stories from Bangladesh to readers around the world.

== History ==
Cartoon People was founded in 2016 by Bangladeshi cartoonist Syed Rashad Imam Tanmoy and other young artists as a community for people who love drawing cartoons and comics. The founders wanted to create a platform for artists to share ideas, learn new skills, and develop original art rooted in Bangladeshi culture. In 2022, Cartoon People expanded its activities by establishing Cartoon People Comics, a publishing house that produces comic books and children's books. The publishing house aims to bring Bangladeshi stories to readers both in Bangladesh and abroad.

== Activities and Community Work ==
Cartoon People carries out a range of activities to support cartoon art and artists:

- It publishes comic books, including collections of comic strips and original stories.
- The group hosts workshops, sketch sessions, and live art events to help aspiring artists improve their skills.
- Cartoon People often holds cartoon competitions and exhibitions on social and cultural themes. For example, they organised a “Cartoons for Equality” festival in 2025 that used cartoons to raise awareness about violence against women and girls, in partnership with UN Women Bangladesh and other organisations. The event included artworks, interactive installations, and discussions on gender equality.

== Publications ==
Cartoon People Comics has published various comic books, including collections edited or created by members of the group. These publications often showcase the work of local comic creators and reflect themes from everyday life and Bangladeshi culture.

== Influence ==
Over the years, Cartoon People has grown from a small circle of artists into a wider creative community. It has helped young cartoonists find audiences, engage with social issues through art, and contribute to the development of comics and visual storytelling in Bangladesh.
