= Dhaka Comics =

Bangladeshi comic book publishing house

- Status: Active
- Founded: 2013
- Founder: Mehedi Haque
- Country of origin: Bangladesh
- Headquarters location: Dhaka Comics Studios, 152/2, Green Road, Dhaka 1205, Bangladesh
- Key people: Ahsan Habib (Chief Adviser); Nasreen Sultana Mitu (Executive Editor); Mahbub Khan (Graphic Designer); Sabyasachi Chakma (Senior Comic Book Artist)
- Publication types: Comics
- Fiction genres: Horror, fantasy, Sci-fi, Folktale, Humor
- Official website: www.dhakacomics.com

Dhaka Comics is a Bangladeshi comic book publishing house established in 2013 by Mehedi Haque. The organization was founded with the goal of producing comic books that cater to Bangladeshi preferences and culture. Mehedi Haque initiated the launch of Dhaka Comics by introducing four comic titles at the Ekushey Book Fair in 2013.

== Notable titles ==
One of its most popular characters is Durjoy, an antihero created by Tauhidul Iqbal Sampad. Durjoy operates outside the boundaries of the law to combat injustice in Bangladesh, and his popularity led to the creation of a collectible action figure that was well received by fans. The popular horror series, Nihilin Club and Pishach Kahini, both of which draw from the rich mythical traditions of Bangladeshi culture. Mehedi Haque is the creator of both the series, with Adrian Anik illustrating Pishach Kahini.

In addition to its offerings for older audiences, Dhaka Comics has titles aimed at children. Among these, Asifur Rahman's Jitu ar Tee stands out, chronicling the adventures of a young boy, Jitu, and his extraterrestrial companion, Tee. The publisher has also adapted popular children's stories, including Humayun Ahmed's tales and Thakurmar Jhuli's Lalkomol ar Nilkomol, into comic form.

The publishing house also provides a platform for emerging artists and writers through its Nobin Series. Notable titles from this series include Ibrahim and Jum. Ibrahim, written by Tanjim-Ul-Islam and illustrated by Adrian Anik, tells the story of an orphaned teenager with superpowers who fights against oppression in rural Bangladesh. Jum, by Sabyasachi Chakma, follows Jumo, a teenager from Rangamati who harnesses energy from nature through meditation and becomes a target for his abilities.

The publisher has also ventured into satire with Romel Barua's Lungiman, which humorously portrays the exploits of a superhero whose power comes from his lungi. The Comics house has adapted important works of Bangladeshi literature into graphic novels. Among these adaptations, Kazi Anwar Hossain's Poncho Romancho and Dr. Muhammad Zafar Iqbal's Ruhan Ruhan have gained widespread popularity.

== Marketing ==
Dhaka Comics has participated in the Ekushey Book Fair since 2016 with a dedicated stall. In addition to their comic books, they have expanded into merchandising, offering products featuring their original characters. One notable example is Durjoy, the protagonist of an action-thriller series created by artist Touhidul Islam Sampad, who was transformed into an action figure and debuted at the 2019 Ekushey Book Fair.

In June 2020, Dhaka Comics expanded its reach by launching a digital comics section. These digital editions are offered at a 50% discount from the original print price. The publisher also introduced a yearly subscription option, which provides readers with access to both previous releases and upcoming titles slated for the following year.

During the COVID-19 pandemic, Dhaka Comics also made select titles available as free PDF downloads, allowing fans to continue enjoying their comics.

== Partnership ==
In collaboration with the Quizards, Life 101 Foundation, the United Nations Development Programme's (UNDP) "Diversity for Peace" initiative, they planned to launch a website named "Amader Golpo" with the aim of fostering positive changes in people's mindsets and thought processes by promoting concepts of diversity. The website was officially launched on November 16, 2020, on the International Day for Tolerance. "Amader Golpo" involves storylines based on 25 collected stories. A diverse team contributed to the project, ensuring that the stories and visuals were culturally appropriate and resonant. Dhaka Comics played a crucial role in designing the comic books. The website features five books, each containing five stories centered around a specific theme. These books are freely accessible.
