= Mehedi Haque =

Bangladeshi cartoonist, comic book artist, and editor

- মেহেদী হক
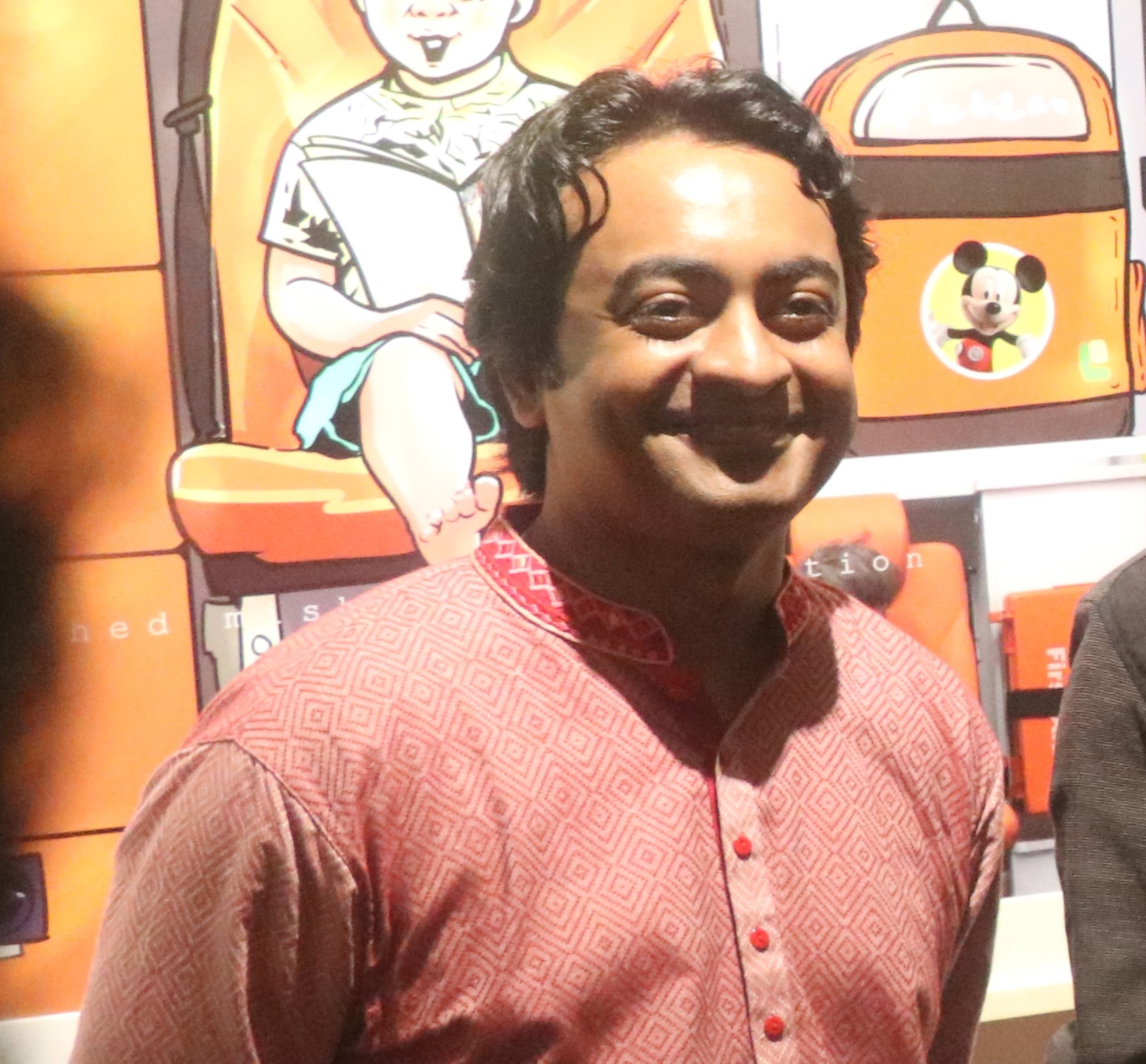
- Mehedi Haque in 2018
- Born: 1984 (age 41–42); Dhaka, Bangladesh
- Education: Jahangirnagar University (B.Sc. Urban and Regional Planning); Bangladesh University of Engineering and Technology (M.Sc. Urban and Regional Planning); California College of the Arts (Post-graduate, Comics)
- Occupations: Cartoonist, Editor
- Years active: 1997 – current

Mehedi Haque (Bengali: মেহেদী হক; born 1984) is Bangladeshi cartoonist, comic book artist, and editor who is known for his contributions to the Bangladeshi cartoon and comic industry, notably as the founder of Dhaka Comics, the executive editor of the satirical magazine Unmad, and senior cartoonist at the daily New Age. He has been engaged in the cartoon and comic book industry of Bangladesh since 1997.

== Early life ==
Haque was born in Dhaka in 1984. He completed his undergraduate degree in Urban and Regional Planning at Jahangirnagar University, followed by a master's degree at Bangladesh University of Engineering and Technology (BUET). In 2023, Haque received a merit-based scholarship from the California College of the Arts for their post-graduate program on 'Comics'.

== Career ==
At age 13, Mehedi began drawing cartoons professionally.

=== Unmad ===
He joined the team at the satirical magazine Unmad in 1998 and currently serves as its executive editor.

=== The Daily New Age ===
Since June 2003, Haque has served as a senior cartoonist for The Daily New Age, an English-language daily newspaper published from Dhaka,

=== Dhaka Comics ===
In 2013, Mehedi Haque founded Dhaka Comics, a Bangladeshi comic book publishing house. The initiative was launched with the aim of producing comic books that cater to Bangladeshi cultural preferences and storytelling. Dhaka Comics introduced its first four comic titles at the Ekushey Book Fair in 2013. The publishing house focuses on various genres, including horror, fantasy, sci-fi, folktale, and humor, and is notable for providing age-group rated comics, a first in Bangladesh. Dhaka Comics has also expanded its reach by translating books into English, offering content through online applications, and extending its business to West Bengal, India.

=== Bangladesh Cartoonist Association (BANCARAS) ===
Mehedi Haque has been actively involved with the Bangladesh Cartoonist Association (BANCARAS) since 2013. He previously served as a Joint Secretary of the association.

== Style and themes ==
Haque's work spans political cartoons, children's book illustrations, and comic book designs. He is known for using cartoons as a tool to highlight social and political issues, including authoritarianism, corruption, and lack of justice in contemporary Bangladesh. His political cartoons often employ satire and wit to convey messages, even in challenging environments where such art forms might be met with resistance.

== Exhibitions ==
In August 2024, Haque was a prominent participant in the "Cartoon Ey Bidroho" (Rebellion in Cartoons) exhibition held at Drik Picture Library in Dhaka. This timely exhibition celebrated the resurgence of political cartoons during the July Revolution in Bangladesh, particularly those created in the lead-up to the significant political changes of that year. The exhibition showcased the works of over 80 cartoonists, featuring 175 artworks that captured the spirit of defiance and satire against censorship and authoritarianism. Mehedi Haque's contributions were highlighted, with the artist stating, "An artist's job is to do what's right at the right time. We paid a debt to the countless deaths and assaults suffered by cartoonists like Ahmed Kabir Kishore." His caricature of Sheikh Hasina, depicting her sheltering behind a statue of herself performing a Nazi salute and holding a board that says "আলোচনা" (discussion), served as the cover art for this exhibition.

== Recognition ==
On 28 December 2016, Haque received the Narayan Debnath Award (2016). This award, named after Bengali comics artist Narayan Debnath and presented annually since 2014, was handed to him in person by Narayan Debnath himself.

In 2025, Haque and Nasreen Sultana Mitu were invited as speakers at Harvard University for ComSciCon’s flagship workshop.

== See also ==
- Dhaka Comics
- Unmad
