= Syed Rashad Imam Tanmoy =

Bangladeshi cartoonist, comic book artist, and editor

- সৈয়দ রাশাদ ইমাম তন্ময়
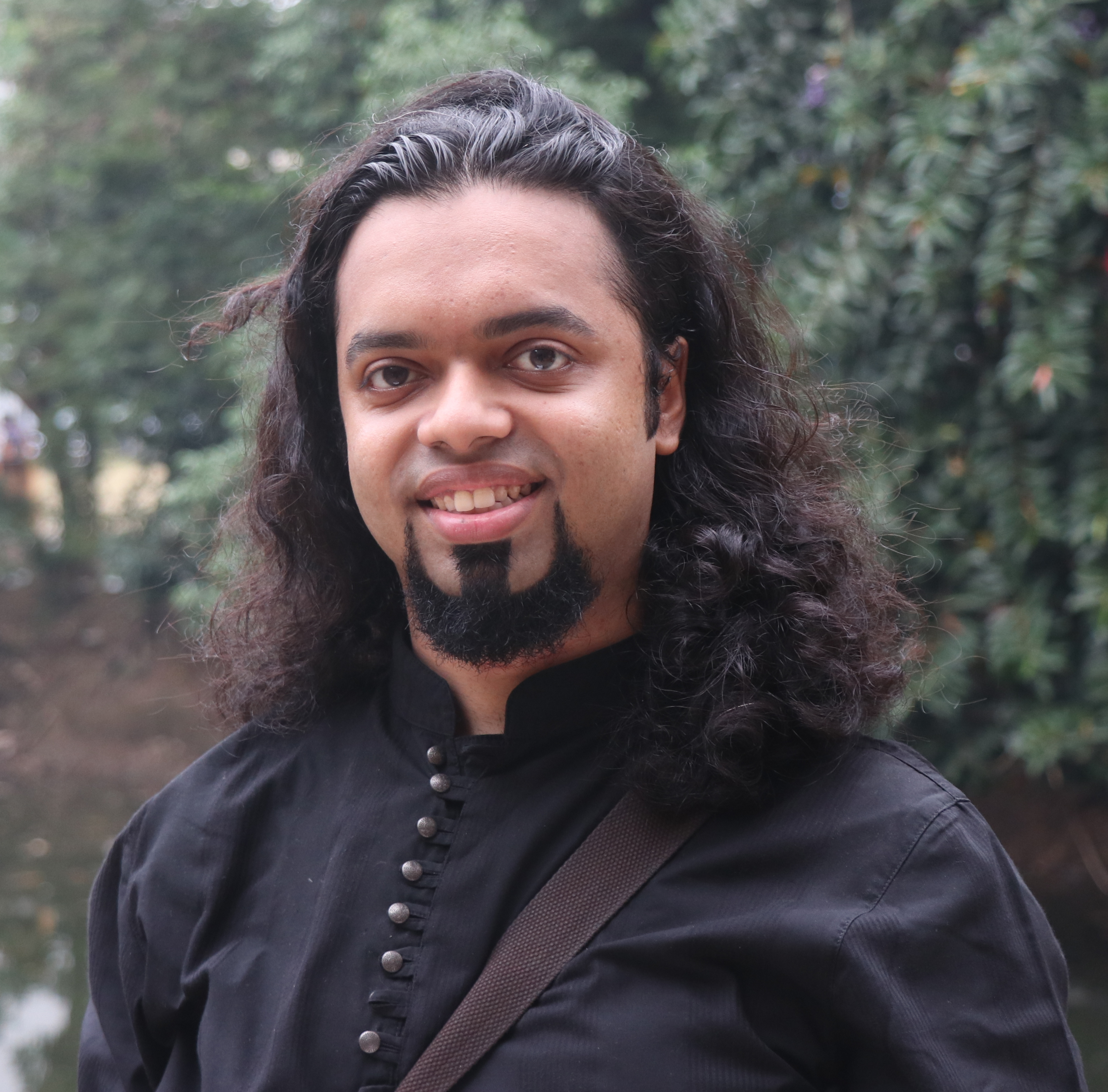
- Tanmoy in 2017
- Born: 27 December 1988 (age 37); Dhaka, Bangladesh
- Education: London Metropolitan University
- Occupations: Cartoonist, Editor
- Years active: 2006 – current

Syed Rashad Imam Tanmoy (born 27 December 1988) is a Bangladeshi cartoonist, comic book artist, and storyteller. He works in comic books, children’s literature, political cartoons, and community-based art projects. He is the founder of Cartoon People, a visual storytelling community, and Cartoon People Comics, an independent publishing house for comics and children's books. Tanmoy has spoken at TEDx North South University (2017) and TEDx RUET (2025).

== Early life and education ==
Born on 27 December 1988 in Dhaka, Bangladesh. His father is Syed Ali Imam and his mother is Hasina Imam. He attended Government Laboratory High School, where he completed his Secondary School Certificate (SSC) in 2003. He later studied at City College, Dhaka, and completed his Higher Secondary Certificate (HSC) in 2005. Tanmoy graduated from London Metropolitan University in 2009.

== Career ==
Tanmoy started his career in 2006 at Unmad, a Bangladeshi satire magazine, where he worked as a cartoonist and later as an assistant editor.

He has created political and editorial cartoons for major Bangladeshi newspapers. His work focuses on freedom of speech, social justice, and human rights. He has worked as an editorial cartoonist for the Daily Sun and the Dhaka Tribune, and has contributed to The Daily Star, Prothom Alo, and Jaijaidin.

Tanmoy has been actively involved with the Bangladesh Cartoonist Association (BANCARAS). He served as a International Relation Secretary of the association.

=== Comics Publishing and Community Engagement ===
In 2016, Tanmoy founded Cartoon People, a community for developing young cartoonists in Bangladesh. In 2022, he founded Cartoon People Comics, which publishes comics, children’s books, and graphic novels that highlight Bangladeshi culture.

He created the comic series Rustom Palowan, based on Bengali folklore. He also illustrated the children’s book Where Are the Chonchols, which celebrates twelve traditional festivals of Bangladesh.

In 2012, Tanmoy served twice as the lead artist for the British Council’s Rivers of the World Thames Festival project. Tanmoy has worked with international organizations such as Artolution to co-create murals and community art projects in underserved areas. He has worked in the Rohingya refugee camps, using art as a tool for healing and communication.

=== Fellowships and Other works ===
In 2014, Tanmoy was selected as a fellow of the Edward R. Murrow Journalism Program under the International Visitor Leadership Program (IVLP) of the United States Department of State. In 2015, he became a World Press Institute Journalism Fellow. In 2012, Tanmoy served as lead artist for Rivers of the World, an international art project initiated by the Thames Festival in London involving collaboration between children from Bangladesh and the United Kingdom.

In 2015, he collaborated on Pother Golpo, a cartoon-based paper theatre installation exhibited at the Alchemy Festival at the Southbank Centre in London. In 2021, Tanmoy created and hosted Cartoon Cartoon, a 13-episode educational television series for children. The programme aired on Bangladesh Television (BTV) and later on Duronto Television, focusing on basic cartooning and visual storytelling skills.

== Exhibitions ==
In 2014, Tanmoy held a solo political cartoon exhibition titled Can You Handle the Truth? at the Edward M. Kennedy Center for Public Service and the Arts (EMK Center) in Dhaka. The exhibition focused on contemporary political and social issues.

Later the same year, he presented On a Serious Note, a political cartoon exhibition at the Nordic Club in Dhaka, continuing his engagement with political satire and visual commentary.

In 2015, Tanmoy curated an exhibition titled Birth of an Art, Rise of an Industry at the Richmix Festival, which examined the development of political cartooning in Bangladesh.

== Awards and Fellowships ==
- World Press Institute Journalism Fellow (2015) – focused on cartooning during politically sensitive periods.
- IVLP Edward R. Murrow Journalism Program Fellow (2014) – awarded for contributions to visual storytelling.
- Himal South Asian Cartoon Competition – Editor’s Picklist Award.

== See also ==
- Cartoon People
- Unmad
