= Nasreen Sultana Mitu =

Bangladeshi cartoonist

- নাসরীন সুলতানা মিতু
- Born: 1987 (age 38–39); Bangladesh
- Occupations: Cartoonist, science teacher

Nasreen Sultana Mitu (born 1987) is a Bangladeshi political cartoonist, caricaturist, and science educator who signs her work with the name Mitu. She is the most prominent female cartoonist in Bangladesh.

== Early life and education ==
Mitu was born in Bangladesh in 1987.

== Career ==
She began her cartooning career in 2006. Her early work appeared in the Bangladeshi satirical magazine Unmad and Dhaka Comics where she drew cartoons and caricatures. She later became an associate editor at Unmad. Her political cartoons have also been published in the English-language newspaper New Age and on other news platforms.

One of her most widely shared cartoons was created after the 2013 Rana Plaza building collapse. In this work, she drew a pair of jeans with a price tag showing drops of blood, to comment on the value of workers’ lives in the garment industry.

Mitu also works in science education. She founded Project Tiktaalik to create science learning materials using cartoons and comics. She has helped develop science curriculum and illustrations for the National Curriculum and Textbook Board (NCTB) in Bangladesh.

In 2025, she and fellow cartoonist Mehedi Haque conducted a creative workshop on science communication for graduate students at Harvard University as part of ComSciCon.

Mitu was an assistant professor at the University of Rajshahi until 2018. She serves on the board of Cartoonists Rights Network International and is a member of the Bangladesh Cartoonist Association.

== Style and Themes ==
Mitu’s work combines simple drawings with strong messages. She uses cartoons to explain social issues, politics, and science. Her science comics aim to make complex ideas easier and more fun for children and young learners.

== Exhibitions and Projects ==
In 2014, Mitu held a solo caricature exhibition titled Meet the Faces at the Alliance Française de Dhaka, showing portraits of artists and other notable figures.

She also creates and publishes comics and books, including science-based comics such as Science Mix-Comics and Newtoner Tin Sutro, which are aimed at young readers.

== Personal life ==
Mitu is married to Mehedi Haque, who is also a Bangladeshi cartoonist.
