= Bangladesh Food Safety Authority =

Bangladeshi Organization

- Logo
- Formation: 2015
- Headquarters: Dhaka, Bangladesh
- Region served: Bangladesh
- Official language: Bengali
- Website: www.bfsa.gov.bd

Bangladesh Food Safety Authority is an autonomous national food safety statutory regulatory agency, part of the government of Bangladesh. Mustak Hassan Md Iftekhar was the founding chairman of the authority. Mr Zakaria was appointed chairman in March 2024.

== History ==
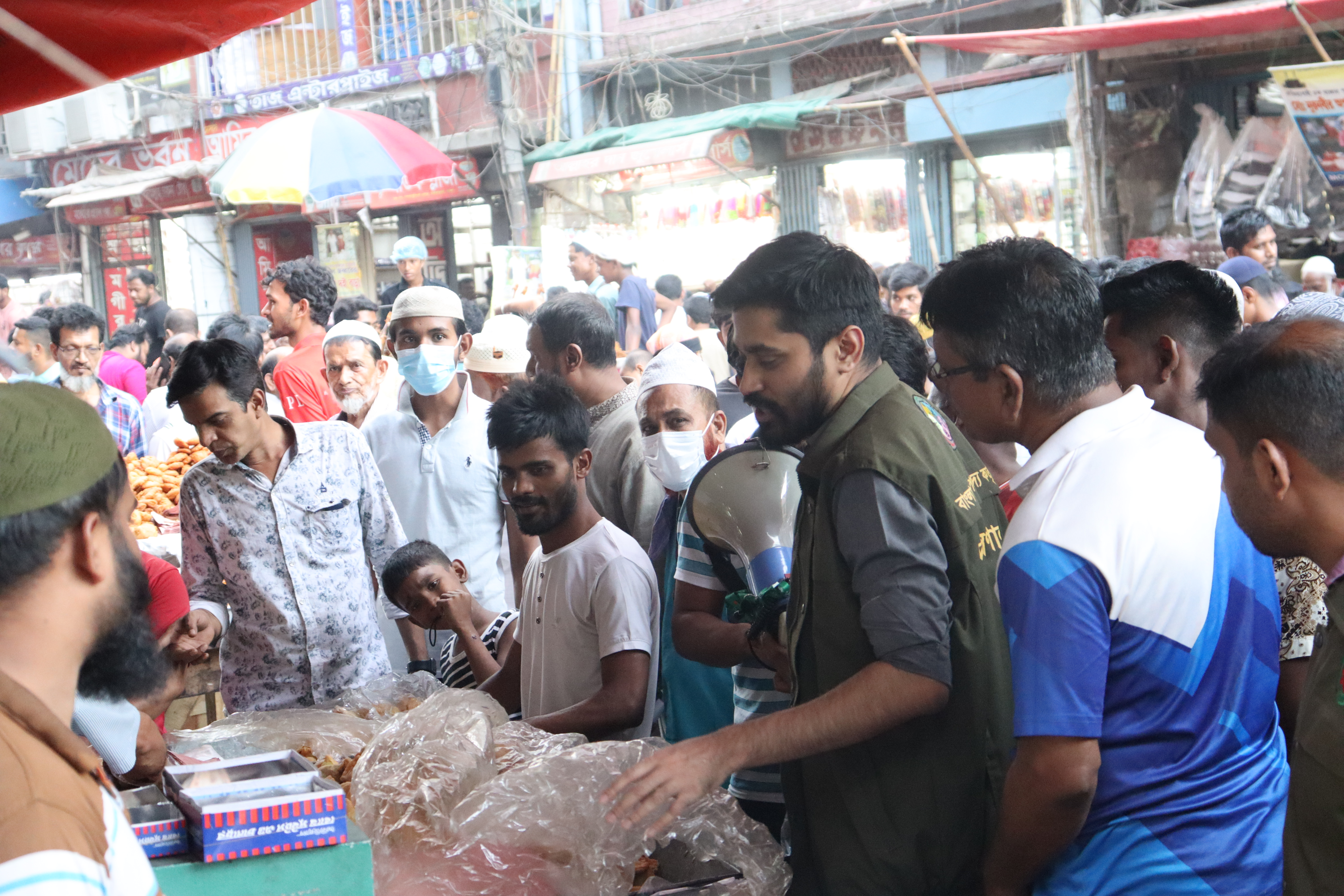
Bangladesh Food Safety Authority at Chawkbazar on 13 April 2023

The authority was formed in February 2015, under the Food Safety Act 2013. The authority works under the Ministry of Food. The authority was modeled on the United States Food and Drug Administration. It is governed by a five-member decision-making body. The agency has its own mobile court that can fine and sentence people for food adulteration.
