= Tajhat Palace =

Historic palace in Rangpur, Bangladesh

- তাজহাট রাজবাড়ী
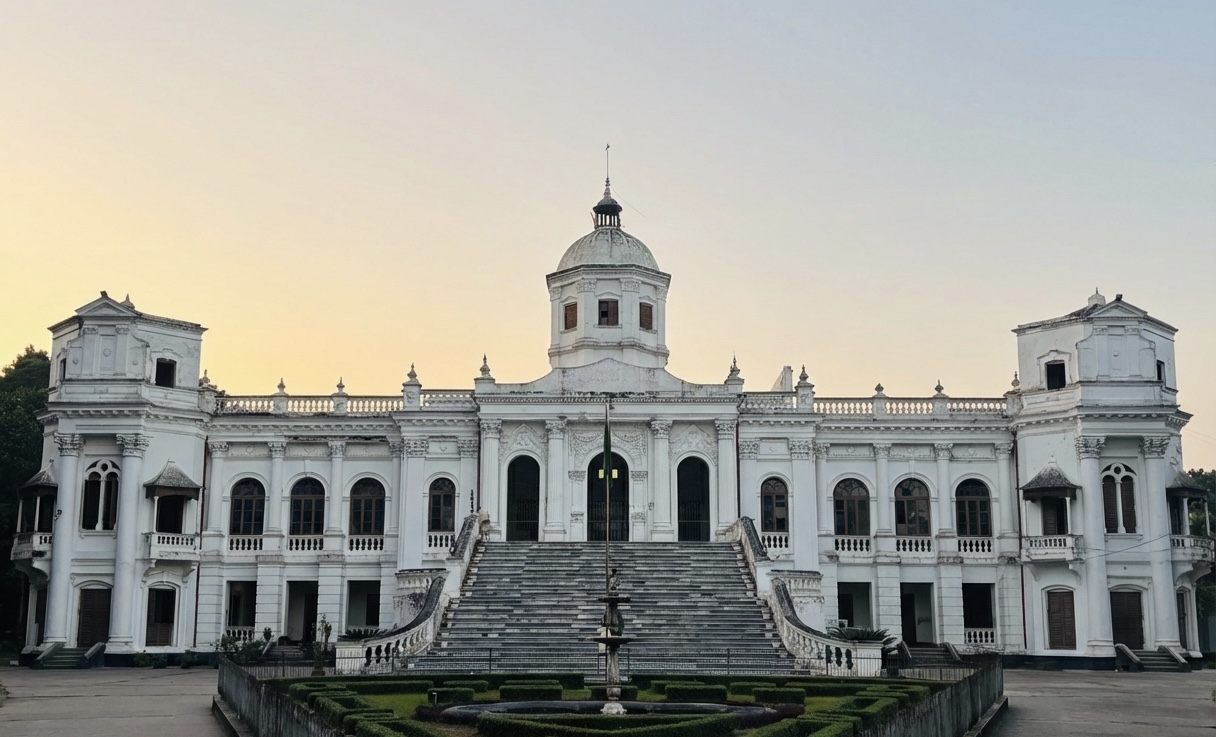
- Tajhat Palace from front

- Location within Rangpur division
- Established: 20th century
- Location: Tajhat, Rangpur, Bangladesh
- Coordinates: 25.7251°N 89.2804°E
- Accreditation: Department of Archaeology (Bangladesh)
- Collection size: 2100
- Curator: Md Khairul Bashar Swapan

Tajhat Palace (Bengali: তাজহাট রাজবাড়ী Tājahāṭa Rājabāṛī) or Tajhat Rajbari is a historic palace in Rangpur, Bangladesh. This palace now holds the Rangpur museum. Tajhat Palace is situated six km south-east of the city of Rangpur, on the outskirts of town.

== Structure ==
The palace, with about 76 metres frontage, rises two storeys and is faced east. An imposing broad staircase in the centre, paved with imported white marble, leads directly above the portico to the upper storey.

The palace is crowned by a ribbed conical dome in the centre of the roof with a tall octagonal neck, partly supported on a series of slender semi-Corinthian columns. The balustrade on either side of the imposing staircase was originally embellished with various sculptures of classical Roman figures in Italian marble, but now these are missing. There are two semi-octagonal projections at each end of the front face and a central projecting porch. The balcony roof above the porch is carried on four graceful Corinthian columns with round shafts, while two similar columns on each of the projecting ends of the building support a triangular gable.

The palace is laid out in the form on a "U", with its open end to the west. Beyond the entrance at ground-floor level there is a very large hall, measuring more than 18 x 13 meters. A 3-meter wide corridor runs the entire length of the inner block. Two broad wooden staircases provide access to the upper floor. There are about 22 apartments on two floors.

== History ==
The palace was built by Maharaja Kumar Gopal Lal Roy in the beginning of the 19th century. It is believed that from the conspicuous appearance of his Taj or jeweled crown, his estate derived the name of Tajhat.

From 1984 to 1991 the palace was used as a Rangpur High Court Branch of the Supreme Court of Bangladesh. In 1995 the palace was declared as a protected monument by the Department of Archaeology. Recognizing its outstanding architectural value the Government of Bangladesh shifted the Rangpur Museum to the second floor of the palace in 2005. The main room at the top of the marble stairs have a number of display cases which show 10th–11th century terracotta artifacts. There are a number of fine examples of Sanskrit and Arabic manuscripts, including copies of the Mahabharat, Ramayan, and a Quran whose provenance is attributed to none other than the Mughal Emperor Aurangzeb. The back rooms have several examples of black stone Hindu carvings in its back rooms, mainly of the deity Vishnu. Photography is not permitted in the museum itself.

== Gallery ==
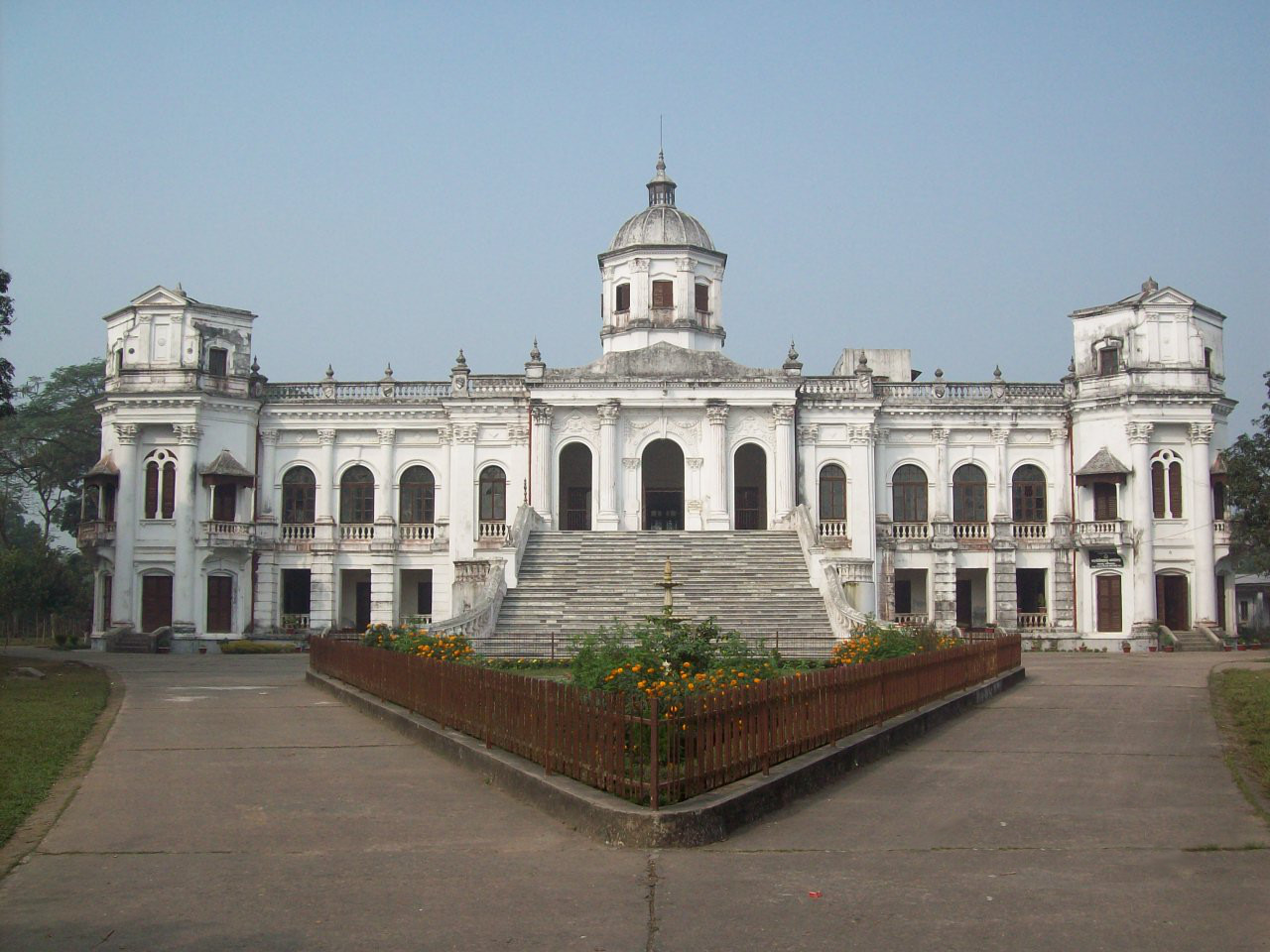
Entrance view

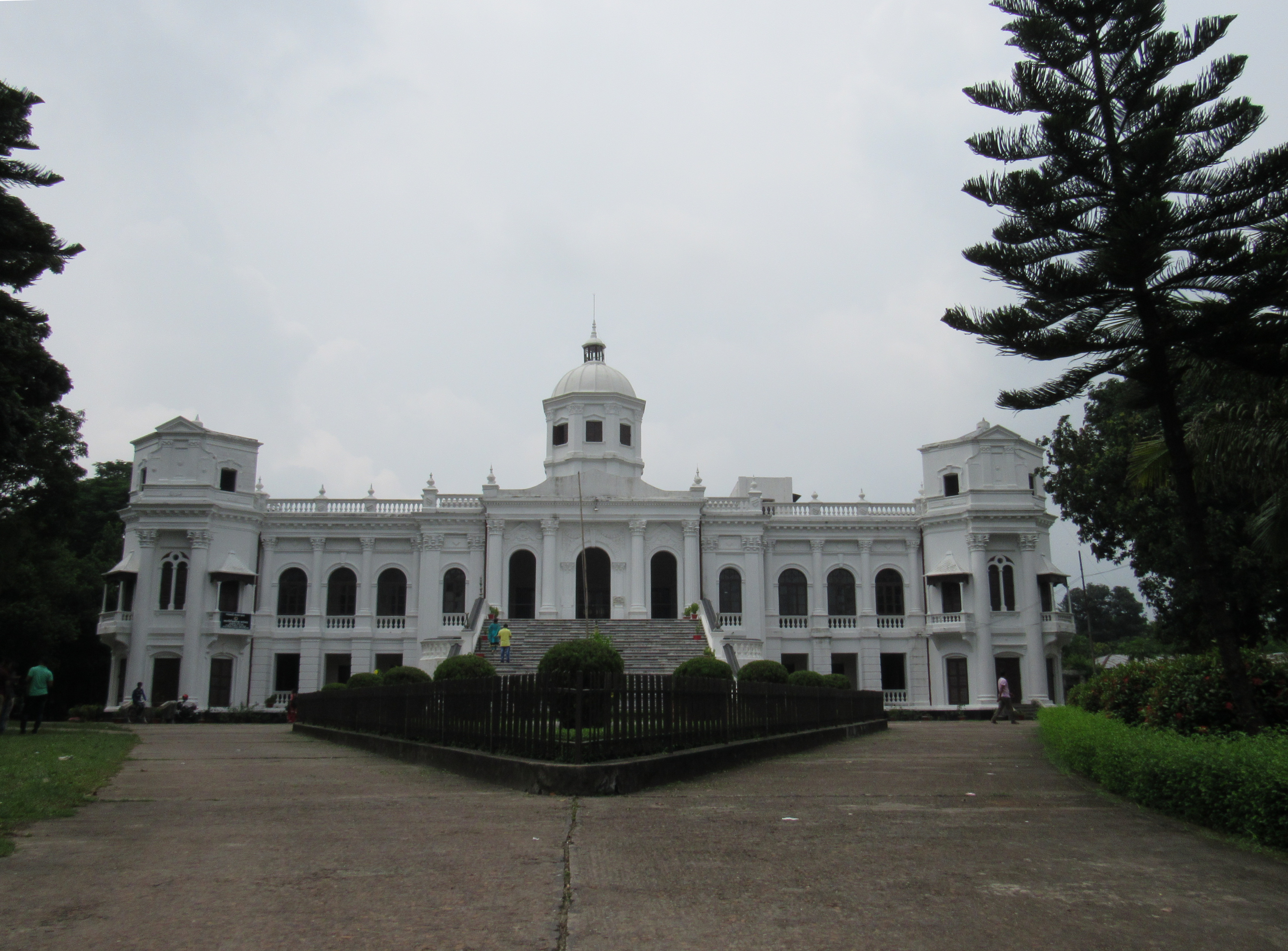
Close Front of Tajhat Palace

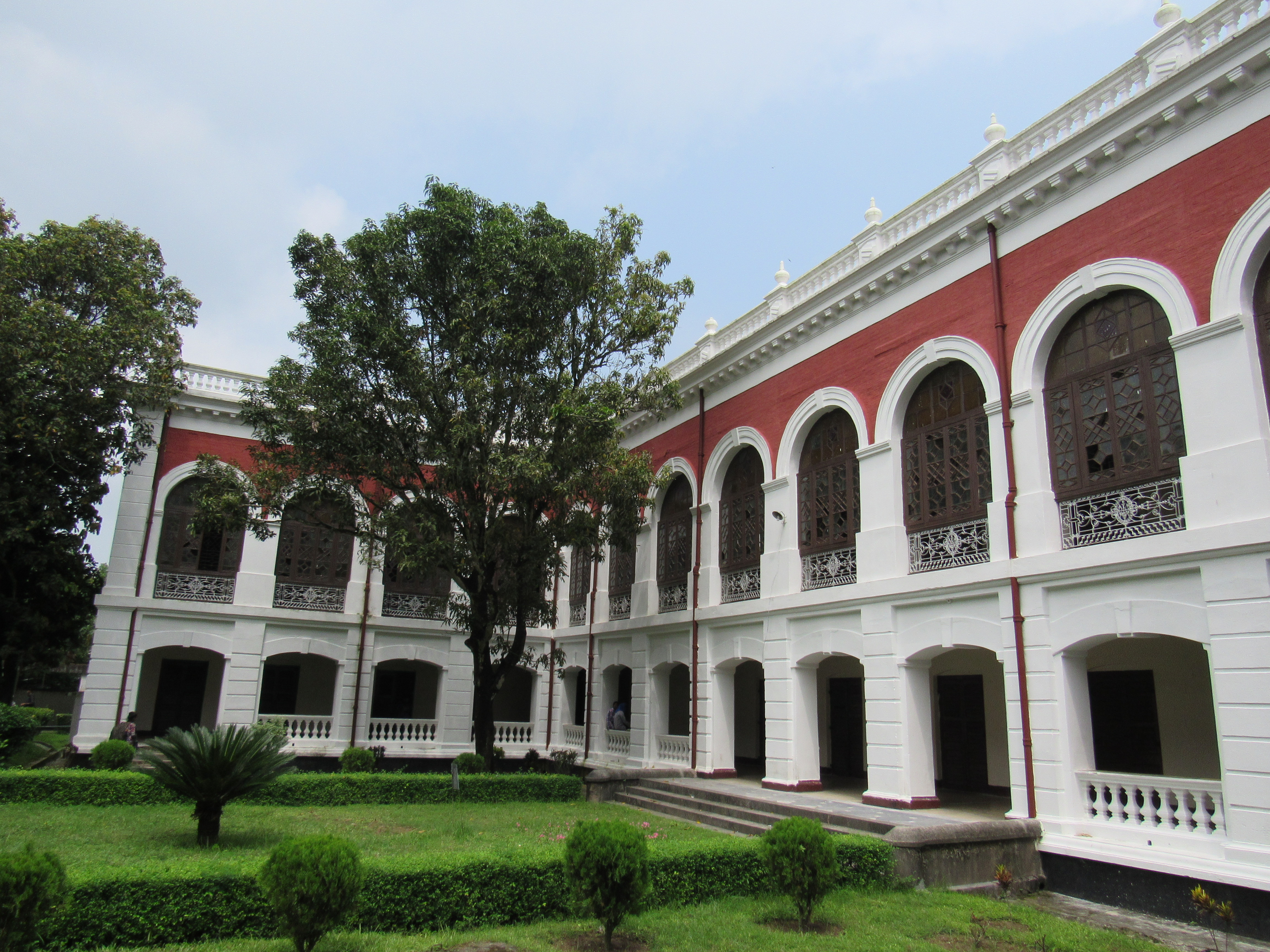
Backyard court

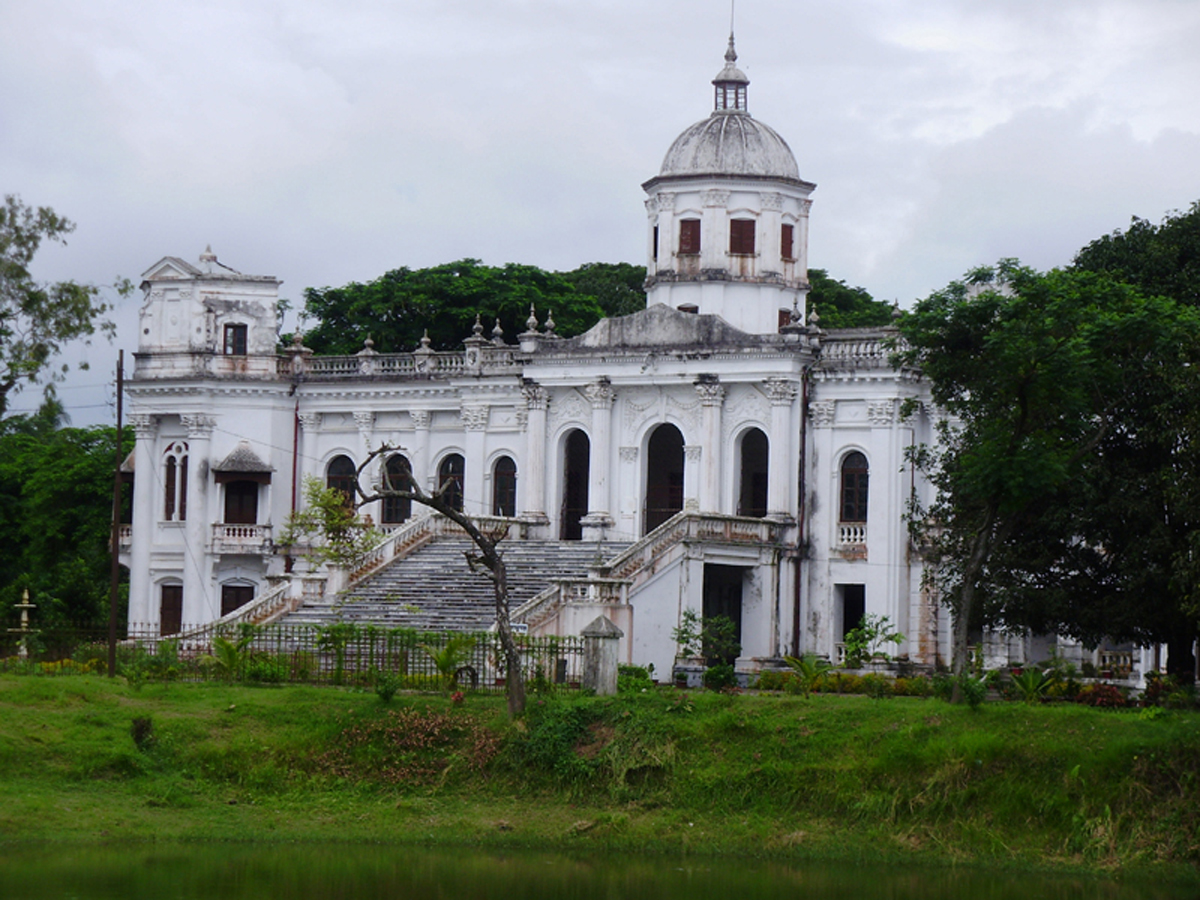
Another view

The Coat of Arms of Maharaja Gopal Lal Roy as depicted on a ground floor French Door window panel

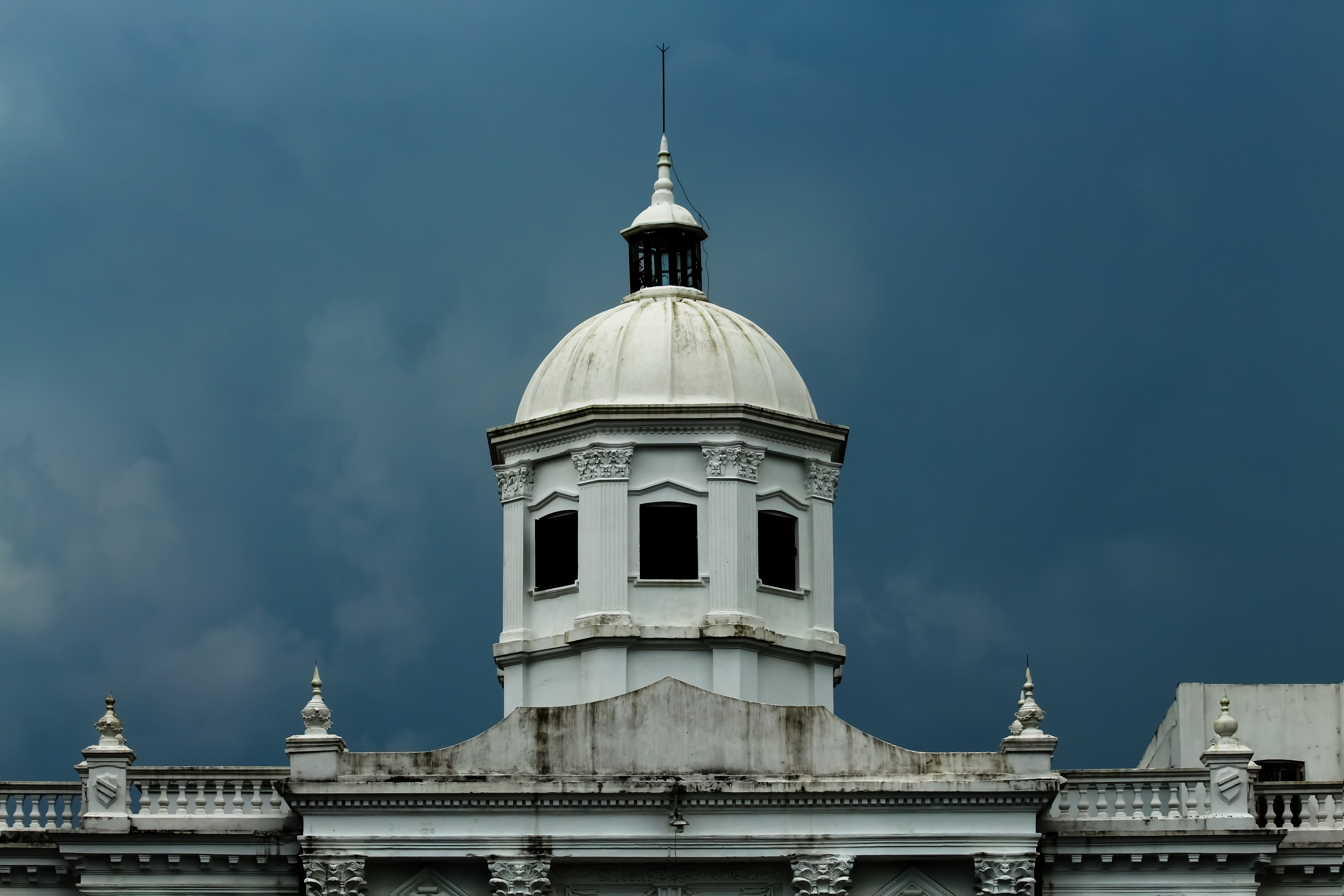
Dome of palace

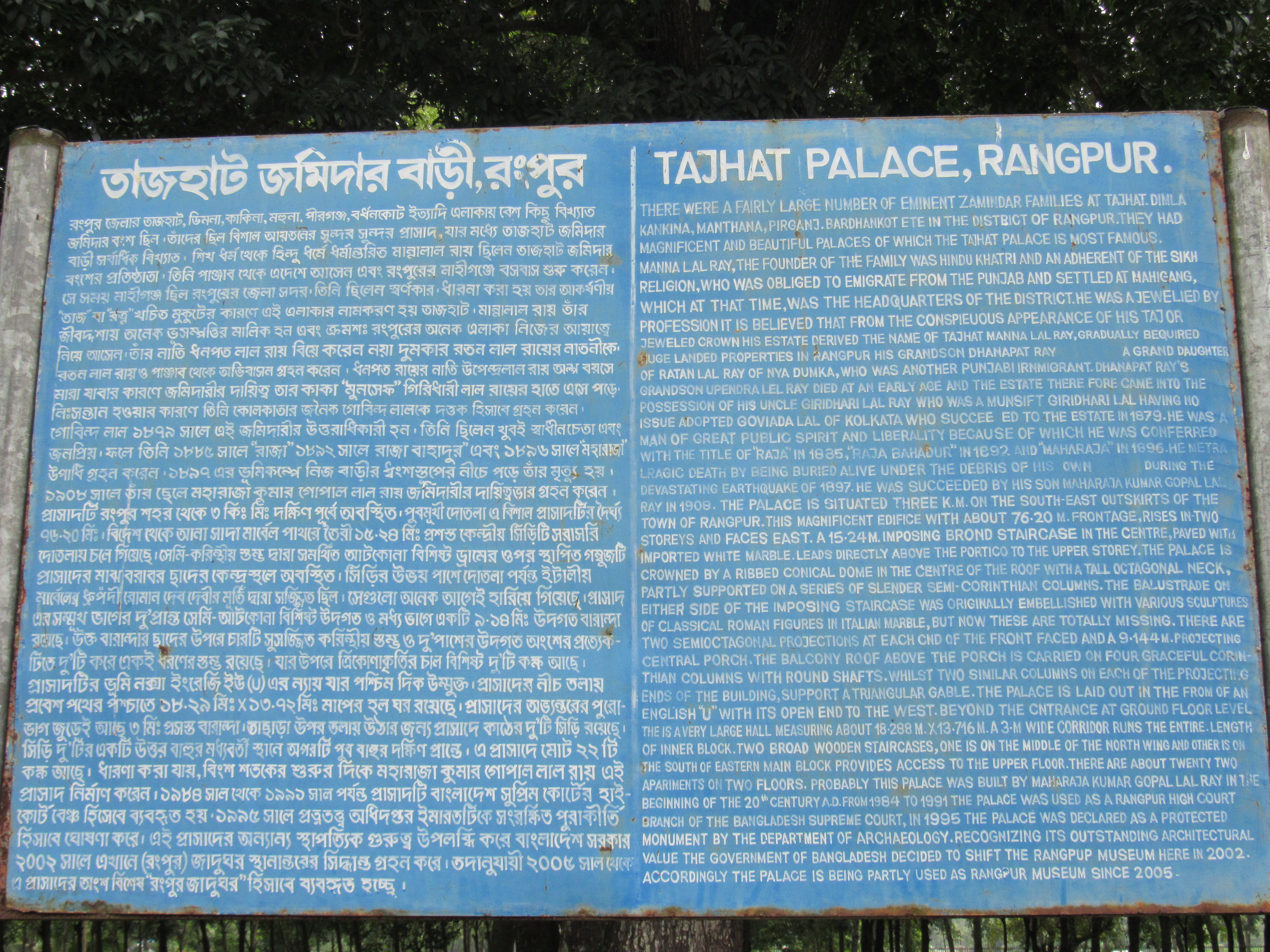
Brief history of Tajhat palace

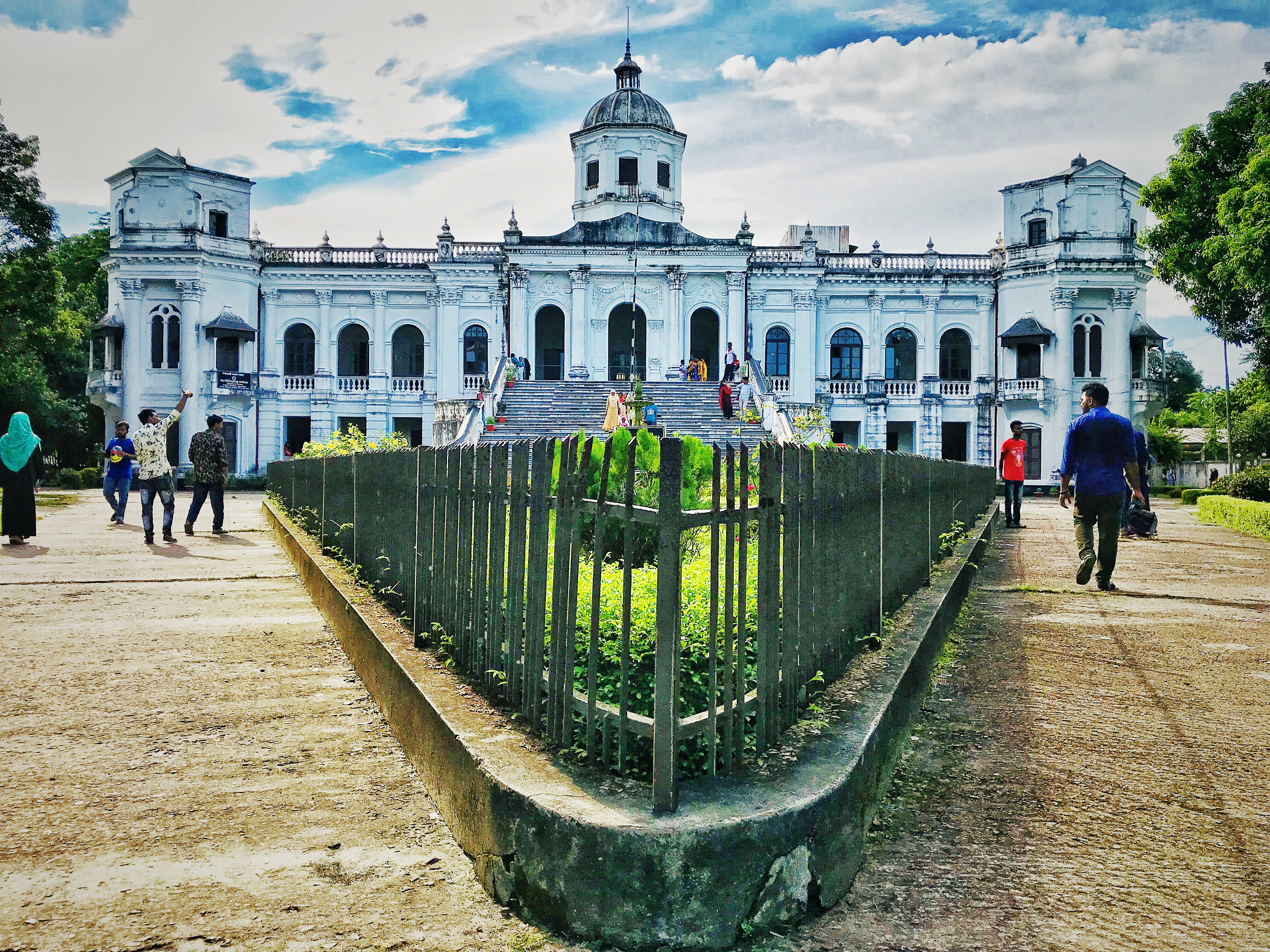
Another view

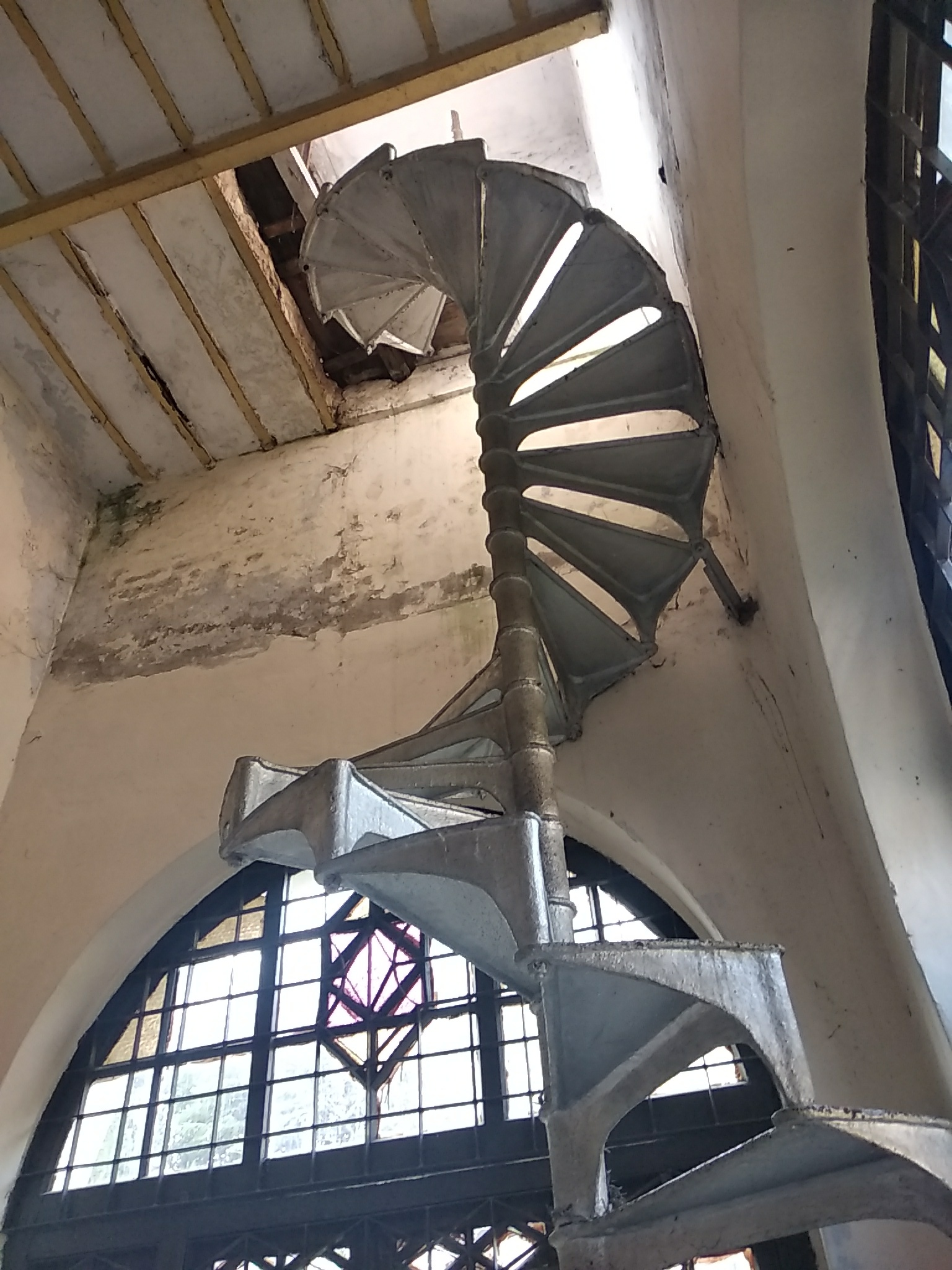
ancient round stairs of Tajhat Palace

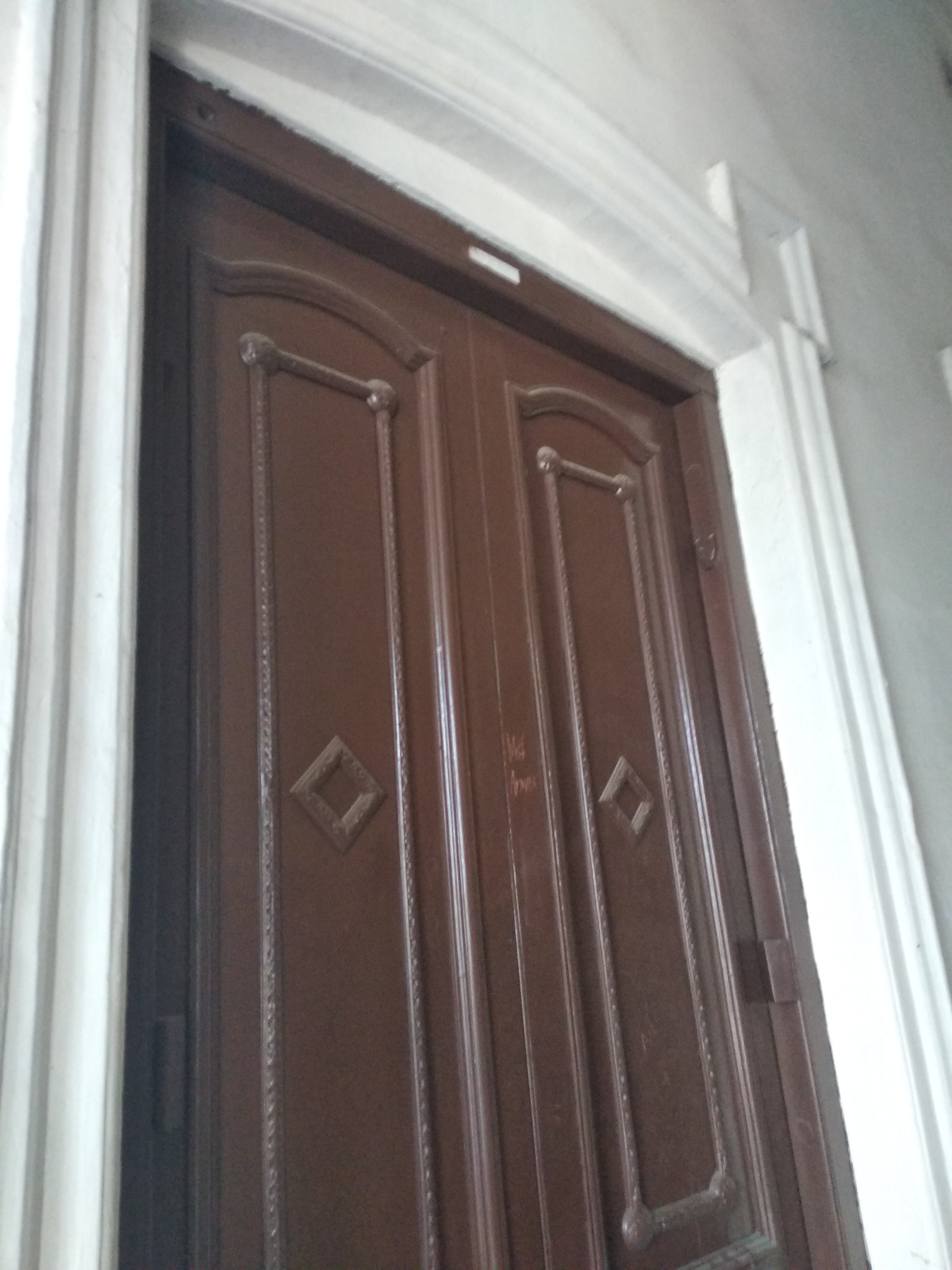
200 years ancient wooden door.

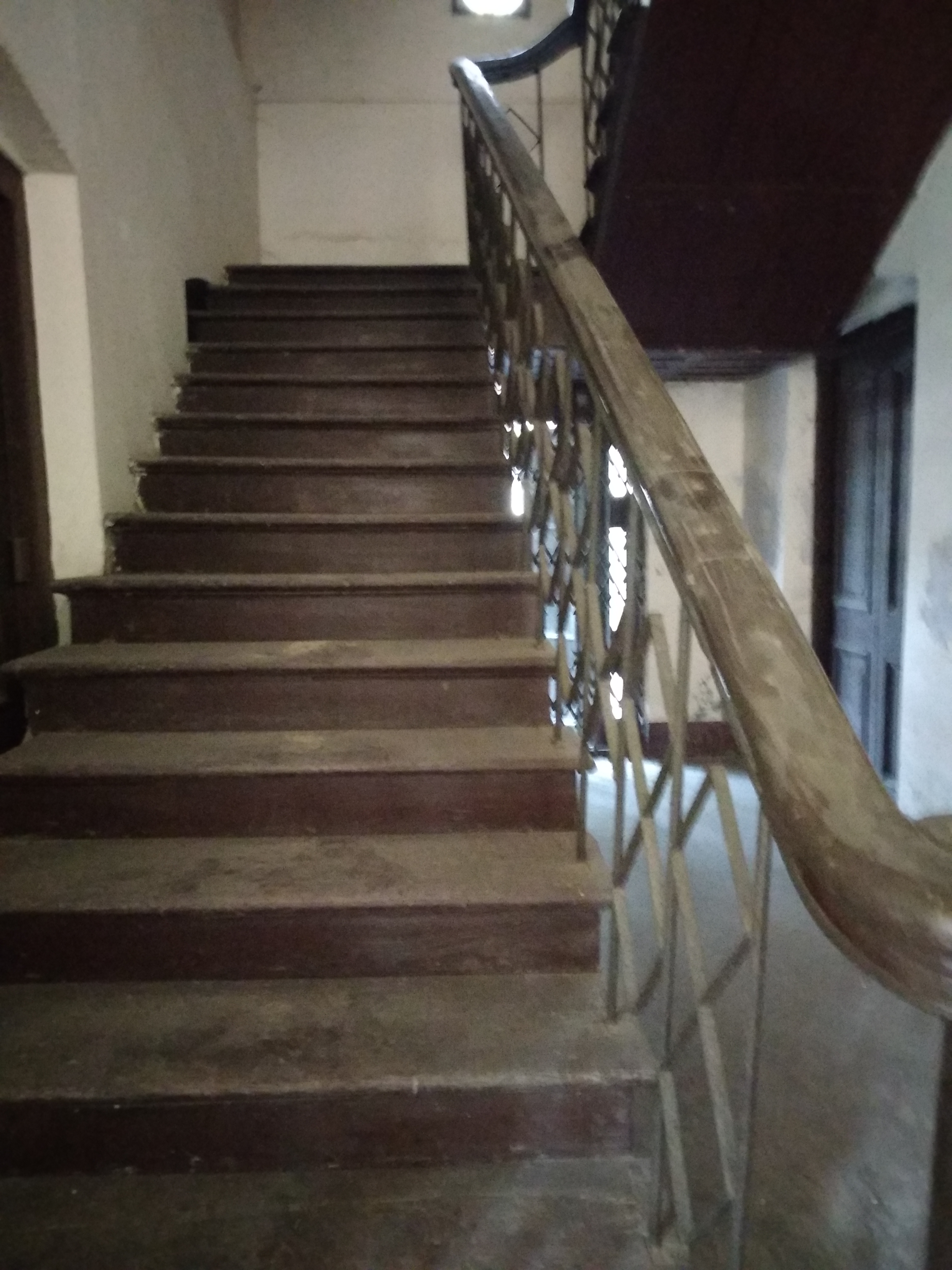
Wooden stairs of Tajhat Palace

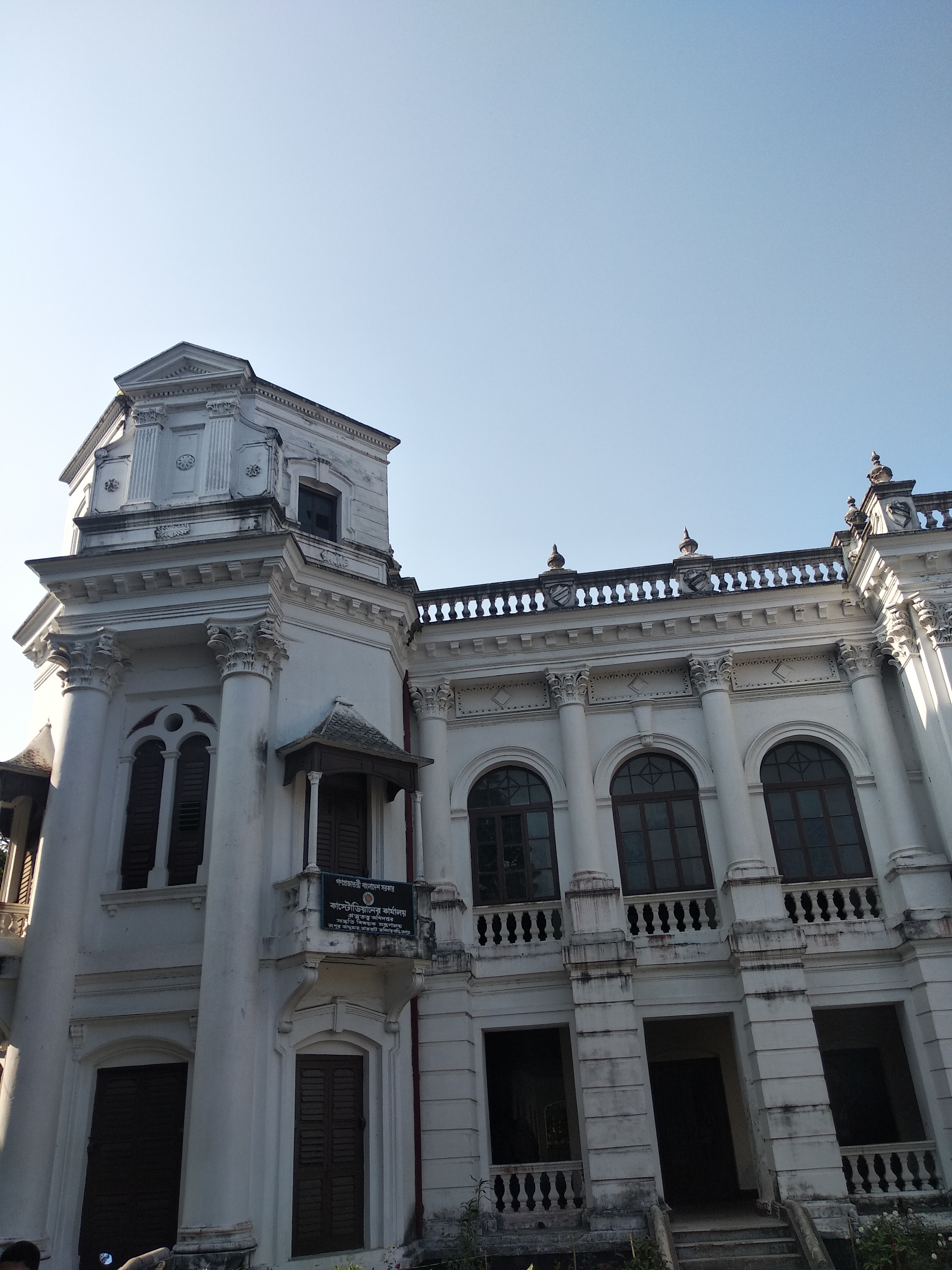
A side of Palace

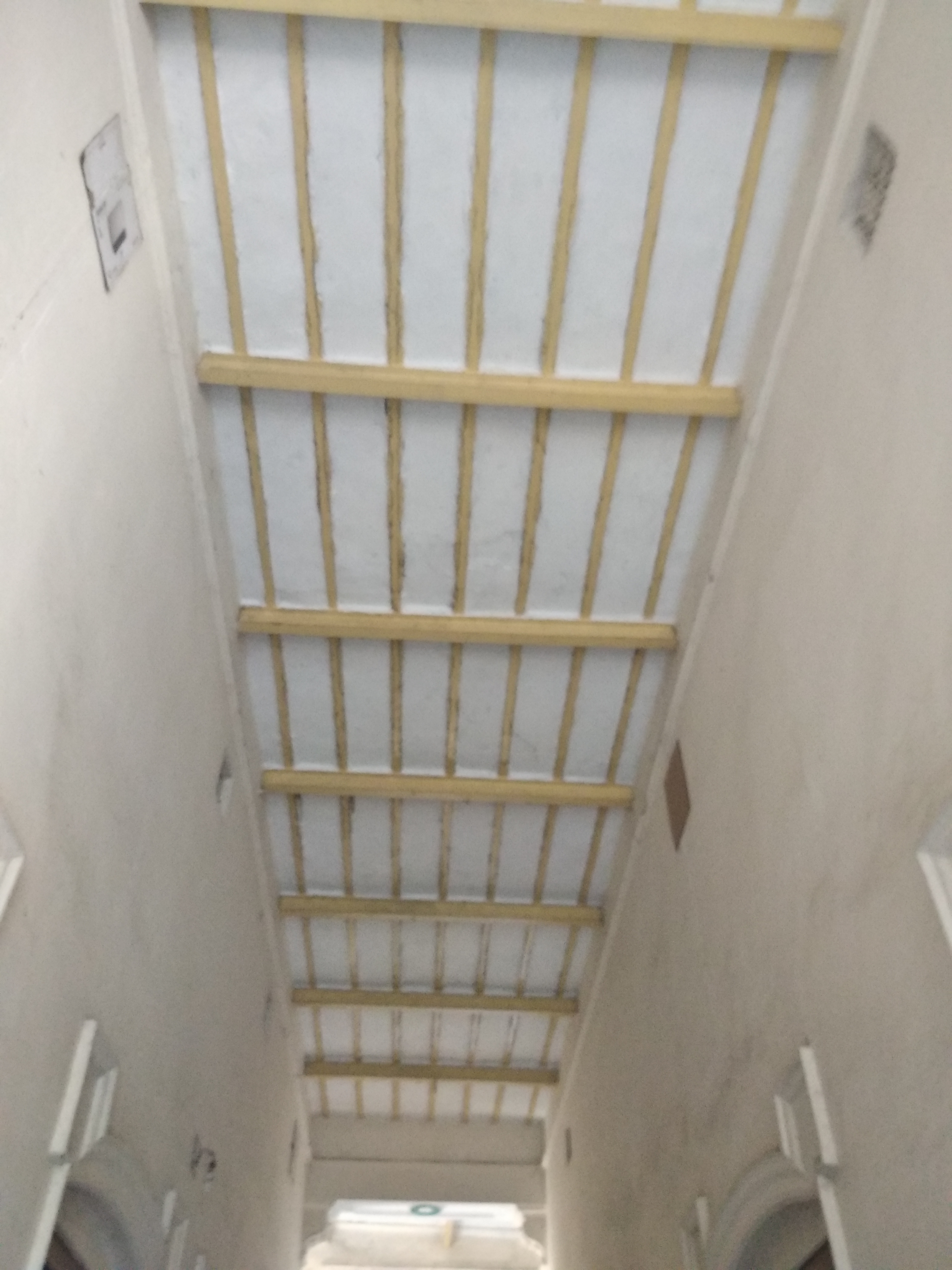
High ceiling

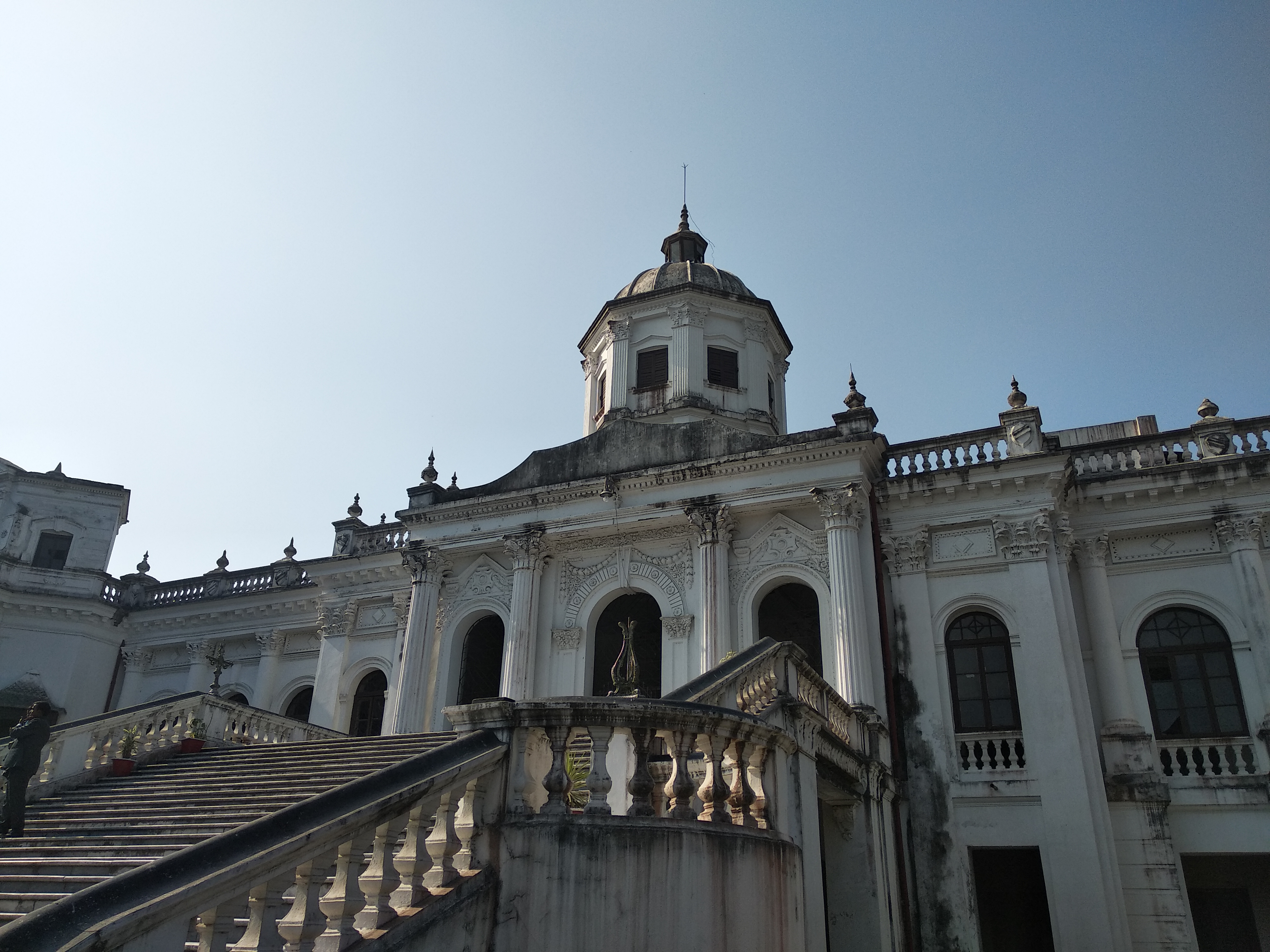
Front view

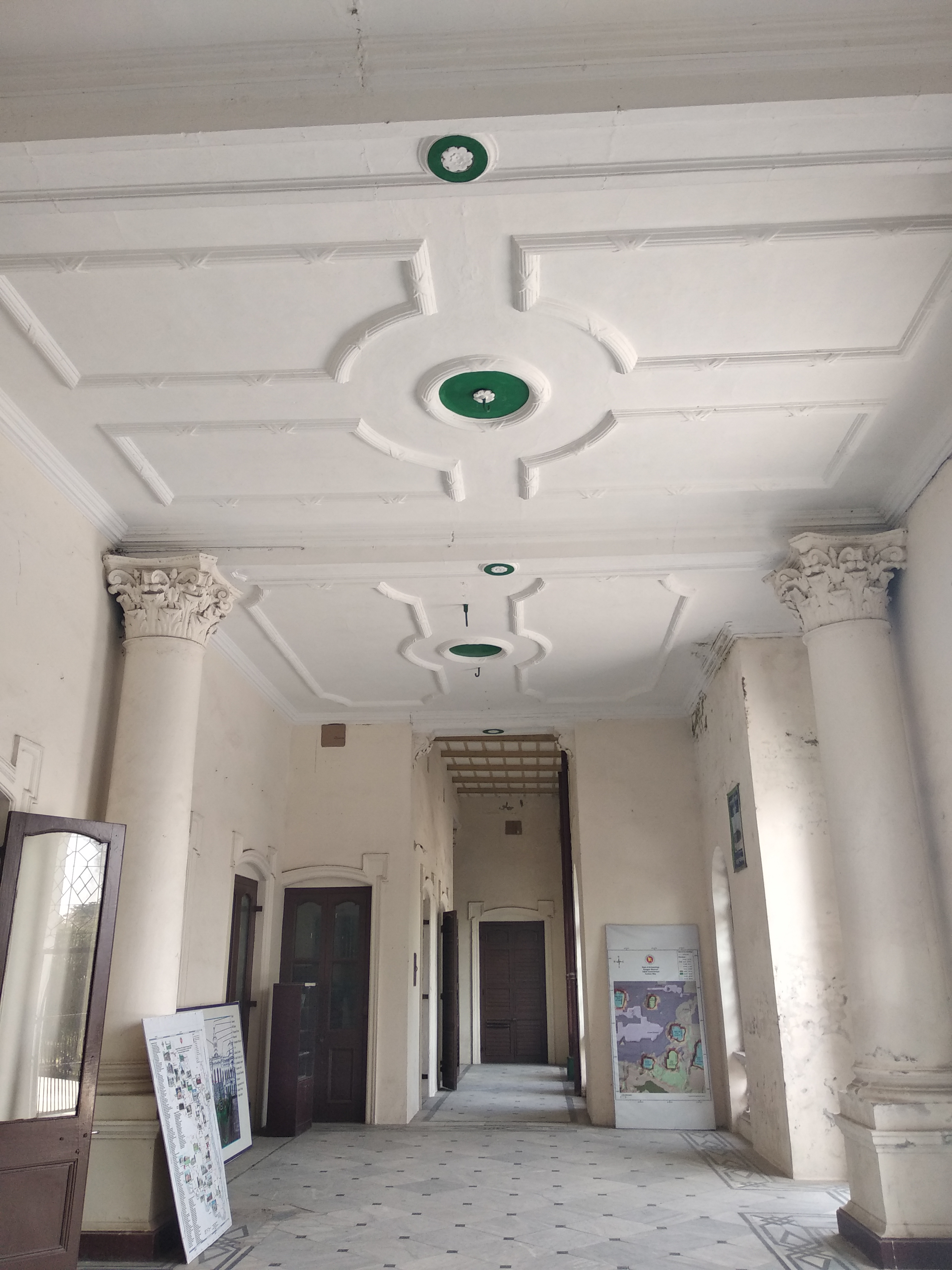
Interior

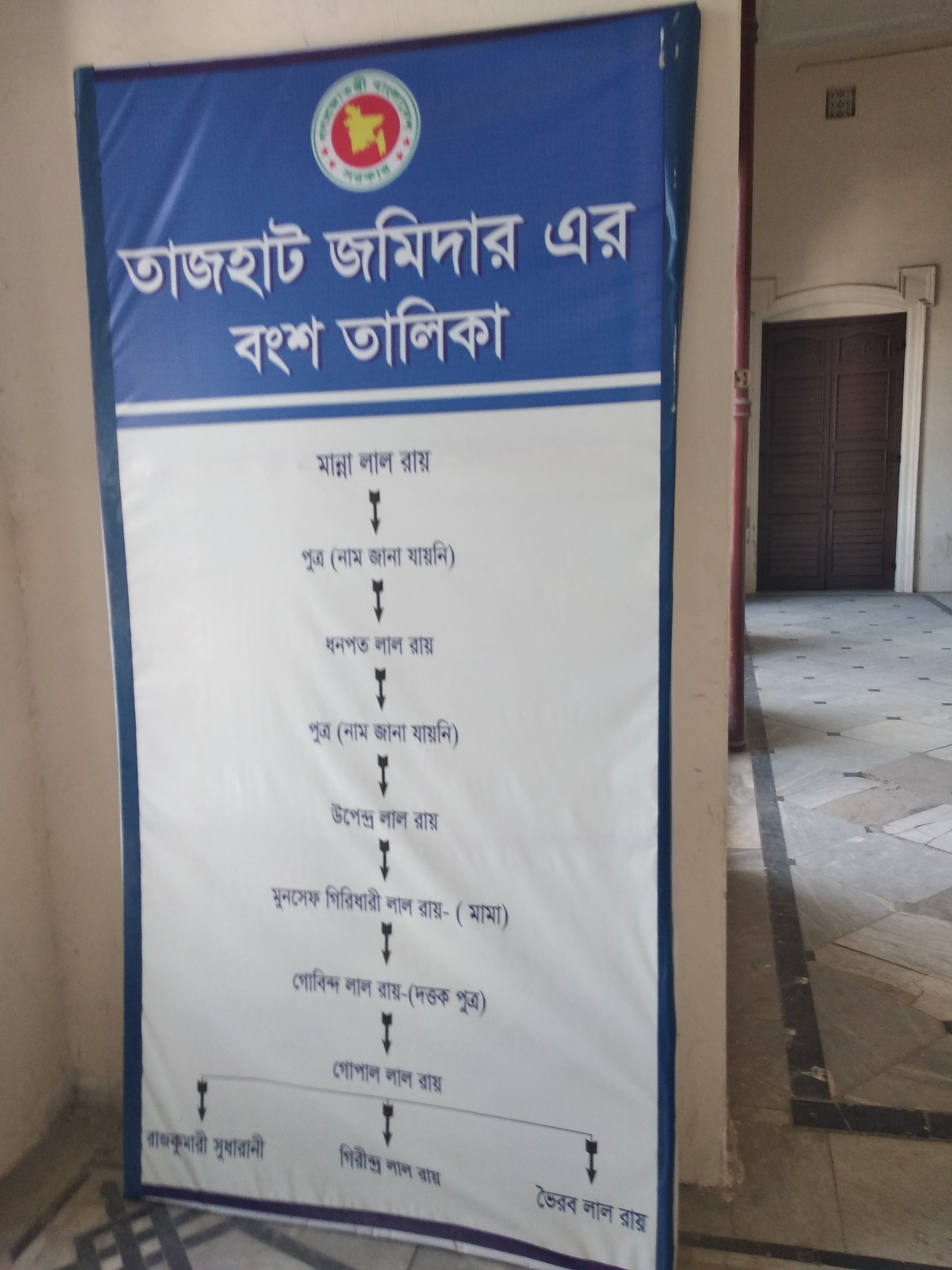
Family tree and genealogy

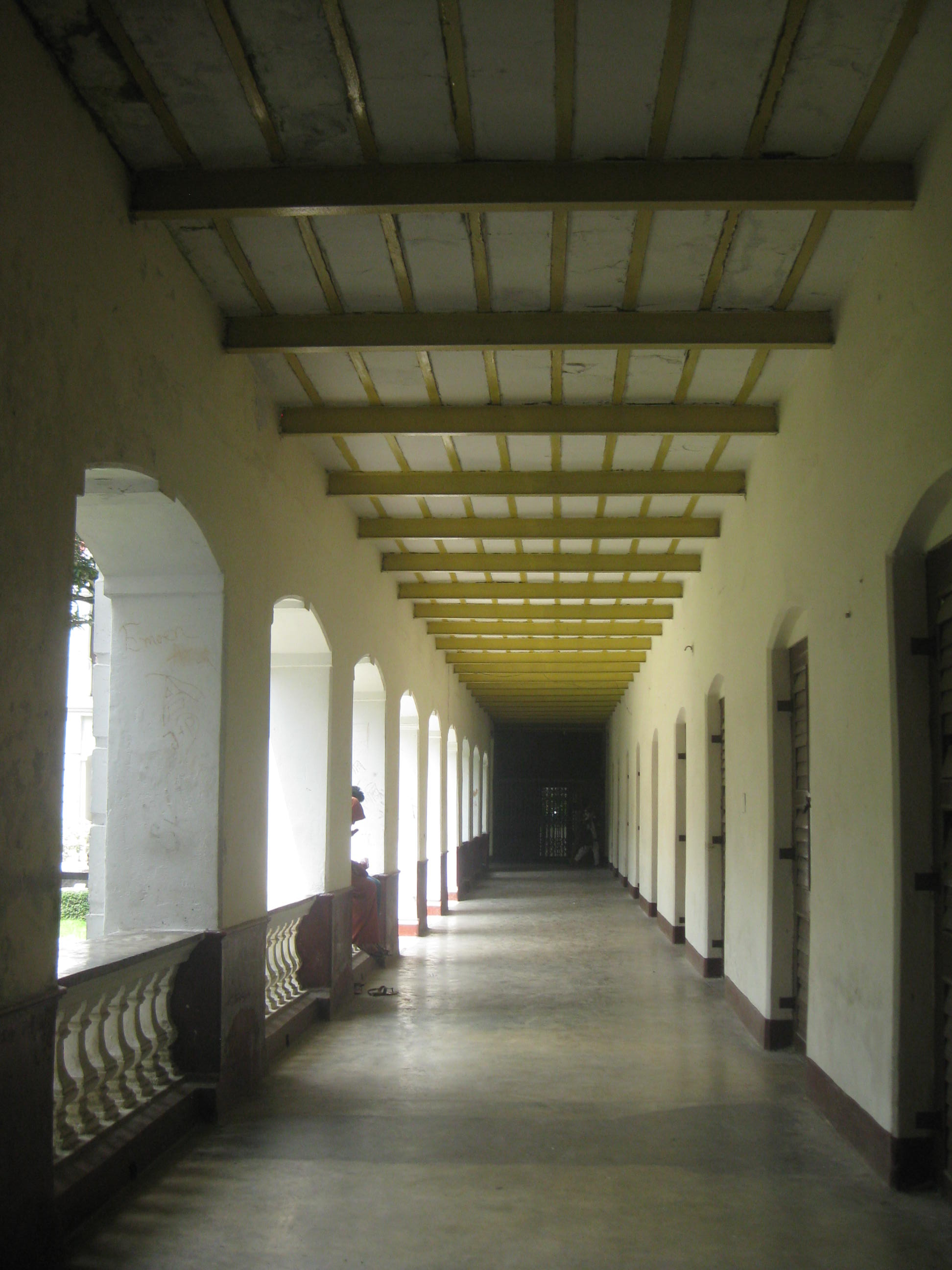
Corridor in the ground floor, facing to the back yard.
