= Rahimafrooz =

Rahimafrooz (Bangladesh) Ltd.
- Company type: Private
- Founded: 15 April 1954; 70 years ago in East Bengal, Dominion of Pakistan
- Founder: A. C. Abdur Rahim
- Headquarters: Dhaka, Bangladesh
- Products: Battery; Tyre; Lubricant; Solar panel Generator; IPS; Digital Learning; ISP
- Website: www.rahimafrooz.com

Rahimafrooz (Bangladesh) Ltd., founded in 1954 by A. C. Abdur Rahim as a trading company in Chittagong, is one of the largest business groups in Bangladesh. It consists of eight strategic business units and several other affiliations. The group chairman is Afroz Rahim and the directors are Feroz Rahim, Niaz Rahim, Mohammed Ismail, Munawar Misbah Moin and Mudassir Moin. In 2012 it received permission from the government of Bangladesh to open a manufacturing unit in India.

Rahimafrooz operates in three broad domains: automotive after market, power and energy, and retail chain. It sells tyres, batteries, lubricants, emergency power products, diesel and gas generators, lighting products, electrical accessories, solar systems, energy systems using compressed natural gas, and power rectifiers. The group also runs Agora, the first retail chain in Bangladesh. Rural Services Foundation is the charity branch of the group.

== History ==
A. C. Abdur Rahim was born on 20 January 1915. After being orphaned at age seven, he was raised by an uncle, who employed him in his departmental store. Rahim partnered in a small tailoring and textile business in Calcutta, then in the early 1940s began trading independently on a modest scale. He married in 1945, and two years later, after the partition of India, moved his family to Chittagong, East Bengal. In 1950, he formed a small trading company with a capital of 200,000 Pakistani rupees ($42,000 as of 1950).

On 15 April 1954, he incorporated the business as Rahimafrooz & Co, named after his eldest son, Afrooz Rahim. Initially, it focused on garment retailing.
