= Bangladesh Cartoonist Association =

- Founded: January 2011
- Headquarters: Dhaka, Bangladesh
- Key people: President: Zahid Hasan Benu
- Website: www.bancaras.com

Bangladesh Cartoonist Association (BANCARAS) is an organization of the cartoonists of Bangladesh established in January 2011. The aim of the organization is to work as a common platform for countrywide cartoonists. BANCARAS keeps cartoonists connected by gathering with the work and thought of them. BANCARAS plans to arrange several cartoon exhibitions every year focusing on different issues, including regular cartoon workshops.

== Platform ==
Nowadays cartoons are a very popular medium in Bangladesh. But it was not so popular as it is now when it was just innovated in Bangladesh. First Bangladeshi cartoonist, Kazi Abul Kashem who started to draw cartoons in a magazine named "shawgat" in 1930s. In 1971s liberation war Quamrul Hassans cartoon "ei janowarder hotta korte hobe" influenced the freedom fighters deeply. In 1978, satire magazine "Unmad" was published and received high popularity among the people. In the 80's and 90's editorial cartoons was getting popular among general people through newspapers. After 2000, there was an increases in number of amateur cartoonist who grew up from the young generation. Presently, Bangladesh has a large number of newspapers where cartoons are a highly popular section.

== Cartoon exhibition 2011 ==
Bangladesh Cartoonist Association had arranged their 1st cartoon exhibition on 9-11 January 2011. The National Press Club compounded a three-day exhibition, which was a huge success followed by thousands of viewers. With this exhibition, Bangladesh Cartoonist Association started its voyage ceremonially.

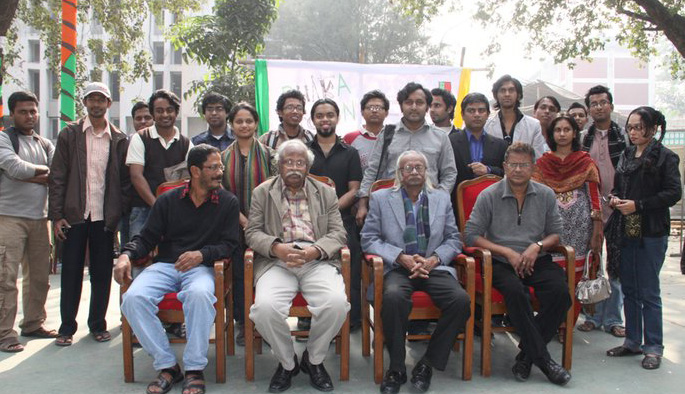
members of Bangladesh Cartoonist Association on occasion of cartoon exhibition 2011 at National Press Club, Dhaka

== Executive body ==
Advisor	Rafiqun Nabi
Advisor	Ahsan Habib (cartoonist)
Advisor	Shishir Bhattacharjee
Advisor	Shahriar Khan
President	Zahid Hasan Benu
Vice-president	Shahriar Sharif
Secretary	Abu Hasan
Joint Secretary	Mehedi Haque
Joint Secretary	Kuddus Ahmed
Treasurer	Niaz Chowdhury Tuli
Organizing Secretary	Sadat Uddin Ahmed
Publicity Secretary	Zonayed Azim Chowdhury
Public Welfare Secretary	Nasreen Sultana Mitu
International Relation Secretary	Syed Rashad Imam (Tanmoy)
Office Secretary	Biplob Chakroborty
