= Chawkbazar Thana =

Chawkbazar Thana may refer to:

- Chawkbazar Thana, Chattogram, a thana under Chattogram Metropolitan Police
- Chawkbazar Thana, Dhaka, a thana under Dhaka Metropolitan Police
