= Gomostapur =

Village in Rajshahi Division, Bangladesh

Coordinates: 24°46′53″N 88°16′46″E

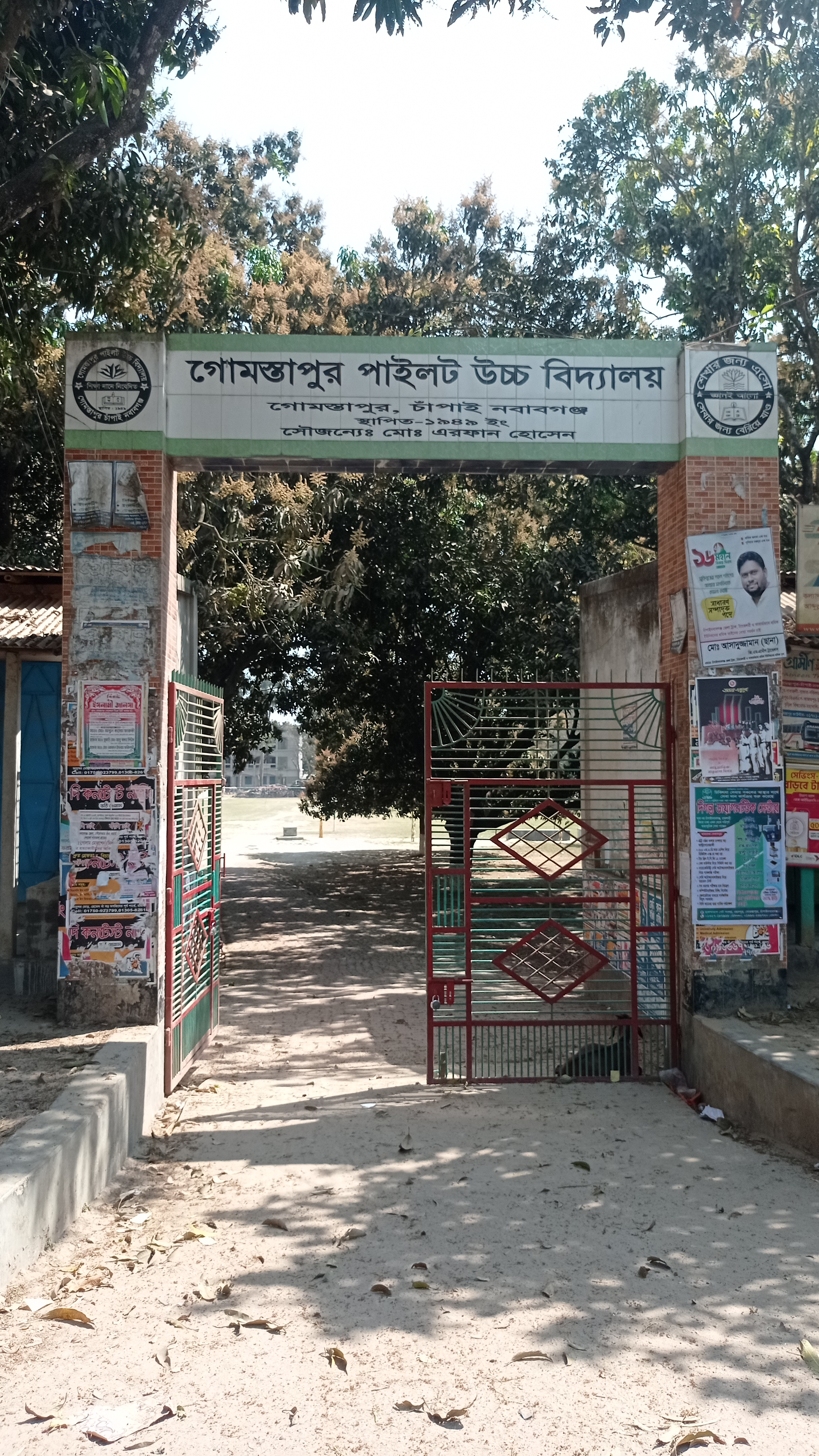
Gomostapur Pilot High School Campus

Gomostapur or Gomastapur is a village in Bangladesh located in Gomostapur Upazila in the northwestern district of Chapai Nawabganj.

== Demographics ==
According to the 2011 Bangladesh census, the village had 2,675 households and a population of 12,203.

== Economy ==
The majority of the population derives its living from agriculture and the service sector. Gomostapur does not have any significant manufacturing or mechanized industries.

== Points of interest ==
The village is located only about 15 miles away from the medieval capital of Bengal, Gaur. Although the city center of Gaur lies in India, many medieval ruins are located in Bangladesh not far from Gomostapur. In addition, Gomostapur is located about 15 miles south of the medieval Grand Trunk Road, which was an ancient major highway renovated by Sher Shah Suri in the 16th century. During his rule, the road spanned thousands of miles and connected the Bangladeshi port city of Chittagong to Kabul.

== Education ==
There are a number of educational facilities around Gomostapur, these include:

- Sulaiman Ali Mia College (Grades 10–12)
- Gomostapur Pilot High School (Grades 6–10)
- Abdul Hamid Girls High School (Grades 6–10)
- Nayadiary Yakub Ali High School (Grades 6–10)
- Gomostapur Primary School (Grades 1–5)
- Balugram Primary School (Grades 1–5)
- Nayadiari Primary School (Grades 1–5)
- Balugram Madrasha (Grades 1–5)

== See also ==
- List of villages in Bangladesh
